= George Floyd protests in Minneapolis–Saint Paul =

Reaction to death of an unarmed black man

- Part of George Floyd protests
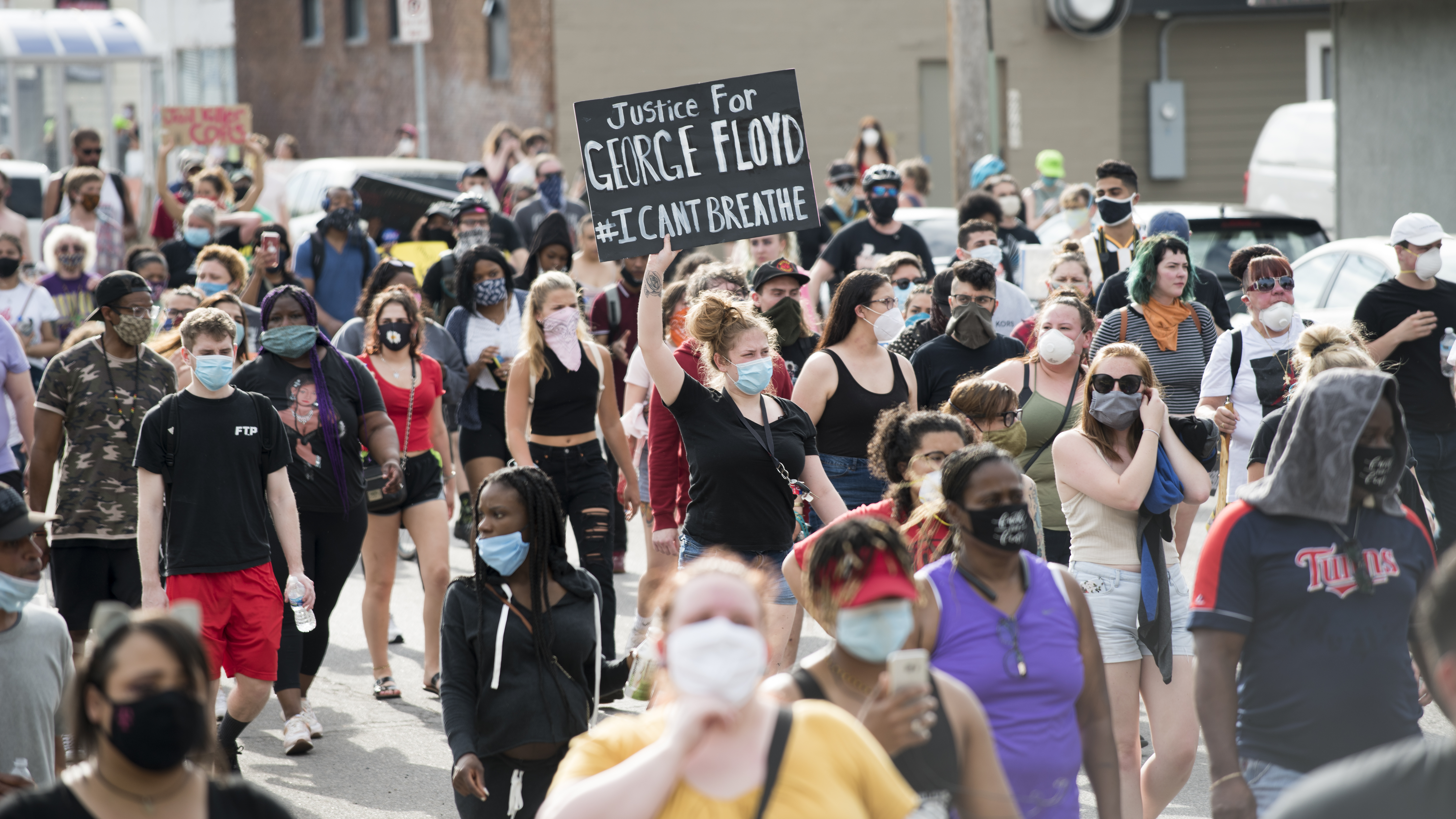
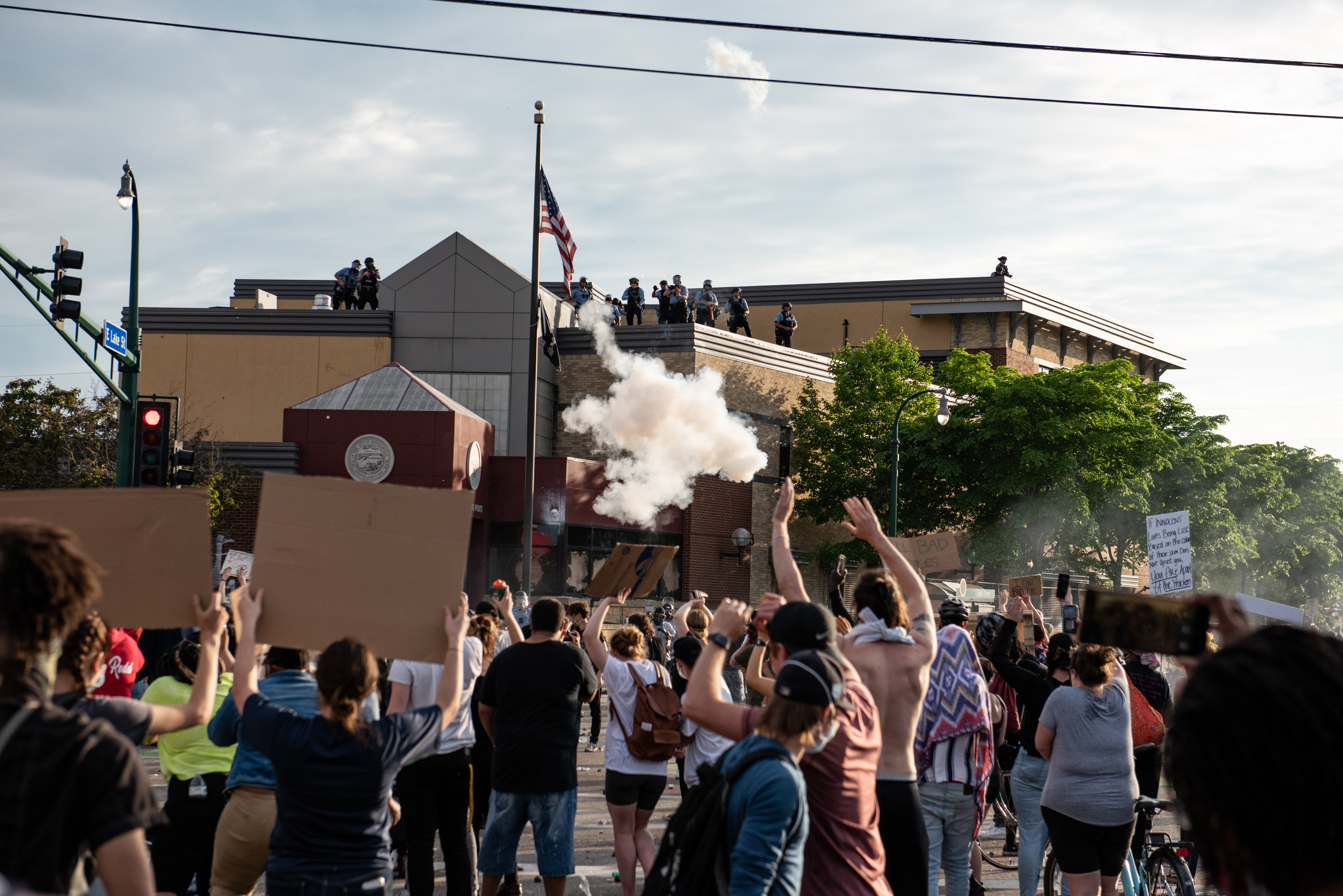
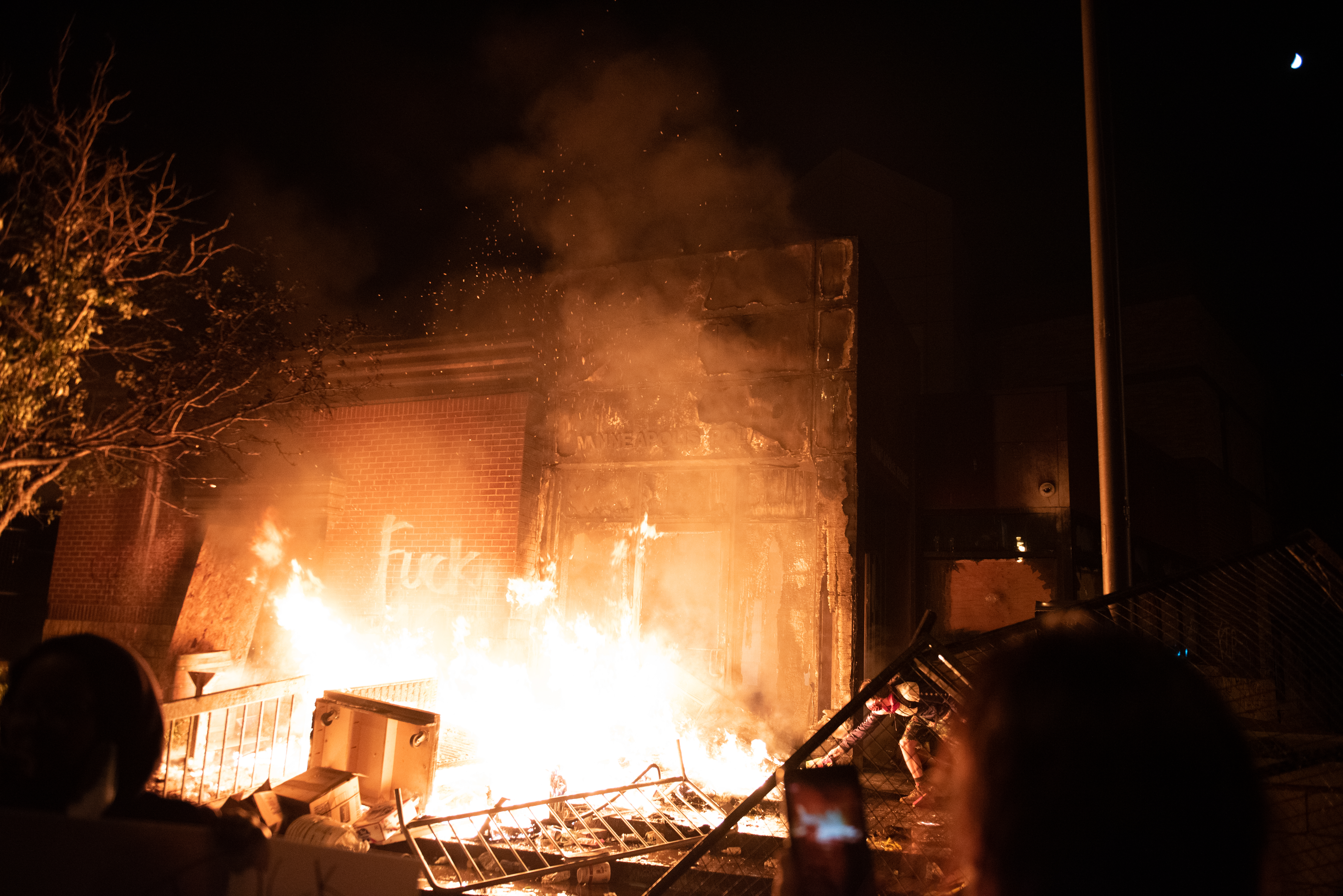
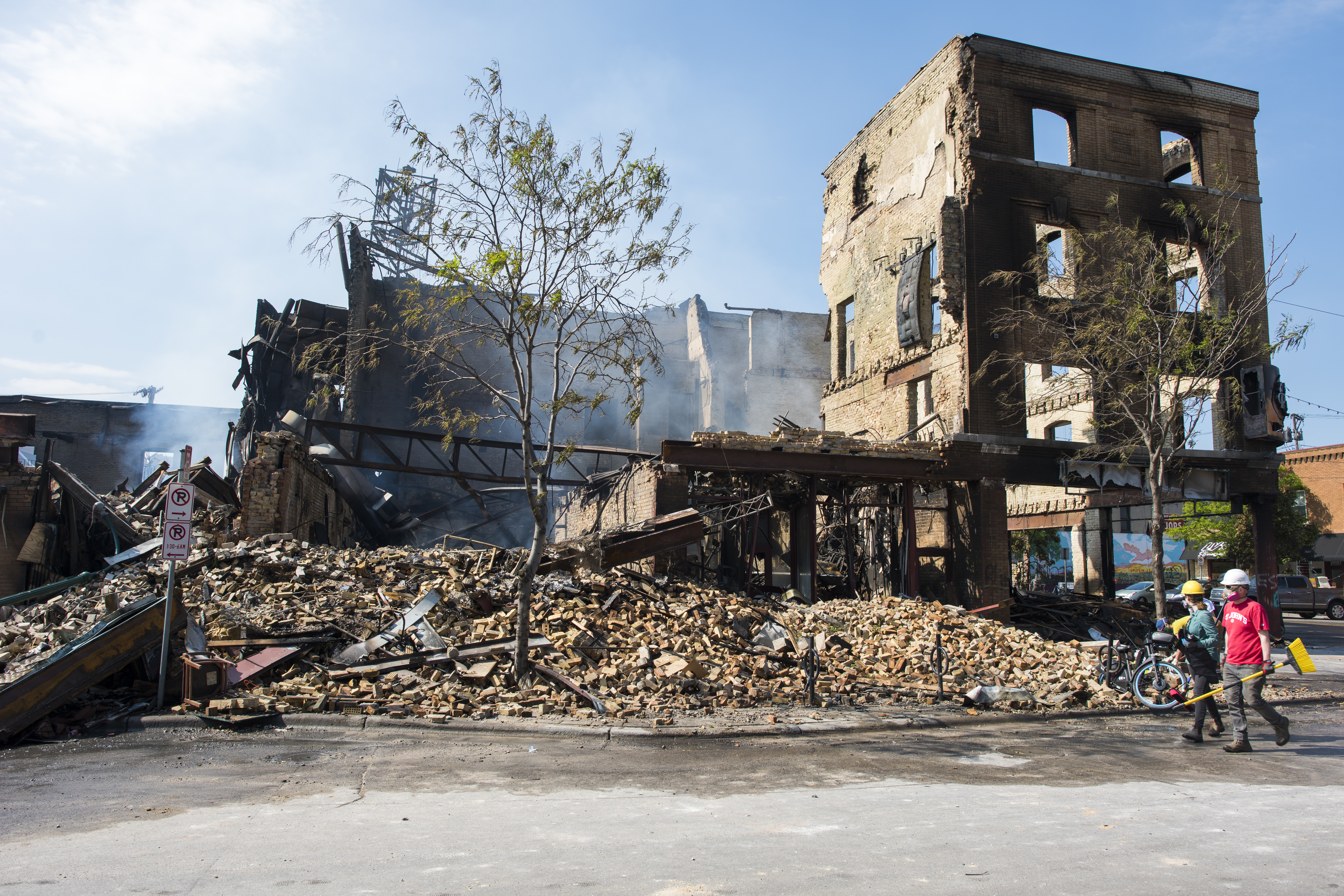
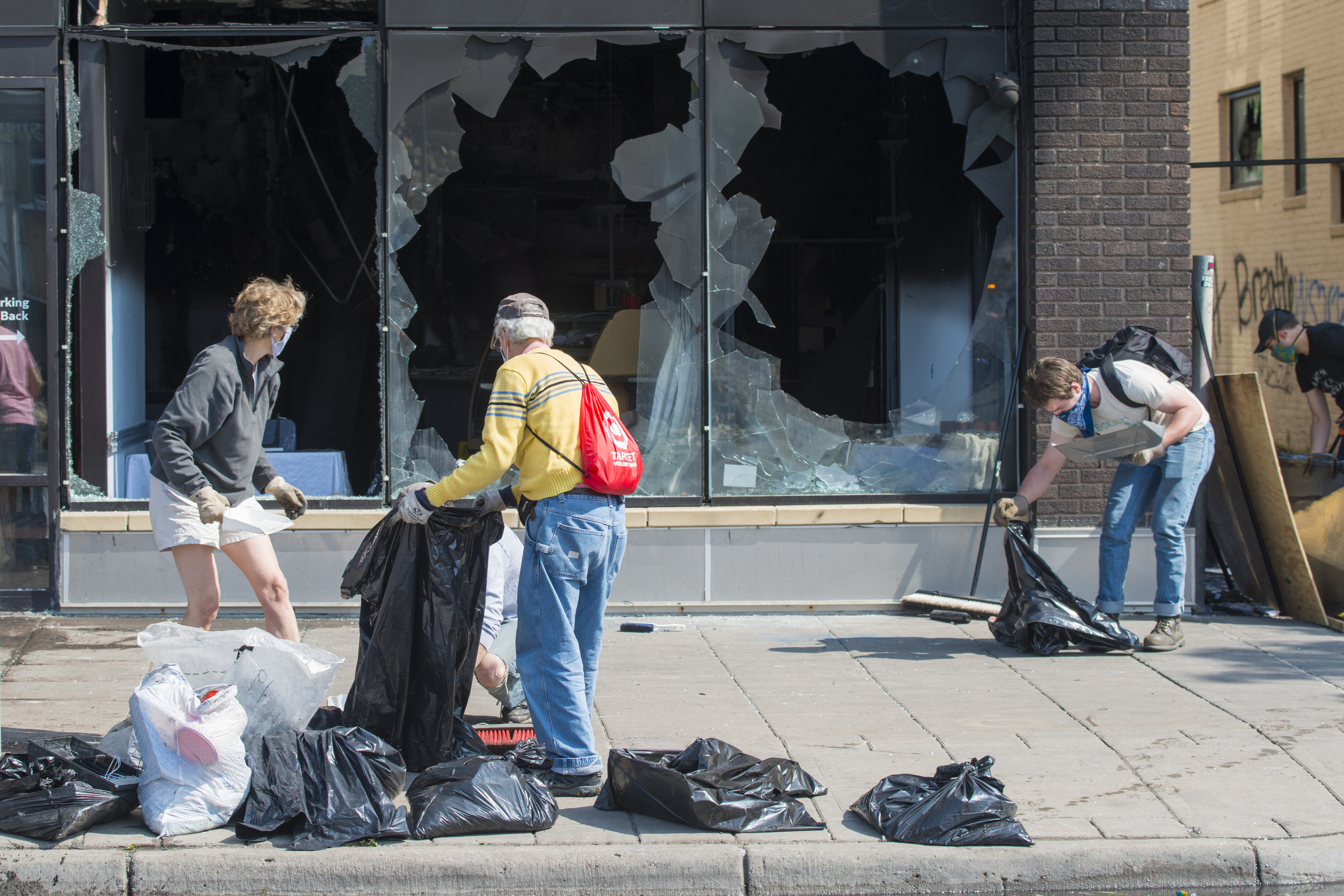
- Clockwise from top: Protesters march in Minneapolis on May 26, 2020; Police station set ablaze; Volunteers clean up; Ruins on East Lake Street; Tear gas fired on protesters
- Date: Initial events: May 26 – June 7, 2020 (12 days); Subsequent events: June 8, 2020 – May 2, 2023 (2 years, 10 months and 4 weeks)
- Location: Minneapolis–Saint Paul metropolitan area in the U.S. state of Minnesota
- Caused by: Reaction to the murder of George Floyd; Economic, racial and social inequality
- Goals: Murder charges for all officers involved; End to police brutality; Defund the police; Resignation of Bob Kroll; Recall Michael O. Freeman
- Methods: Mass demonstrations, civil disobedience, civil resistance, riots, arson, public art
- Result: Initial government mobilization to the unrest ended on June 7, 2020; Prolonged racial unrest in 2020–2023

Aftermath
- Deaths: Calvin Horton Jr.; Oscar Lee Stewart Jr.
- Arrested: 604 from May 27—June 2, 2020
- Damage: As reported by June 19, 2020: $500 million 1,500 property locations 164 structure fires from arson
- Charged: Federal: 17 for arson; 1 for felony gun possession; State and local: 91 for felony burglary; 1 for attempted murder of police officers (acquitted at trial); 1 for criminal vehicular operation (charges dropped); 1 police officer for assault

Local protests over the murder of George Floyd, sometimes called the Minneapolis riots or the Minneapolis uprising, began on May 26, 2020, and within a few days had inspired a global protest movement against police brutality and racial inequality. The initial events were a reaction to a video filmed the day before and circulated widely in the media of police officer Derek Chauvin kneeling on Floyd's neck for several minutes while Floyd struggled to breathe, begged for help, lost consciousness, and died. Public outrage over the content of the video gave way to widespread civil disorder in Minneapolis, Saint Paul, and other cities in the Minneapolis–Saint Paul metropolitan area over the five-day period of May 26 to 30 after Floyd's murder.

Minneapolis sustained extensive damage from rioting and looting during the protests—largely concentrated on a 5-mile (8.0 km) stretch of Lake Street south of downtown—including the destruction of the city's 3rd police precinct building, which was overrun by demonstrators and set on fire. At a cost of $350 million, approximately 1,300 properties in Minneapolis were damaged by the civil unrest, of which nearly 100 were completely destroyed. Saint Paul suffered damages that totaled $82 million and affected 330 buildings, including 37 properties that were heavily damaged or destroyed, with most destruction along the University Avenue business corridor. The Bureau of Alcohol, Tobacco, Firearms and Explosives tracked 164 structure fires due to arson in the Twin Cities region during the riots.

Governor Tim Walz activated the Minnesota National Guard in response to civil unrest. The 7,123 troops activated represented the largest deployment of the state's forces since World War II. By early June 2020, violence in the Minneapolis–Saint Paul metropolitan area had resulted in at least two deaths, 604 arrests, and more than $500 million in damage to approximately 1,500 properties, the second-most destructive period of local unrest in U.S. history, after the 1992 Los Angeles riots. Violent protests in Minneapolis–Saint Paul over Floyd's murder largely subsided after May 30, 2020. The Minnesota National Guard and a multi-jurisdiction government command that responded to the riots demobilized on June 7, 2020.

Local protests and unrest over Floyd's murder continued in 2020–2023 and broadened to other issues of racial injustice. On May 2, 2023, the conclusion of the last criminal case for the four Minneapolis police officers responsible for murdering Floyd fulfilled a key demand of protesters that Derek Chauvin, J. Alexander Kueng, Thomas Lane, and Tou Thao all be held legally accountable.

== Background ==
=== Murder of George Floyd ===
George Floyd was an unarmed African-American man who died while he was being detained by Minneapolis police on May 25, 2020, shortly after 8:00 p.m. CDT, near the Cup Foods grocery store at the intersection of East 38th Street and Chicago Avenue. Minneapolis police officer Derek Chauvin knelt on Floyd's neck for nine minutes and twenty-nine seconds, while three other officers, J. Alexander Kueng, Thomas Lane, and Tou Thao, assisted Chauvin with Floyd's arrest and held concerned onlookers back. Floyd could be heard repeatedly on a bystander's video saying his final words: "I can't breathe", "Please", and "Mama". He appeared unconscious at the scene, and was pronounced dead at 9:25 p.m. after being transported by ambulance to the Hennepin County Medical Center emergency room.

=== Racial disparities in Minnesota ===
By the beginning of the 21st century, Minneapolis was home to some of the largest racial disparities in the United States. The city's population of people of color and Indigenous people fared worse than the city's white population by many measures of well-being, such as health outcomes, academic achievement, income, and home ownership. The result of discriminatory policies and racism over the course of the city's history, racial disparity was described by author Tom Webber in Minneapolis: An Urban Biography as the most significant issue facing Minneapolis in the first decades of the 2000s.

By 2015, homeownership rates in the Twin Cities were 75 percent for white families, but only 23 percent for black families, one of the largest disparities in the nation. By 2018, unemployment for black people in Minnesota had reached a historic low of 6.9 percent, but it was still three times higher than the rate for white people. Though black residents made up just 6 percent of Minnesota's population, they were nearly 37 percent of the state's prison population in 2016. By the 2020s, generations of the city's black residents had been unable to experience the same levels of comforts and asset accumulation as the white residents.

The Atlantic said that years of disinvestment and abandonment of the area around Lake Street in Minneapolis and city officials ignoring the needs of the community's black residents were some of the conditions that led to civil disorder in Minneapolis.

=== Prior killings by law enforcement ===
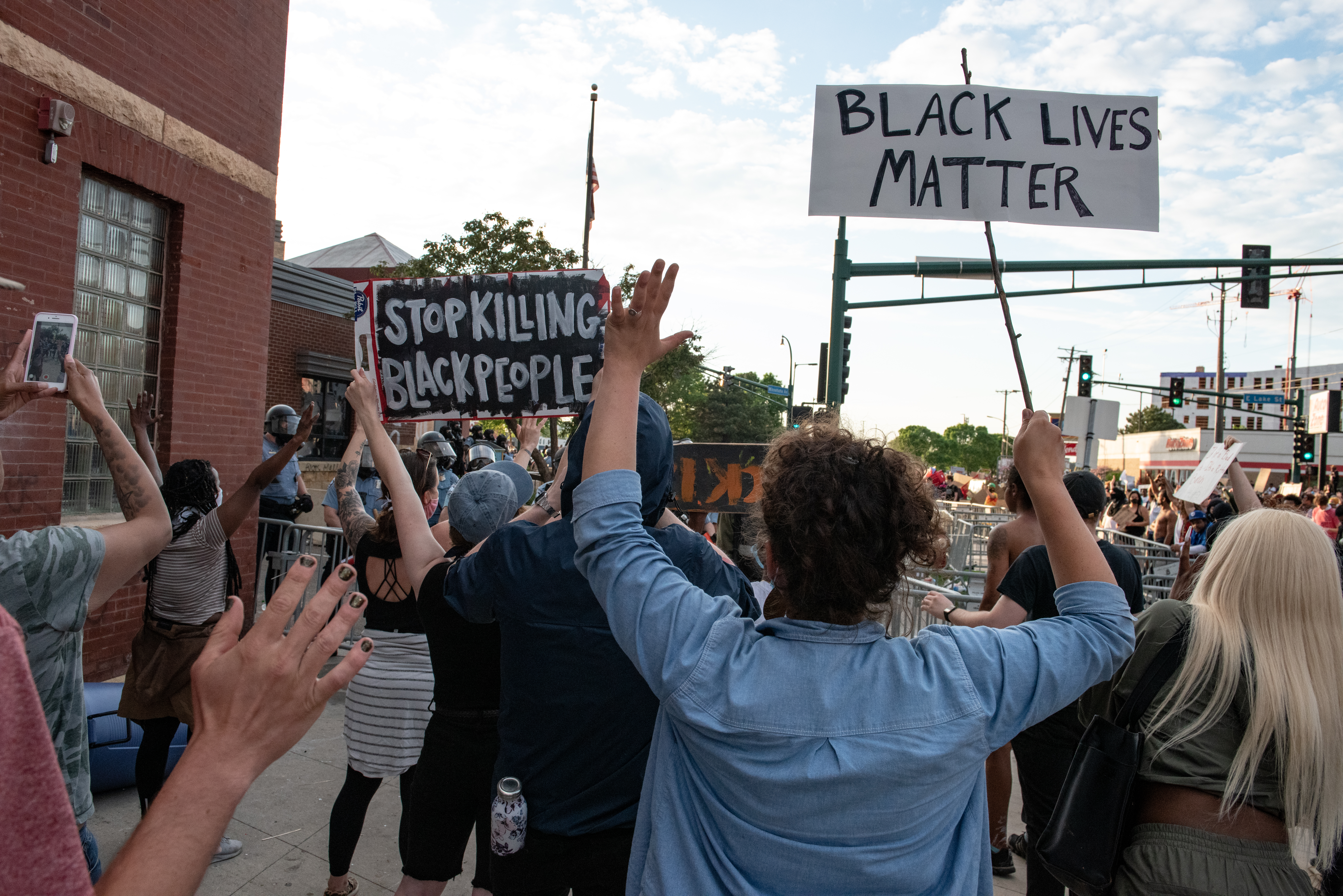
"Black Lives Matter" and "Stop Killing Black People" signs at a Minneapolis protest, May 27, 2020

George Floyd's murder was viewed by some residents as a continuation of a history of police violence in Minneapolis, where 11 people were killed by police officers between 2010 and 2020, including Floyd. In 2015, the killing of Jamar Clark, a black man, by a Minneapolis police officer led to controversy and protests; it was later determined by prosecutors that the officers had acted in self defense and no charges were filed. In 2016, the killing of Philando Castile, a black man, in nearby Falcon Heights resulted in several weeks of protests and unrest; the resulting criminal case ended with a jury acquittal for the involved officer after a 10-month process. In 2017, the killing of Justine Damond, a white woman, led to a 12-year prison sentence for the police officer, a black man, who shot her.

In instances where Minneapolis police officers attempted to justify the aggressive use of force against residents, a pattern emerged in which the police department would release officer statements that were later contradicted by video and other evidence, as revealed by several civil rights and wrongful death lawsuits. Some felt that the judicial system was inconsistent in that it did not hold white police officers who killed black men accountable for their actions; the video of Floyd begging for relief while being pinned by Chauvin generated further concern and anger from both white and black residents in the city. Floyd's murder was also the third in a string of widely reported and highly publicized incidents in which unarmed black Americans were killed in 2020, including Ahmaud Arbery in Glynn County, Georgia on February 23 and Breonna Taylor in Louisville on March 13.

=== Distrust of Minneapolis police ===
By 2020, the relationship between the Minneapolis Police Department and the community, particularly the city's black residents, had deteriorated significantly. Several killings of residents by police officers and alleged displays of racial insensitivity by police leaders contributed to the tension. In the city's Powderhorn Park neighborhood, where Floyd was murdered, some argued there had been a persisting distrust between the police and black community.

The head of the police union representing Minneapolis officers, Bob Kroll, was a continuing source of controversy, having called Black Lives Matter a "terrorist organization" in 2016 after the officers involved in Clark's death were cleared of wrongdoing. His appearance at a political rally for Donald Trump's presidential campaign in 2019 generated controversy when Kroll said that Trump would "let cops do their job, put the handcuffs on the criminals instead of [on] us". Controversy had also erupted when police officers put up a "ghetto" Christmas tree at the fourth police precinct station in 2018.

The police department had a history of not holding officers accountable for complaints and disciplinary actions. Of the 80 officers fired for misconduct in the 20 years prior to the murder of Floyd, around half were reinstated. As a police officer with the department, Chauvin had received 17 complaints, but only faced discipline once.

== Initial events ==
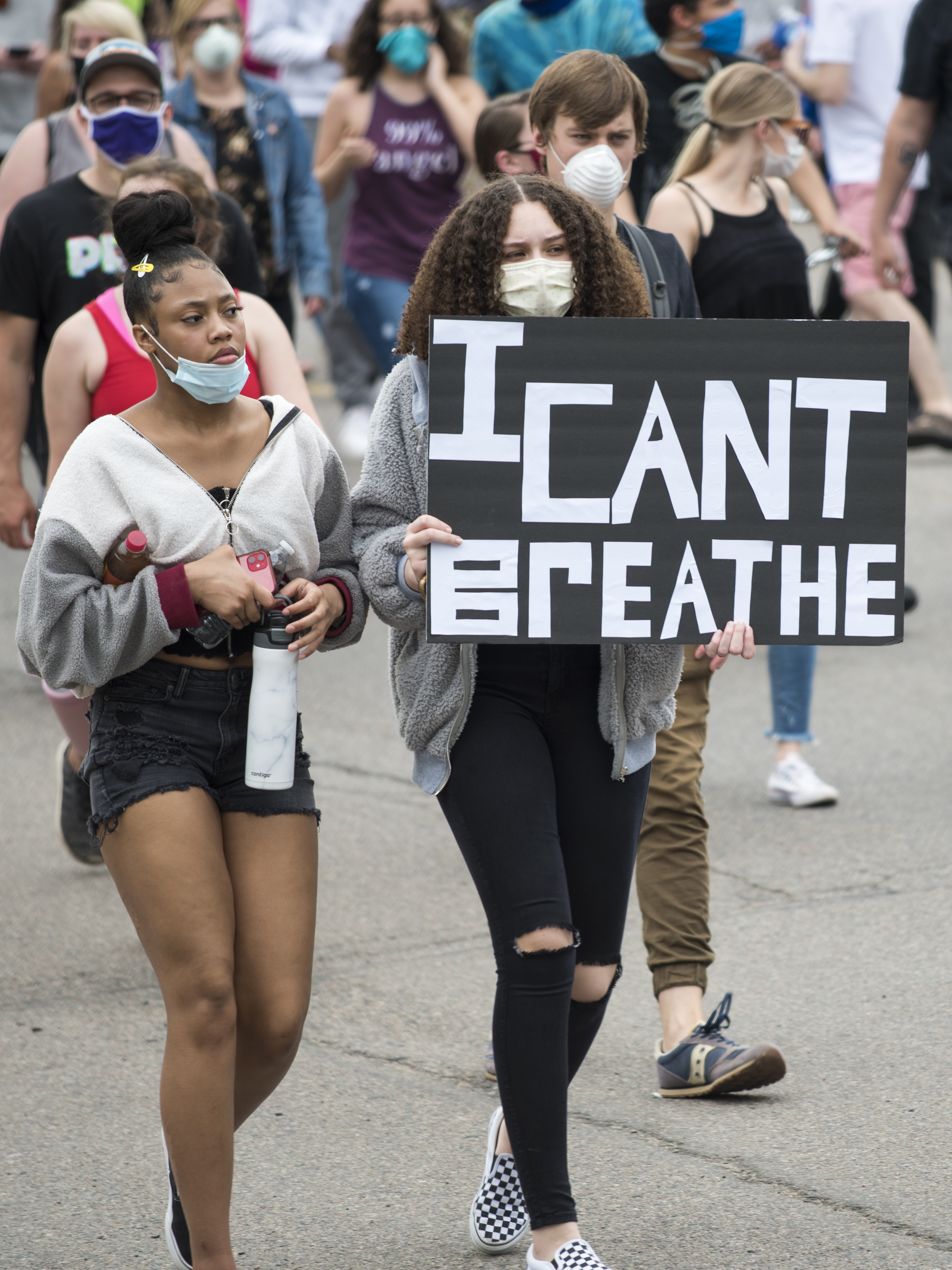
A protester in Minneapolis carries an "I can't breathe" sign, May 26, 2020

=== Tuesday, May 26, 2020 ===
==== Initial reactions to Floyd's murder ====
At 12:41 a.m. on May 26, Minneapolis police released a statement about the arrest and murder of Floyd several hours earlier. They said that a suspected money forger had "physically resisted" arrest and suffered "medical distress" after being handcuffed by officers, leading to his death. The statement made no mention that Floyd was unarmed or that Chauvin had kneeled on his neck for over nine minutes. At about the same time the police released their initial statement, Darnella Frazier, a bystander at the scene of Floyd's murder, uploaded a 10-minute video of the incident to Facebook and Instagram. The graphic video captured Floyd—while laying face down, handcuffed, and pinned by Chauvin's knee—saying he could not breathe and begging for his life as he lost consciousness. The video quickly went viral.

Official reaction came early in the morning. By 3:11 a.m. the police department said that the Federal Bureau of Investigation (FBI) would join local officials in the investigation of the incident. Minneapolis mayor Jacob Frey held a 6:45 a.m. press conference and said of the bystander video he had seen: "What we saw was horrible. Completely and utterly messed up." By mid-morning several public officials released statements condemning what they saw in the bystander's video. Saint Paul Mayor Melvin Carter said it was "vile and heartbreaking" and all the officers present at the scene of Floyd's arrest should be held accountable. U.S. senator Amy Klobuchar called for an independent investigation. Minnesota governor Tim Walz said, "We will get answers and seek justice." The four officers at the scene of Floyd's murder were placed on paid administrative leave, a standard protocol, pending further investigation.

The Minneapolis police department's initial statement, which mis-characterized the circumstances of Floyd's death, was perceived as being radically different from what was recorded on bystander videos, and fueled public outrage.

==== Organized protests emerge ====
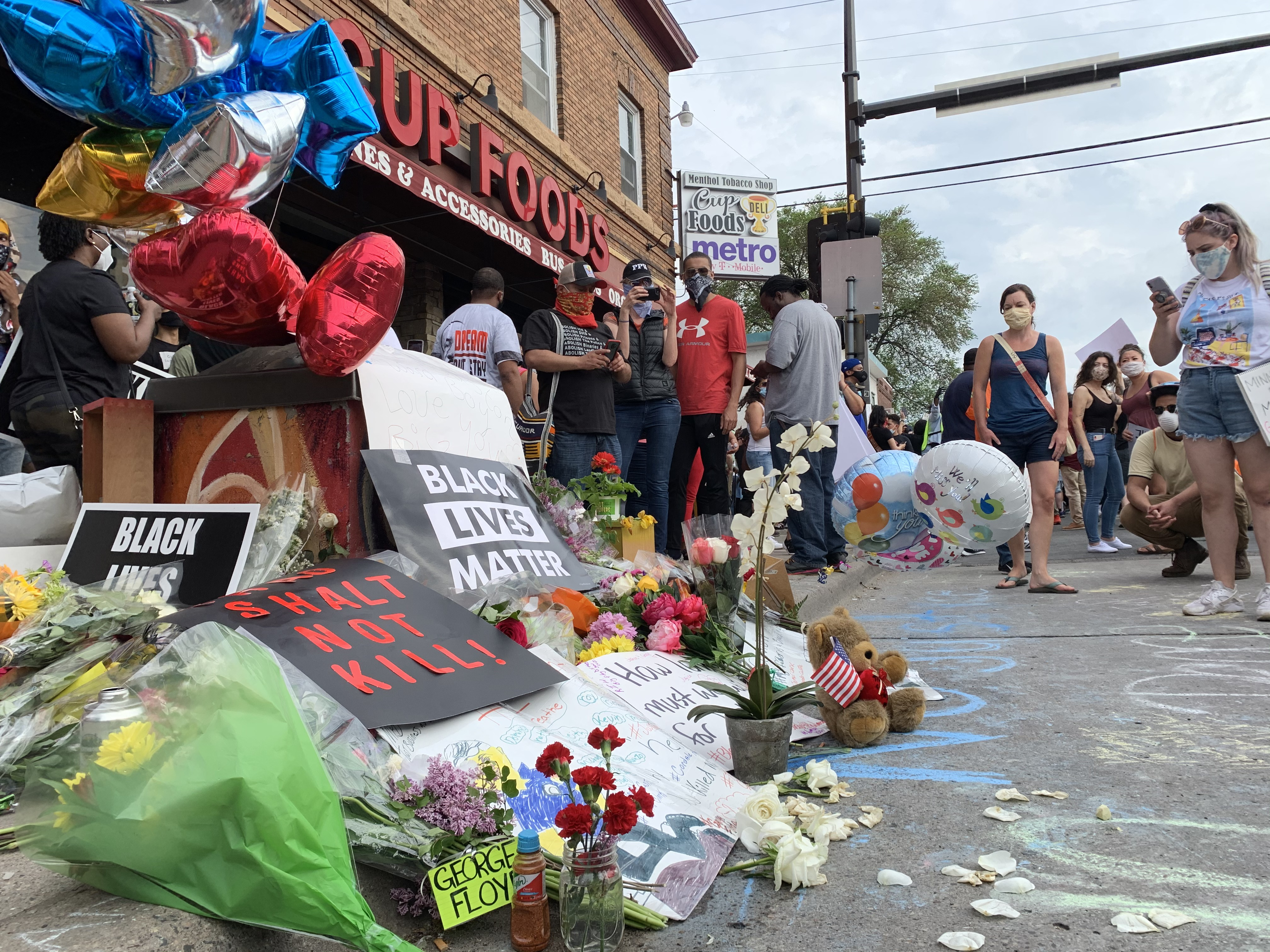
A memorial at the site of George Floyd's murder, May 26, 2020

By late morning on May 26, a makeshift memorial had been set up in Minneapolis outside the Cup Food store at East 38th Street and Chicago Avenue, the street intersection where Floyd was killed the previous day. The first organized protests emerged at the same location by midday. Some of the gathered protesters chanted, "I can't breathe", words repeated multiple times by Floyd in the viral video. Many people carried homemade signs that read, "Black Lives Matter," "Stop Killing Black People," and "I Can't Breathe." By the afternoon, as more details about the May 25 incident between Floyd and the police were known, thousands more rallied at the street intersection, and organizers emphasized keeping the gathering peaceful. Police estimated the size of the crowd at approximately 8,000 people.

==== Police officers fired ====
Frey and Minneapolis Police chief Medaria Arradondo held an afternoon press conference on May 26 to express solidarity with the community's growing sense of anger. Frey called for charges to be filed against the involved officers who killed Floyd, and said, "Whatever the investigation reveals, it does not change the simple truth that he should be with us this morning." Arradondo added, "Being Black in America should not be a death sentence."

In an unprecedented move in Minneapolis for swiftness, Arradondo fired the four officers who had been present at the scene of Floyd's arrest and murder, a move supported by Frey. Protesters and Floyd's family called for murder charges for all four officers involved and swift judicial consequences, as the Minnesota Bureau of Criminal Apprehension also opened an investigation of the incident. Bob Kroll, president of the Minneapolis police officer's union, said the firing of the officers occurred without due process and offered "full support of the officers" during the investigations. Hennepin County attorney Michael O. Freeman, the official responsible for bringing criminal charges against the police officers, promised an expedited review of the case.

==== Protests intensify into rioting ====
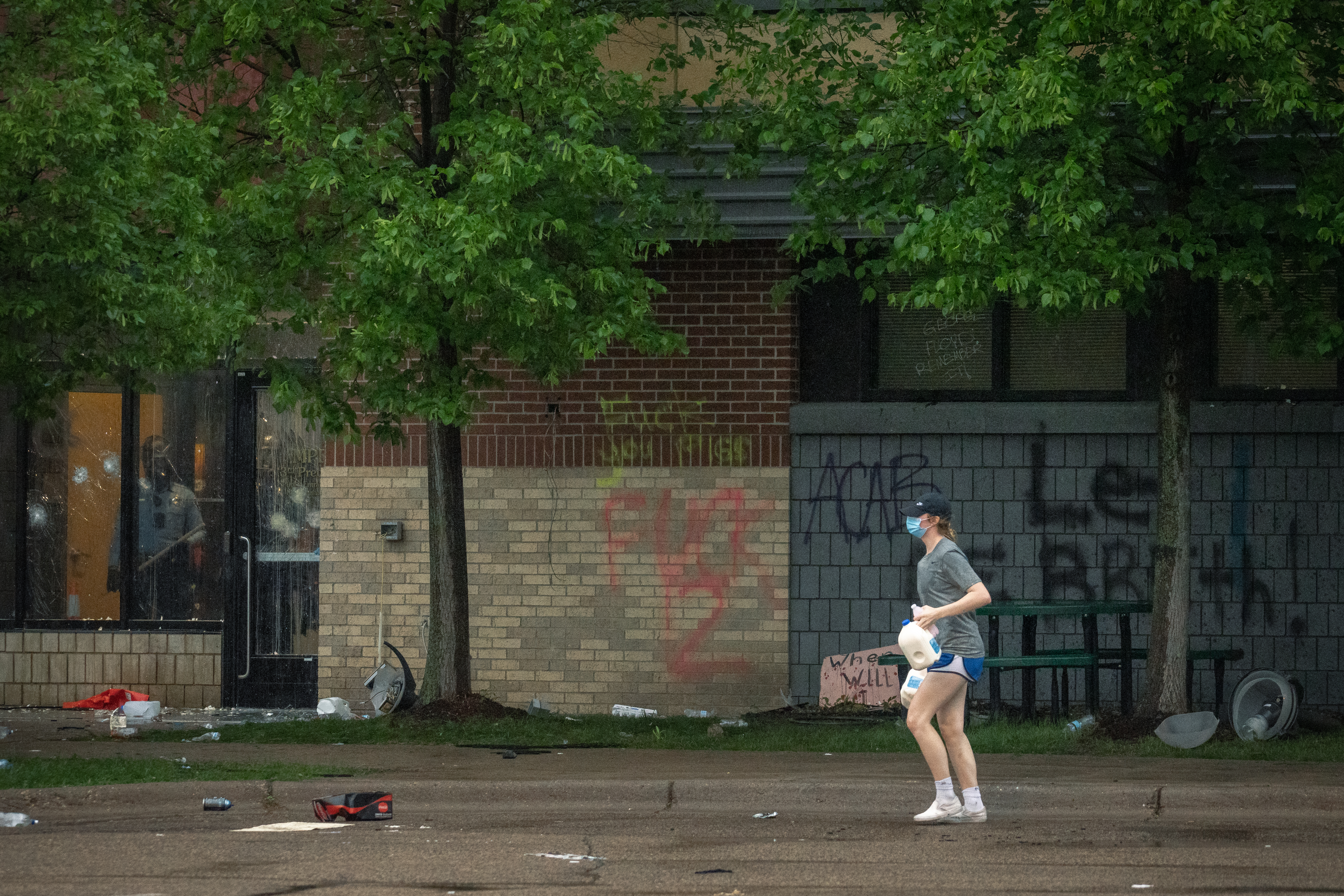
The vandalized Minneapolis third police precinct building the evening of May 26, 2020

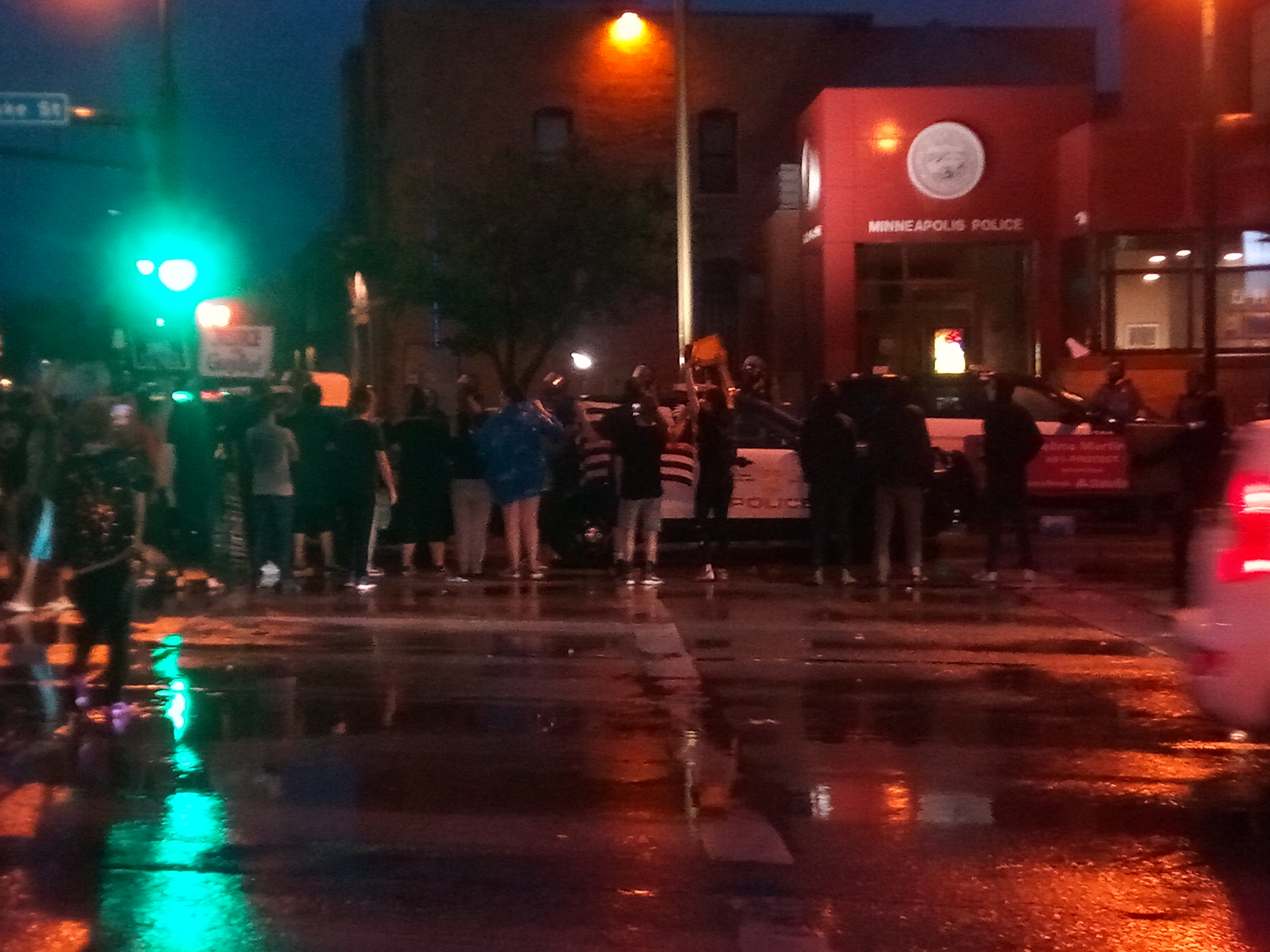
Protesters outside the Minneapolis third police precinct at night, May 26, 2020

The tone of protests, which were peaceful initially, shifted the afternoon of May 26. State officials began monitoring the events as protests began to escalate at East 38th Street and Chicago Avenue. By evening, the protest rally at the location of Floyd's murder became a two-mile (3.2 km), peaceful march to the Minneapolis Police Department's third precinct police station where the four involved officers worked. The Minnesota State Patrol began activating its Mobile Field Force, but it staged its officers in the nearby suburb of Richfield as the Minneapolis police declined assistance.

At the Minneapolis police third precinct station on Minnehaha Avenue, protesters rallied peacefully with megaphones and signs on the steps at the building's entrance. The main protest group disbanded later in the evening. A smaller group that broke away from the main protest breached the fence of the station parking lot, climbed on the building, painted graffiti, threw rocks and bottles at officers, broke a window of the building, and broke a window of an unoccupied police car. Some protesters tried to stop the vandalism, with a scuffle breaking out in the crowd.

Recently elected city council member Jeremiah Ellison, who had participated in prior protests against the police after the killing of black men, advised the mayor to not interfere with those vandalizing police property, hoping to spare the surrounding neighborhood from further damage. Police Chief Arradondo eventually ordered forces to respond, and police officers fired tear gas and rubber bullets to push demonstrators back, even though there were protesters who were not being violent. He later told reporters that he made the decision to fire upon the crowd because some officers kept weapons in their vehicles that could be taken. In response to being fired upon, demonstrators threw rocks, water bottles, and miscellaneous objects towards the officers. The unruly crowd clashing with the police numbered in the hundreds, a noted contrast from the larger, peaceful group gathered earlier in the day, who were estimated to number in the thousands. Many protesters viewed the police response to the vandalism as an overreaction that only made the crowd angrier.

Late at night on May 26, Minnesota State Patrol officers were deployed to the third precinct station building and to the home of Derek Chauvin in Oakdale, Minnesota, where another large crowd had gathered.

=== Wednesday, May 27, 2020 ===
==== Peaceful protests resume ====
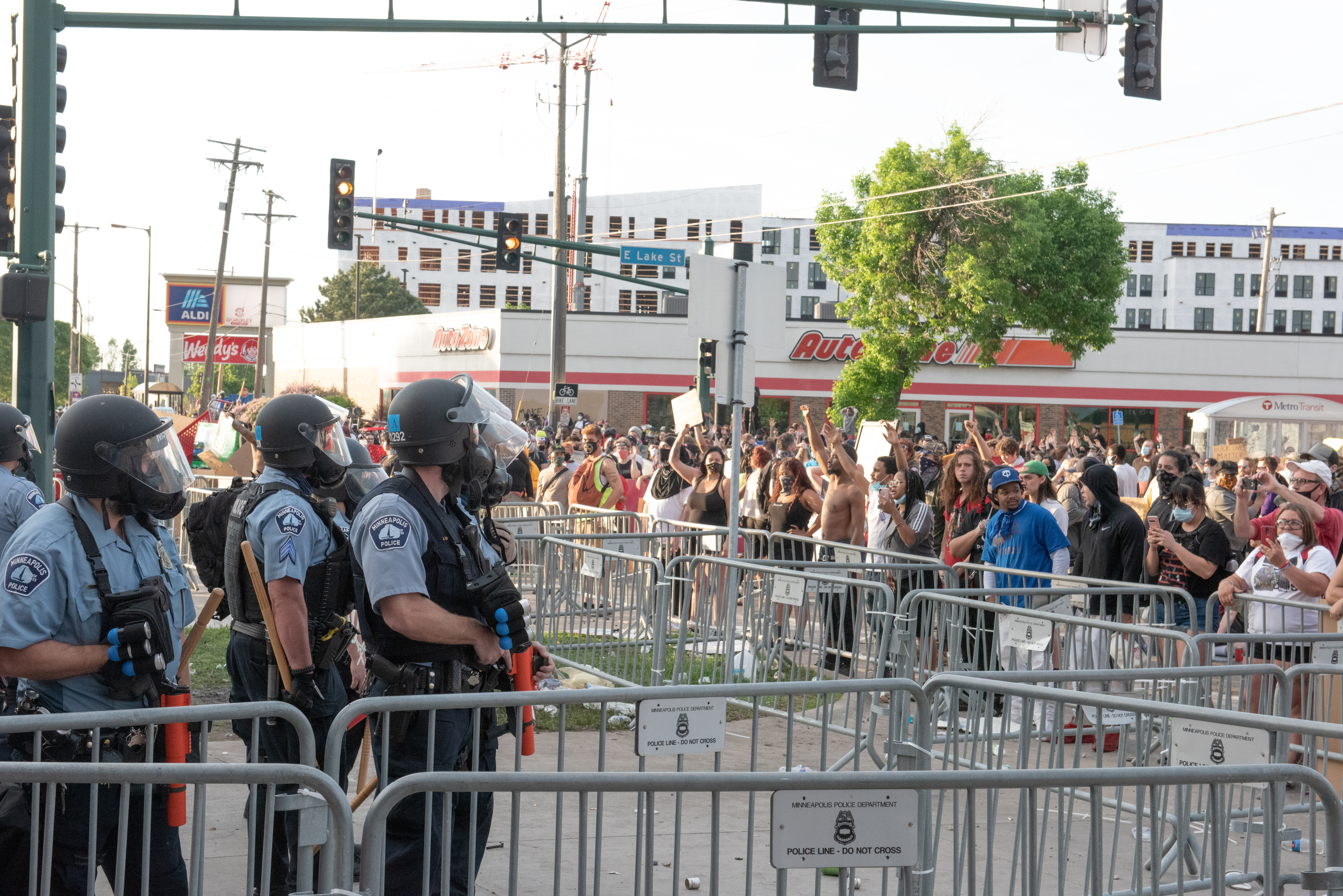
Police and protesters stand off outside the third precinct station in Minneapolis, May 27, 2020

Protests in Minneapolis resumed Wednesday, May 27 at several locations throughout the city. At the location of Floyd's murder, protesters were led through prayer and a series of chants. By late morning, a group of protesters blocked the nearby intersection. Some protesters left memorials by the Cup Foods store, while some spray painted the words "Justice for Floyd" and "Black Lives Matter" on the street surface. No police were present and the scene was described as peaceful. A protest occurred outside the Minneapolis home of Hennepin County attorney Michael O. Freeman. Throughout the day state and local officials discussed the possibility of deploying more state patrols and National Guard troops, but anticipated it would not be needed until Saturday, May 30 when larger protests were planned. However, state officials were unsure if Minneapolis city officials had a plan in place to deal with the civil unrest.

==== Looting and arson begin ====
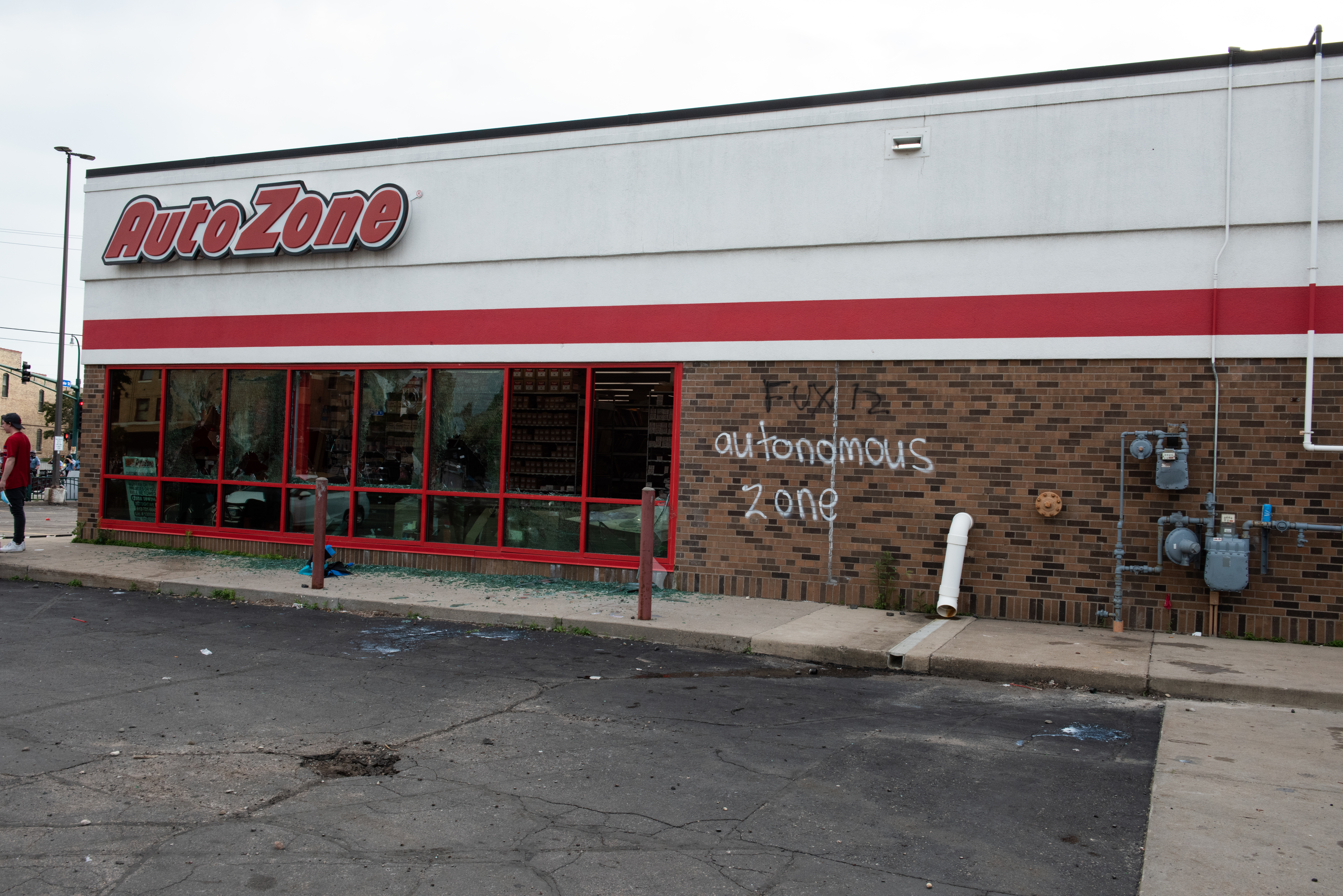
Broken windows of an AutoZone store on East Lake Street in Minneapolis, May 27, 2020

A crowd of about 1,000 people converged outside the Minneapolis third police precinct station at the intersection of East Lake Street and Minnehaha Avenue on May 27. By 6:15 p.m., skirmishes had broken out in the crowd as demonstrators had begun throwing objects at the police station and officers fired chemical irritants to push them back. By 6:25 p.m. police received reports of looting as another crowd of people began ransacking a Target store a short distance away from the protest. At 6:32 p.m., at an AutoZone store located across the intersection from the third police precinct station, a masked man carrying an umbrella and a sledgehammer was recorded on video breaking windows and spray-painting graffiti which encouraged looting. Some protesters confronted the masked man and asked him to stop. In a warrant filed after the riots to investigate the mysterious "Umbrella Man", police said he was a member of the Aryan Brotherhood, that the abrupt attack at AutoZone came during a mostly calm demonstration at the street intersection of the third police precinct station, and that the man intended to incite violence.

Looting soon spread to several other businesses near the main protest site. Later in the evening on May 27, the same AutoZone store became the first building to be set on fire during the unrest. Some protesters attempted to put out the AutoZone fire, while others celebrated and took selfies. Another fire was started inside a nearby Cub Foods grocery store. By 9:24 p.m., Minneapolis police had run out of chemical irritants and Minnesota State Patrol officers abandoned attempts to stop the looting.

==== Fatal shooting of Calvin Horton Jr. and other violence ====
Violence escalated at nightfall on May 27. At about 9:49 p.m., one mile (1.6 km) from the main protest site near the city's third police precinct building, Calvin Horton Jr., a 43-year-old man from Minneapolis, was fatally shot by the owner of the Cadillac Pawn & Jewelry shop who believed he was burglarizing his business. Including Horton, five people were struck by gunfire in Minneapolis that night, but he was the only reported fatality.

==== Local officials react and plan ====
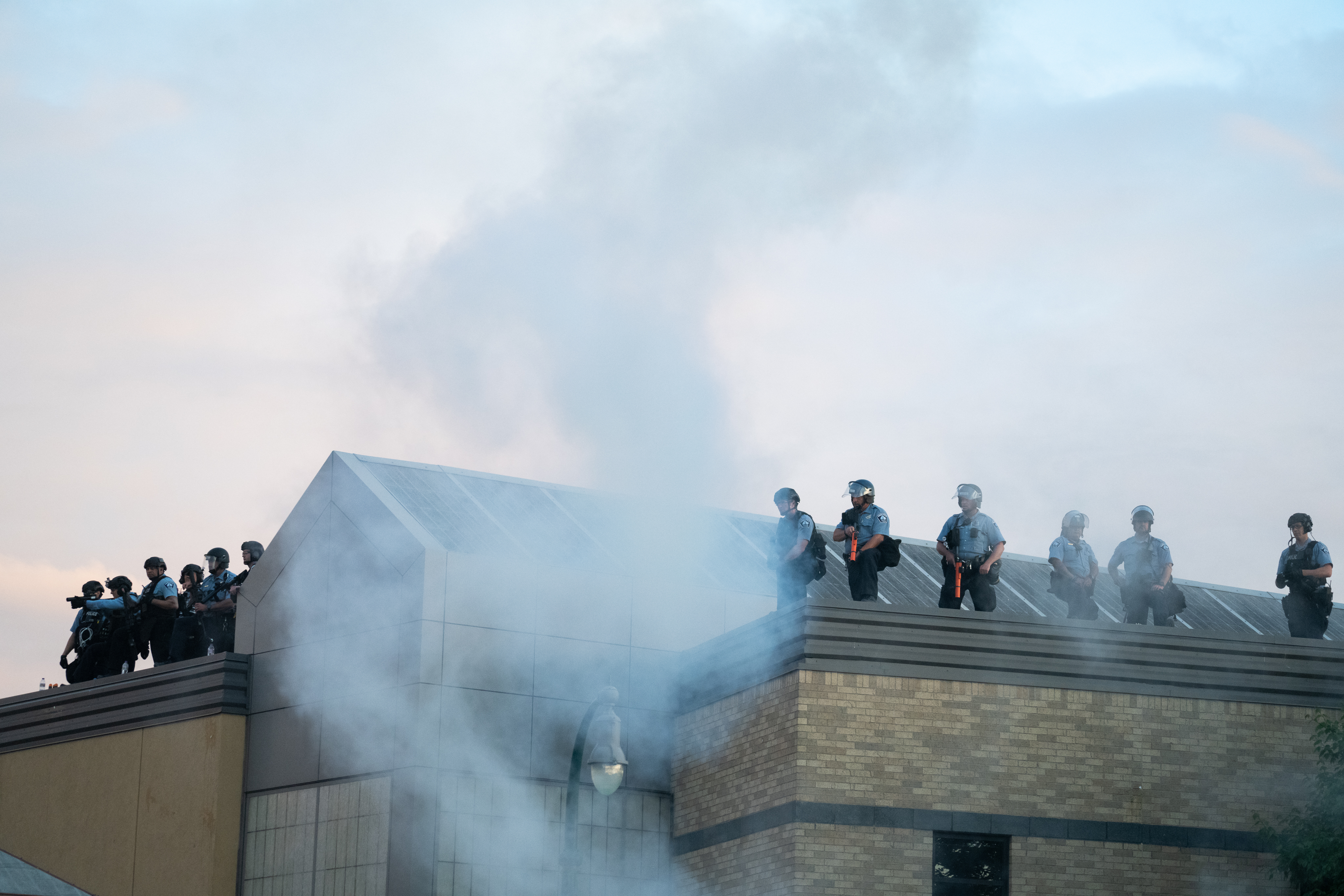
Minneapolis police officers firing tear gas from atop the third precinct station, May 27, 2020

Frey made an emotional plea just before midnight on May 27, saying, "Please, please, Minneapolis. We cannot let tragedy beget more tragedy. The activity around Lake and Hiawatha is now unsafe. Please, help us keep the peace. ..."

Frey also reached out to Minnesota governor Tim Walz that night and requested the help of the Minnesota National Guard, but the city government was reportedly unaware of the timeline and logistics of troop deployment, and delegated tactical coordination to the police force. However, knowing that it would take some time for the National Guard to mobilize, Frey and city leaders began discussing ways to deescalate the situation with demonstrators.

Minneapolis City Council member Andrew Johnson, who represented the area by the third police precinct station, blamed the police for the unfolding destruction, arguing they prioritized defense of the third precinct building over business premises.

Council member Jeremiah Ellison said in a media interview that night that the police should "sacrifice" the station, while council member Linea Palmisano expressed privately to a city official about Ellison's remarks that such a move would result in "ultimate chaos".

==== Destruction spreads overnight ====
Midtown Corner, an under-construction apartment complex, on fire in Minneapolis, May 27, 2020

Looting and property destruction were widespread in Minneapolis overnight from May 27 to May 28, with the heaviest destruction occurring in the vicinity of the third precinct police station near Minnehaha Avenue and East Lake Street. Looting, which first began at a Target store in the Minnehaha Center shopping district, spread to a nearby Cub Foods grocery store, and then to several liquor stores, pharmacies, and other businesses across the city. The fire at the AutoZone store that was damaged earlier in the evening led to a series of other acts of arson. Among the losses to fire was Midtown Corner, an under-construction, $30 million redevelopment project for 189 units of affordable housing, which was destroyed by fire. Across the street from the apartment building, the manufacturing facility for 7-Sigma, a local high-tech company, also suffered extensive fire damage and part of the factory building collapsed. The response from firefighters in the area was delayed as crews required police escorts for protection from rioters. The Minneapolis fire department responded to approximately 30 fires overnight.

Overnight in the suburban City of Brooklyn Center, looters broke into several stores at the Shingle Creek Crossing shopping center. At about 1:00 am on May 28, a local police contingent amassed in the area to scatter vehicles that were circling the area, and police officers made three arrests.

=== Thursday, May 28, 2020 ===
==== Government mobilization ====
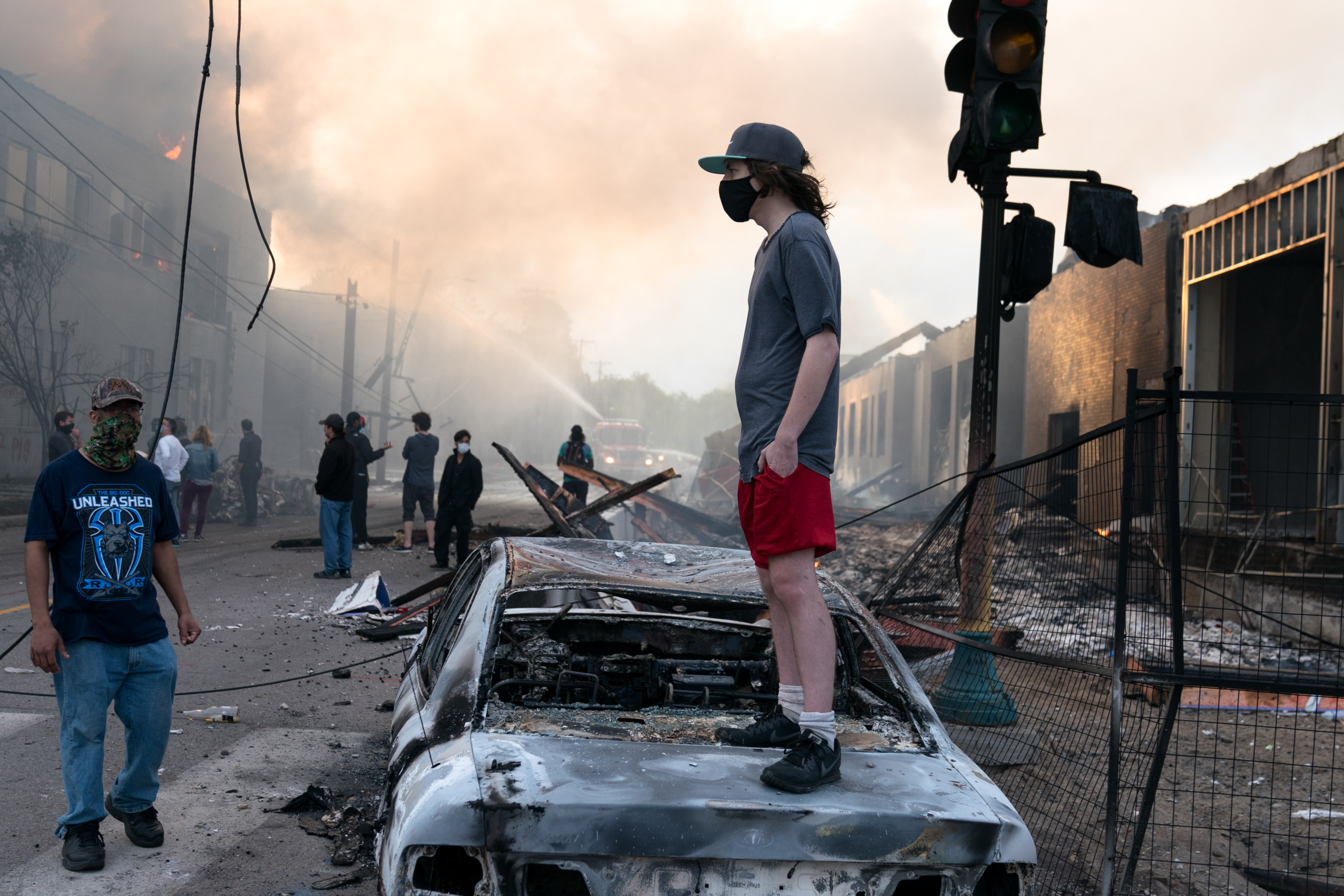
In Minneapolis the morning of May 28, 2020, residents observe overnight arson damage on East 29th Street as firefighters suppress fires.

At a press conference on May 28, Chief Arradondo remarked that, in his view, the majority of protests the previous day were peaceful, but were "hijacked" by some who were looting and vandalizing businesses. Minneapolis city officials hoped that the worst violence had already passed. Observing the events from near Washington, D.C., United States General Joseph L. Lengyel warned other high-ranking Pentagon officials that the situation in Minneapolis could escalate out of control and that the Minnesota National Guard and 200 military police officers should be ready and armed to intervene. Officials speculated that as many as 75,000 protesters could converge in the city by the weekend.

To quell riotous behavior, Mayor Frey declared a state of emergency to allow for more flexibility in the city's response. Frey and Arradondo also began quietly preparing for the contingency of surrendering the third precinct station in Minneapolis if violence escalated. Few people knew of the plan outside of some officers stationed there and nearby business owners who had heard rumors and noticed the station's parking lot being emptied of police squad cars and equipment.

Businesses throughout the Twin Cities spent the day boarding up windows and doors to prevent looting. Among them, the Target Corporation announced closures for all of its area stores. Saint Paul police officers armed with batons and gas masks patrolled the city's busiest commercial corridor and kept looters out of a Target store near University Avenue while other business windows were smashed. Minneapolis preemptively shut down its light-rail system and bus service through Sunday, May 31 out of safety concerns. Officials pleaded with metro area residents to stay home Thursday night to prevent further property destruction. African American Saint Paul mayor Melvin Carter said, "Please stay home. Please do not come here to protest. Please keep the focus on George Floyd, on advancing our movement and on preventing this from ever happening again."

At 4 p.m. CDT, Governor Walz formally activated 500 National Guard troops and deployed them to the Twin Cities area, at Frey's request. Walz commented, "George Floyd's death should lead to justice and systemic change, not more death and destruction." Lieutenant Governor Peggy Flanagan added, "the demonstration last night became incredibly unsafe for all involved. The purpose of the National Guard is to protect people, to protect people safely demonstrating, and to protect small business owners." Walz also said it would take guard troops a few days to fully mobilize.

==== Delay of officer criminal charges ====
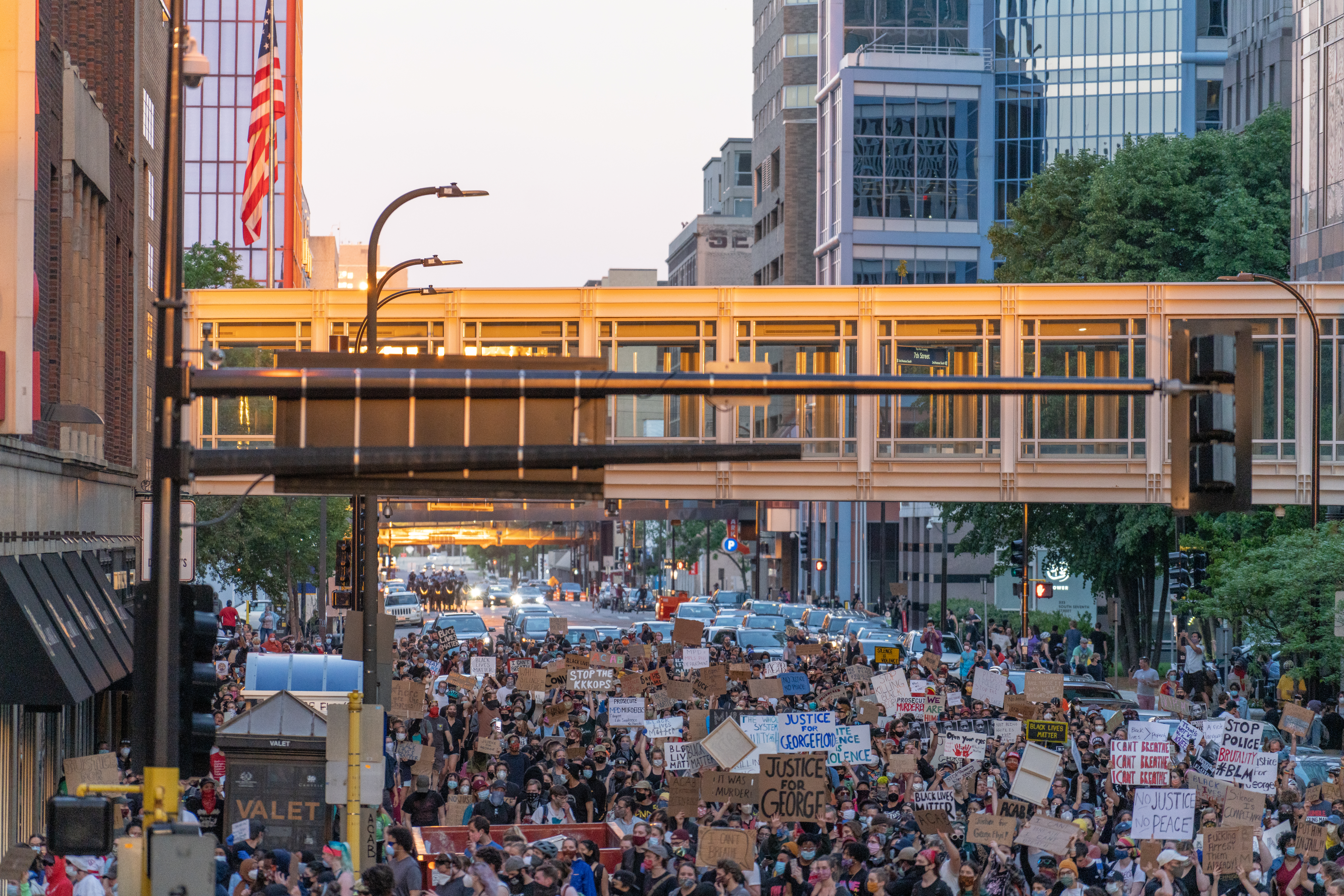
Protest march in downtown Minneapolis, May 28, 2020

State and federal prosecutors called a press conference in the late afternoon at a regional FBI office in Brooklyn Center, a Minneapolis suburb. It was anticipated that there they might reveal a major development in the case against the officers who were at the scene of Floyd's murder. After a long delay, however, Hennepin County attorney Michael O. Freeman announced that his office needed more time to investigate and that there was other evidence that might result in no criminal charges being filed. In responding to the anticipation created by the media briefing and its two-hour delayed start, U.S. attorney Erica MacDonald said, "I thought we would have another development to talk to you about, but we don't".

Weeks later, on June 9, 2020, it was revealed that state and federal prosecutors — on the afternoon of the delayed press conference — had been trying to negotiate a plea deal with former officer Derek Chauvin that would have included state murder charges and federal civil rights charges. It was later reported that Chauvin believed that the case against him was so devastating that he agreed to plead guilty to third-degree murder. As part of the deal, he was willing to go to prison for more than 10 years. The deal fell apart shortly before it was going to be announced after William Barr, the U.S. attorney general, rejected the arrangement fearing that it would be viewed as too lenient by protesters. The deal was contingent on the federal government's approval because Chauvin, who had asked to serve his time in a federal prison, wanted assurance he would not face federal civil rights charges. Details about the potential plea agreement were not publicly known during the initial period of unrest.

==== Transition from peaceful protests to destructive riots ====
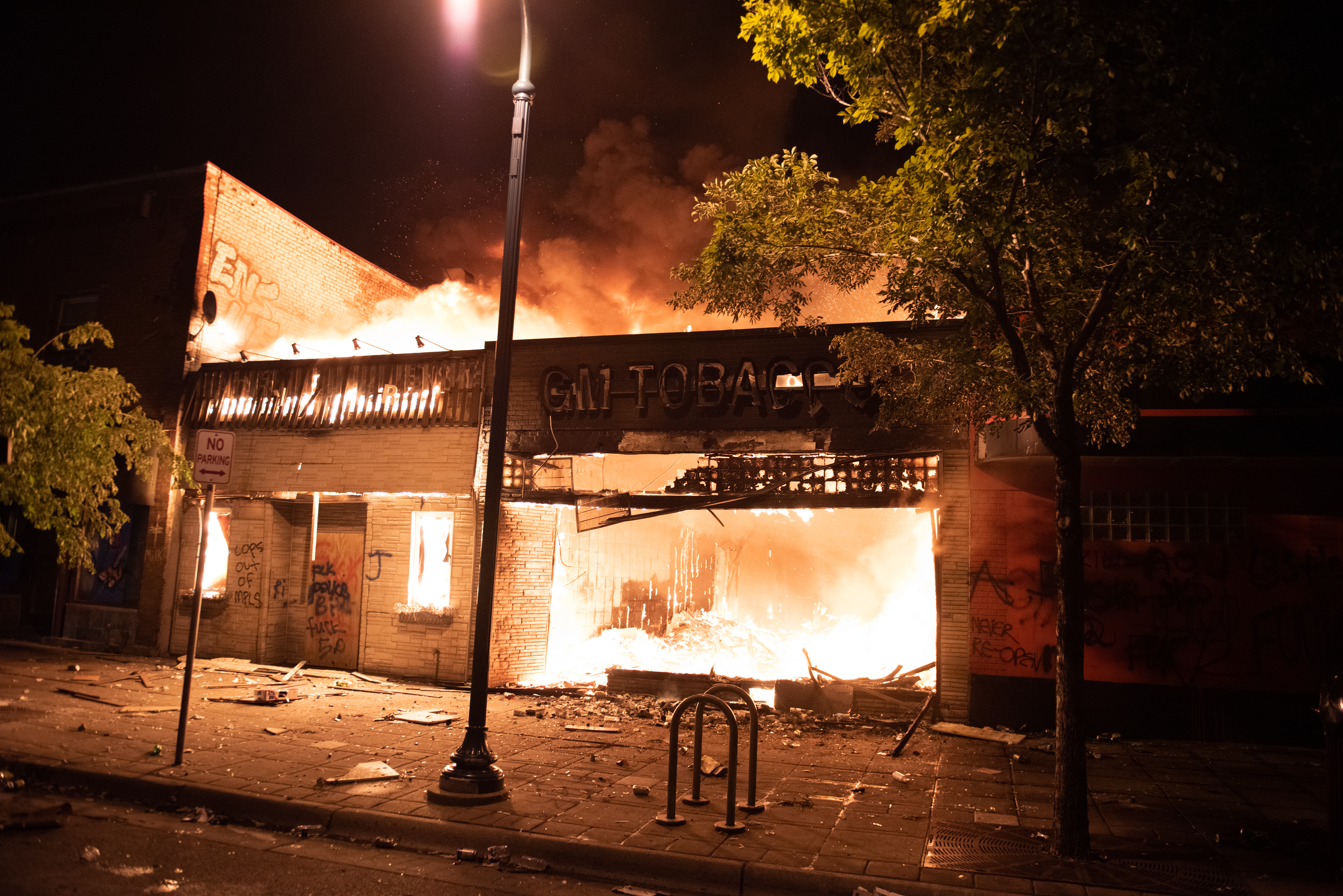
Several stores set ablaze on East Lake Street in Minneapolis, May 28, 2020

The number of protests overwhelmed the law enforcement response. Thousands of people marched peacefully in the streets of Minneapolis and called for justice for George Floyd during the day on May 28. Sporadic looting was reported in the afternoon in Saint Paul's Midway neighborhood. A crowd of about 1,000 people rallied in the early evening at the Hennepin County Government Center building in Minneapolis, and then marched through the city's downtown area where store fronts had been boarded up and the state patrol maintained a heavy presence; no violence was reported from the march.

Hundreds of demonstrators returned to the area near the third precinct police station, where Frey and Arradondo had reduced the street presence of the police. By the evening, police reports said the crowd was "engaged in peaceful activity" as some were cooking food, listening to music, and socializing. It was not until after sunset that the crowd grew more restless, when looting resumed and a vehicle and building were set on fire.

Multiple large, mobile crowds and chaos were reported across the city by nightfall. A crowd of 1,500 protesters were marching through a downtown shopping district in Minneapolis where there were 400 state troopers present. The tension escalated when another large crowd advanced on the city's first police precinct station near Hennepin Avenue and 5th Street. A Minneapolis police officer that drove near the crowd rolled down her window and indiscriminately fired Mace at protesters, bystanders, and journalists; the incident was caught on a viral video. Later, demonstrators downtown shot off fireworks and stood off against a line of Minneapolis police officers who fired tear gas.

Protesters marched on the Interstate 35W highway. Smaller crowds gathered elsewhere. "We were defending an entire city with 600 officers against thousands and thousands of protesters," Frey later said of the events.

==== Boogaloo adherents converge in Minneapolis ====
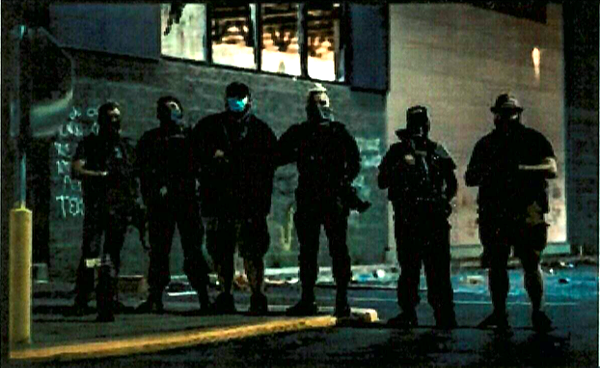
FBI photo of Boogaloo adherents in Minneapolis, May 28, 2020

As the riots unfolded, adherents of the Boogaloo movement, a far-right extremist movement, began discussions online about how to exploit the events to start a second American Civil War that would be blamed on Black Lives Matter. Michael Robert Solomon of New Brighton, a Minneapolis suburb, recruited at least five Boogaloo adherents to join him in Minnesota, including Ivan Harrison Hunter of Boerne, Texas, and Benjamin Ryan Teeter of Hampstead, North Carolina. The group made plans to meet in Minneapolis at 6:00 p.m. on May 28 at the Cub Food grocery store on 26th Avenue South off East Lake Street, near the epicenter of heavy rioting and looting. During the riots, the Boogaloo members were seen driving around Minneapolis, carrying firearms, and openly discussing a willingness to commit violent acts against police officers.

==== Burning of the third precinct police station ====
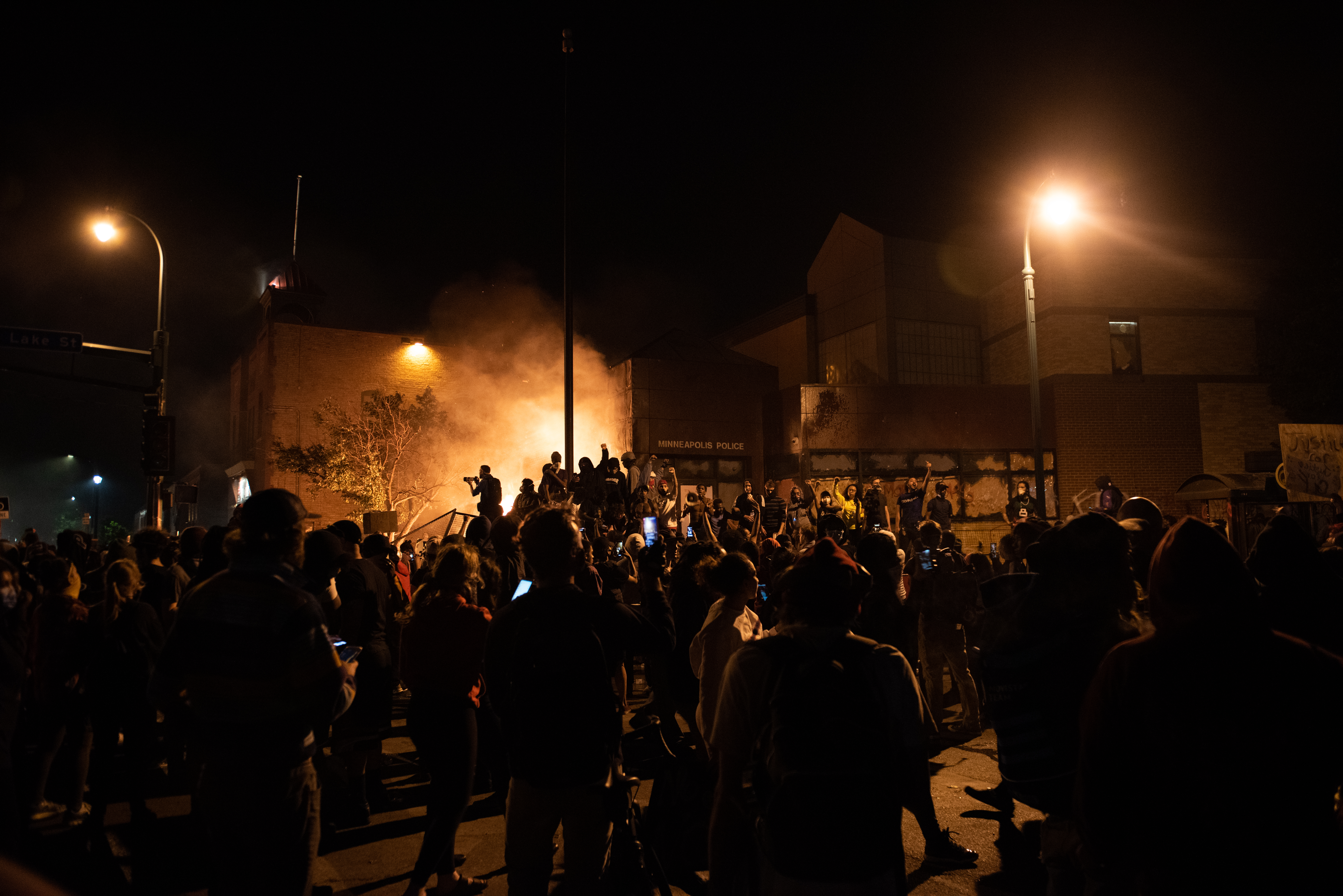
Demonstrators surround the Minneapolis police third precinct station as it is engulfed in flames, May 28, 2020

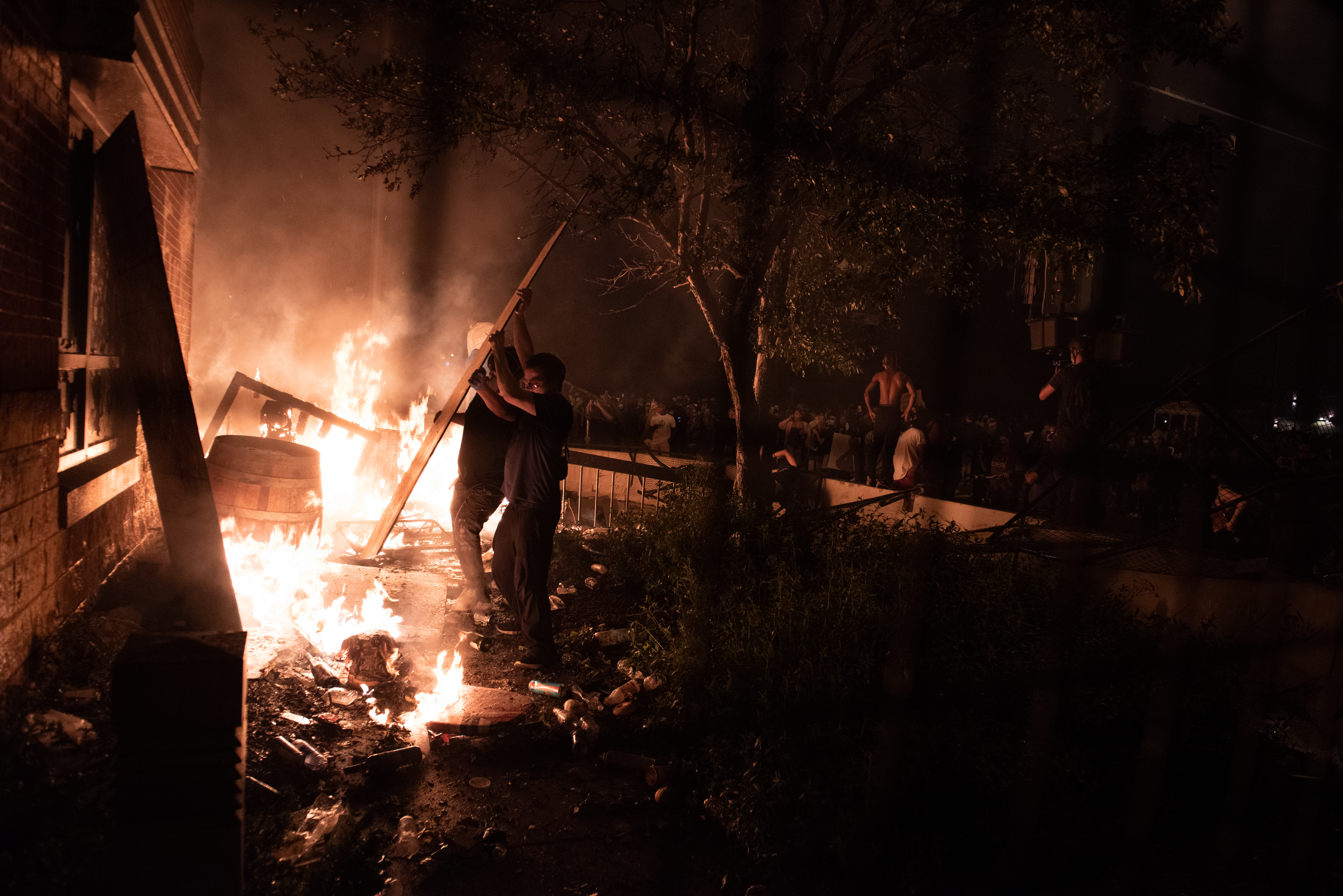
Rioters add debris to the fire, May 28, 2020

Late at night on May 28, the focus of demonstrators shifted to the Minneapolis third precinct police station building at the intersection of East Lake Street and Minnehaha Avenue. Some protesters threw objects at the officers guarding the building, who responded by firing rubber bullets in the crowd. Demonstrators began tearing down fencing that surrounded the precinct station and police responded with tear gas. As tensions in the area mounted, Frey gave the order to evacuate the station, a tactic he later said was to deescalate the situation and prevent further loss of life.

Officers retreating from the building loaded into squad vehicles and had to smash through a parking lot gate to escape, as it had been padlocked at some point by protesters. Demonstrators then moved in and threw bottles and debris at the fleeing officers who eventually made their way to a rendezvous site three blocks away. Demonstrators tore away fencing intended to stop trespassers from entering the building.

Bryce Williams of Staples and Davon Turner of Saint Paul worked together to light a Molotov cocktail, and then Turner took it into the building. Dylan Robinson of Brainerd then helped light a second Molotov cocktail. Branden Wolf of Saint Paul pushed materials into a fire at the building's entrance, intending to accelerate the flames. One of the Boogaloo adherents who had converged in Minneapolis, Ivan Hunter of Texas, participated in the chaos. Hunter shot 13 rounds at the building using an AK-47-style gun and entered the building to loot and help set it on fire. Two hours later, Hunter sent a text message to Steven Carrillo, the perpetrator of the 2020 boogaloo murders, and encouraged him to, “Go for police buildings”. Many others illegally entered the building.

Surrounded by a crowd of about 1,000 people, the station burned until the early morning hours of May 29 when firefighting crews reached the area and eventually extinguished fires. The several-hundred-member contingent of state patrol and National Guard troops on the ground in Minneapolis that night primarily escorted fire trucks and protected a Federal Reserve building and areas of downtown Minneapolis. Walz later remarked that the city had not given directions specifying where to deploy troops as the violence escalated on East Lake Street. State officials also remarked that the city's decision to abandon the precinct station was a misjudgment, allowing demonstrators to create a situation of "absolute chaos", in the words of Walz.

The burning of the police station was one of the vividest images of the unrest spreading across the nation. Several days later, a Monmouth University Polling Institute poll found that 54 percent of Americans thought that the burning of the precinct building was justified.

==== Inhalation death of Oscar Lee Stewart Jr. ====
As the intensity of demonstrations increased the night of May 28, dozens of businesses were looted and set on fire on East Lake Street in Minneapolis near the city's third police precinct station. Looters broke into the Minnehaha Lake Wine & Spirits liquor store across the street from the police station, passed out bottles to the crowd, and then set the store on fire. Looters broke into the nearby Max It Pawn store on East Lake Street. Montez Terriel Lee Jr. of Rochester, Minnesota, poured liquid accelerant around the shop and lit it on fire. Bystanders discovered that a person—later revealed as Oscar Lee Stewart Jr. of Burnsville, Minnesota—was trapped inside the building, but were unable to help guide him out after frantically removing some plywood from windows and shining flashlights inside. Fire crews that arrived later found the building too unstable for a rescue operation into the structure. Stewart became the second person to die during the riots as he succumbed to inhalation and burn injuries. His remains were left in a pile of rubble and were not recovered until nearly two months later. Lee was convicted of arson in federal court in 2022 and sentenced to 10 years in prison.

==== Widespread destruction in Saint Paul ====
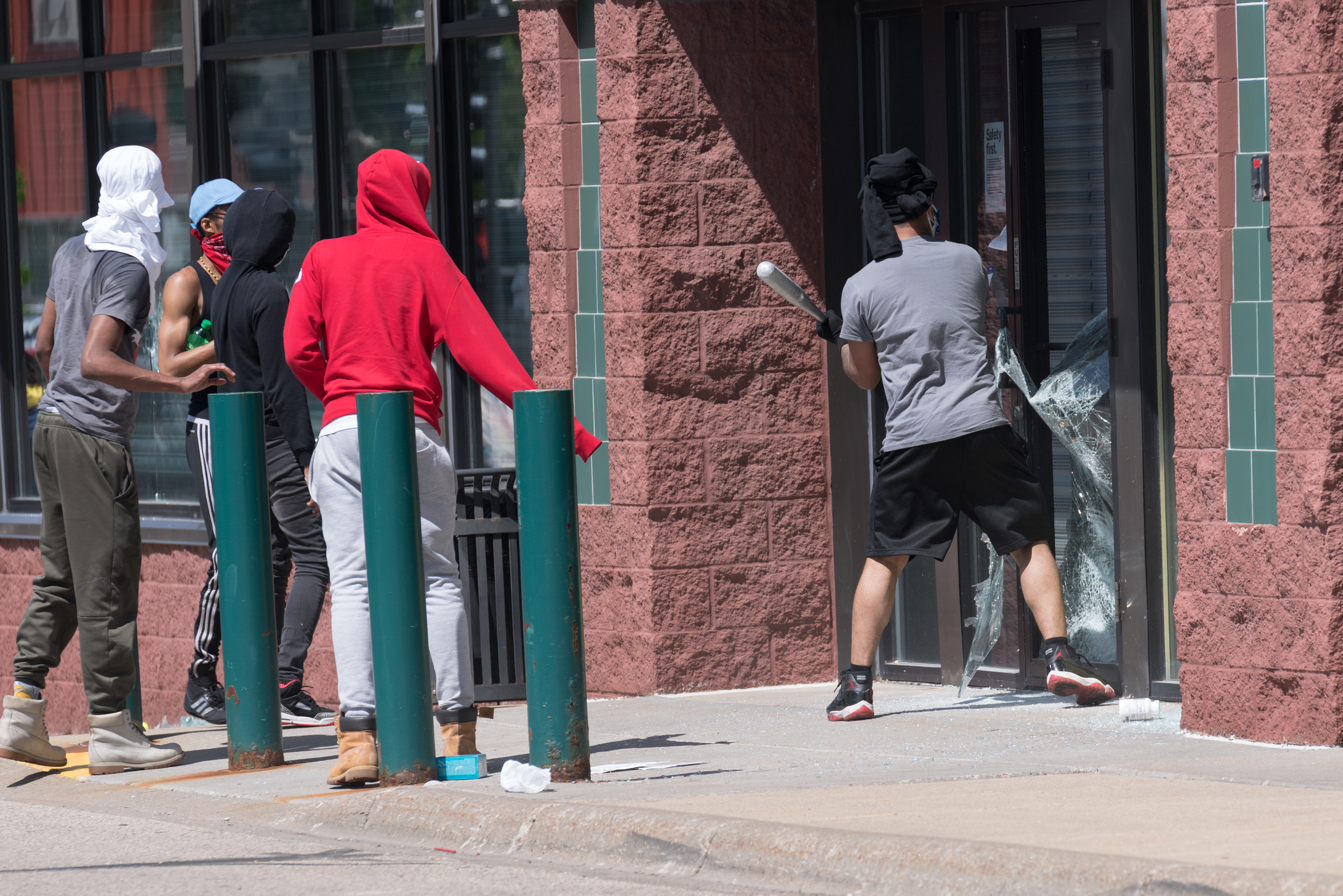
Glass door being smashed at the Verizon cellphone store on Hamline Avenue North in Saint Paul, May 28, 2020

In Saint Paul, which had been spared from widespread property destruction on the prior night, 170 businesses were damaged or looted and dozens of fires were started on May 28. The largest fires burned at a liquor store and other shops near Allianz Field soccer stadium at Snelling and University avenues; no major injuries were reported in those fires. Lloyd's Pharmacy on Snelling Avenue, which had a presence in the area since 1918, was looted over several hours and then set on fire, which burnt the building to the ground. Two shopping centers in Saint Paul near University Avenue, the Sun Ray Shopping Center and Midway Shopping Center, were extensively looted. At the Midway Shopping Center, rioters torched the Foot Locker store, and fires spread to the adjacent GameStop and Great Clips stores. Rioters also set a fire inside Gordon Parks High School and set fire to a Goodwill and several other storefronts in the Hamline-Midway neighborhood. Several of those who were setting fires in Saint Paul that day were residents of suburban cities or other cities outside the metropolitan area who traveled into the city to participate in the unrest.

==== Looting and property damage in suburban cities ====
By nightfall on May 28, looting and property destruction had reached several suburban communities in the Twin Cities. Near Saint Paul, the Rosedale Center shopping mall in Roseville was looted. In Blaine, several people broke into the Northtown Mall, but police responded to the scene and secured the facility. In Maple Grove, looters broke into several stores at the Arbor Lakes shopping center; police that responded to burglary reports made several arrests. Businesses in the northern suburban cities of Brooklyn Center, Crystal, Plymouth, and Robbinsdale also reported burglaries and property damage such as smashed doors or windows.

==== President Donald Trump reacts ====
Just before midnight local time on May 28, President Donald Trump posted a controversial statement on Twitter in reaction to the events in Minneapolis. He said, "These THUGS are dishonoring the memory of George Floyd, and I won't let that happen. Just spoke to Governor Tim Walz and told him that the Military is with him all the way. Any difficulty and we will assume control but, when the looting starts, the shooting starts. Thank you!" By 2:30 a.m. CDT, Twitter had flagged Trump's tweet for glorifying violence, which its guidelines prohibited.

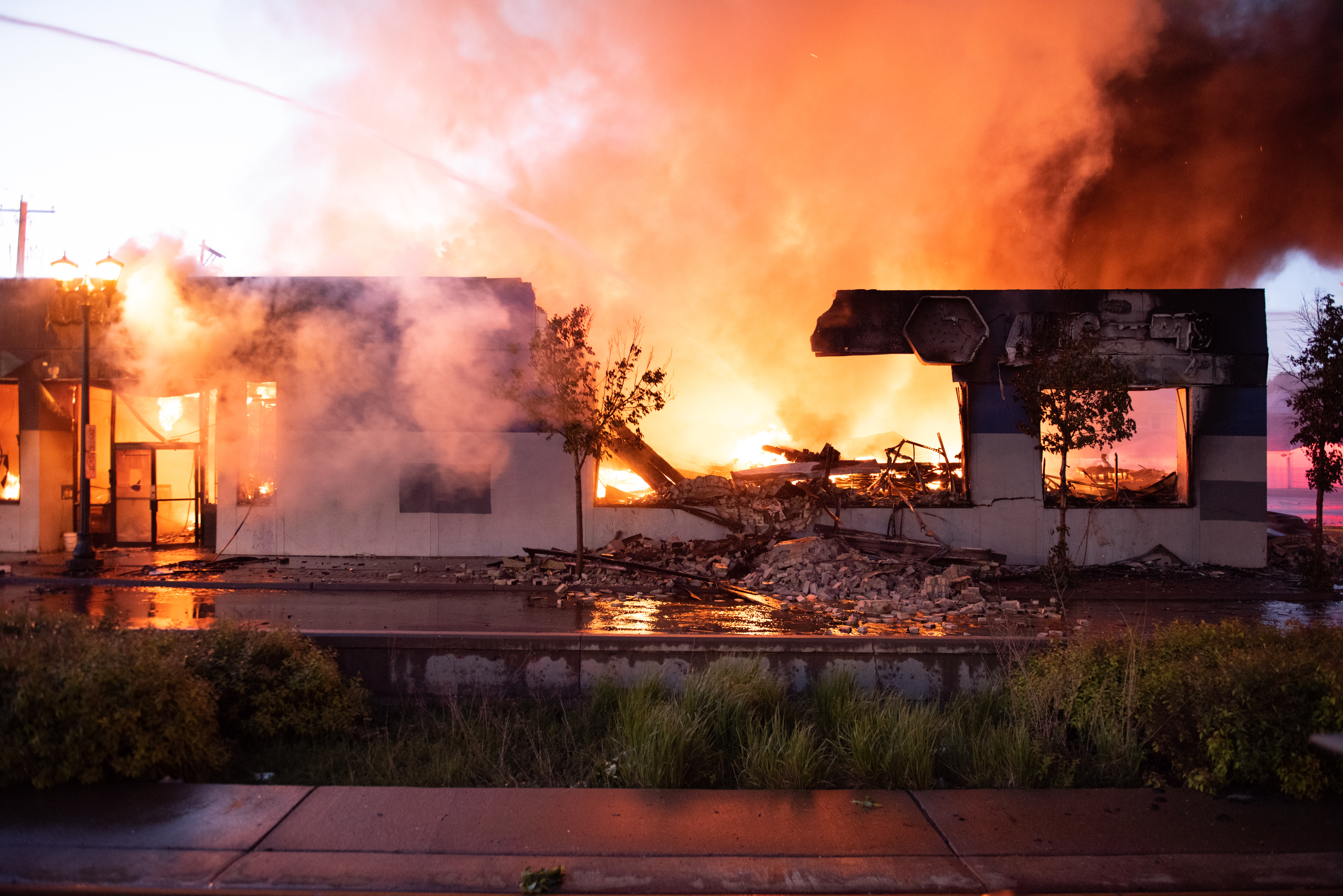
Fires at a NAPA Auto Parts store and adjacent businesses on University Avenue in Saint Paul, May 28, 2020

=== Friday, May 29, 2020 ===
==== Trump and local officials trade comments ====
In a follow-up to an earlier statement on Twitter, Trump said just after midnight local time on May 29, "I can't stand back & watch this happen to a great American City, Minneapolis. A total lack of leadership. Either the very weak Radical Left Mayor, Jacob Frey, get his act together and bring the City under control, or I will send in the National Guard & get the job done right….."

Frey addressed the media at 1:30 a.m. CDT as the city was battling multiple fires and violence. He acknowledged the anger in the community over Floyd's murder, but condemned the actions of rioters and looters. In defense of his decision to have police withdraw from the third precinct station to deescalate tension, he said, "Brick and mortar is not as important as life". He also reacted to Trump's tweets and criticized the president for stoking tension and casting blame on officials during an active crisis event.

==== Dakota County government building arson attack ====
In the suburban City of Apple Valley during the early morning hours of May 29, Minnesota residents Fornandous Cortez Henderson of Savage and Garrett Ziegler of Long Lake attacked the Dakota County Western Service Center—a local government building that contained a U.S. passport office, court rooms, and other official services. Henderson had targeted the building as revenge for the appearances he made before a court located inside it and because he was angry with law enforcement for Floyd's death. The two men broke several windows with baseball bats and threw Molotov cocktails inside. Some of the incendiary devices ignited and caused fire and smoke damage. The men also poured flammable liquids around the building and attempted to start other fires. Law enforcement that responded to a building alarm arrested Ziegler and Henderson as they fled on foot.

==== Streets cleared and curfews announced ====
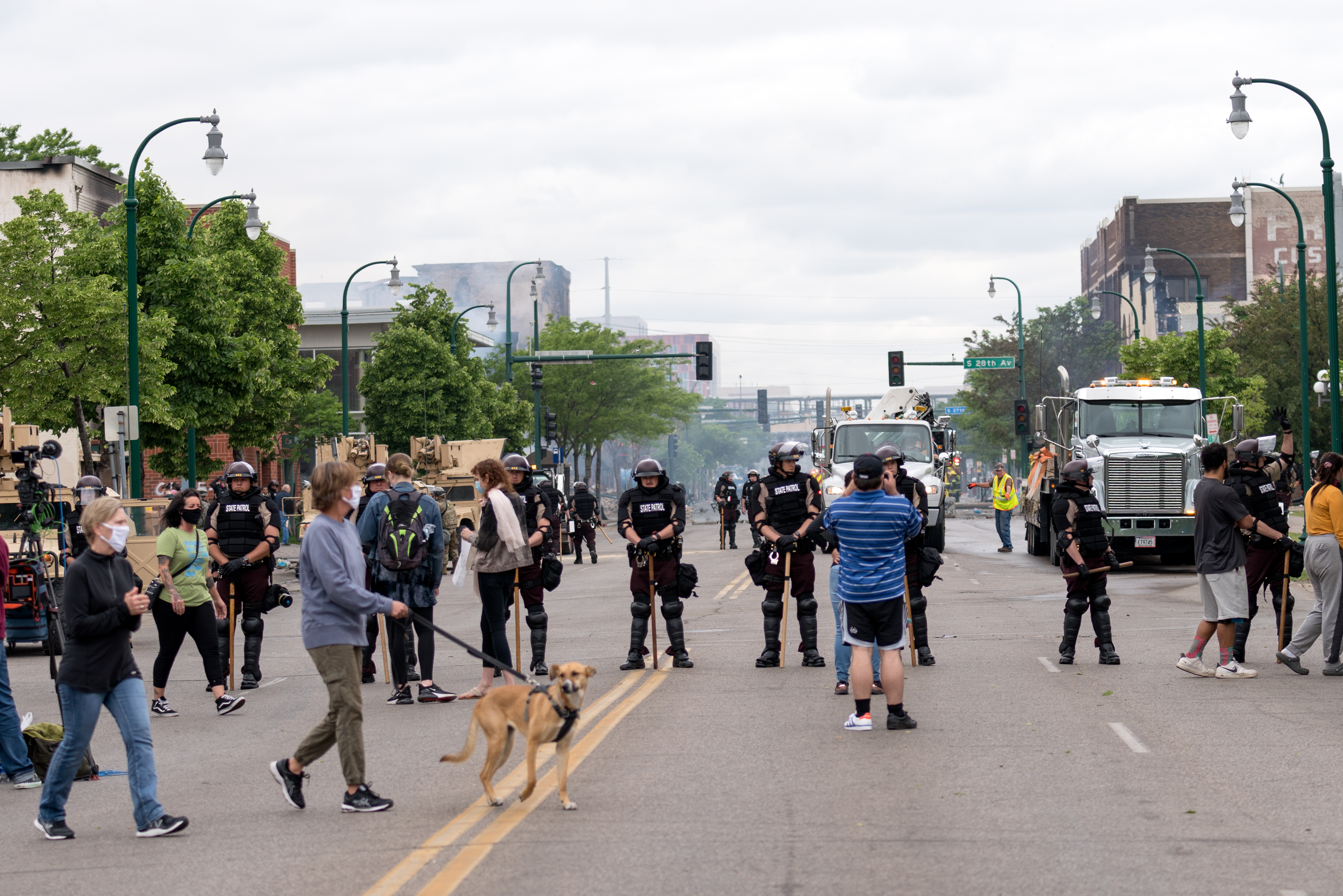
Residents and Minnesota State Patrol officers on East Lake Street in Minneapolis, May 29, 2020

At daybreak on May 29, National Guard troops and Minnesota State Patrol officers began clearing people out of the area of the third police precinct station near East Lake Street and Minnehaha Avenue in Minneapolis. At about 6:00 a.m., patrol officers arrested CNN reporter Omar Jimenez and his camera crew as they were filming a live news report on television. After intervention from Walz, the crew was released an hour later.

Later in the morning, U.S. defense secretary Mark Esper, General Mark Milley, and Attorney General Bill Barr privately discouraged Trump from invoking the Insurrection Act to deploy military troops to Minneapolis.

The same day, Major-General Jon Jensen, the highest-ranking official in the Minnesota National Guard, expressed concern at local city leaders due to a lack of clarity and direction regarding the National Guard's mission after being called upon in response to the unrest. In the afternoon, Governor Walz imposed a state curfew for the cities of Minneapolis and Saint Paul that would run from 8:00 p.m. to 6:00 a.m. on May 29 and 30. The order prohibited travel in streets or gathering at public places. Frey also issued an overlapping local curfew in Minneapolis. Local police forces in suburban cities made plans to increase patrols.

==== Chauvin charged but other charges pending ====
In the late afternoon on May 29, Hennepin County attorney Michael O. Freeman charged Derek Chauvin, the officer who knelt on Floyd's neck as he died, with third-degree murder and second-degree manslaughter. The charging documents summarized portions of the preliminary autopsy findings by Hennepin County medical examiner Andrew Baker that had not yet been released publicly in full. The court documents mentioned contributing factors leading up to Floyd's death in addition to the physical trauma of Chauvin's neck restraint, which added to public confusion and anger as the protests intensified. Some called for Baker to be fired. New charges for officers Lane, Kueng, and Thao, who were at the scene of Floyd's murder, also remained pending. Protesters who had demanded immediate murder charges against all four officers were disappointed; four days had already elapsed since Floyd's murder. Many protesters intensified focus on the demand for criminal charges in their messaging that day.

The Target Corporation expanded its closure of stores to 73 in Minnesota with the violence not appearing to abate. Several thousand people rallied peacefully in Minneapolis in the afternoon, culminating in a march on to Interstate 35W where demonstrators knelt. The de-escalation strategy of abandoning the third precinct station the previous night, however, was said to have had little effect on quelling unrest later on Friday. Despite the announcement of the charge against Chauvin, protesters said they would defy curfew until all four police officers at the scene of Floyd's death were charged criminally.

==== Violence escalates again by nightfall ====
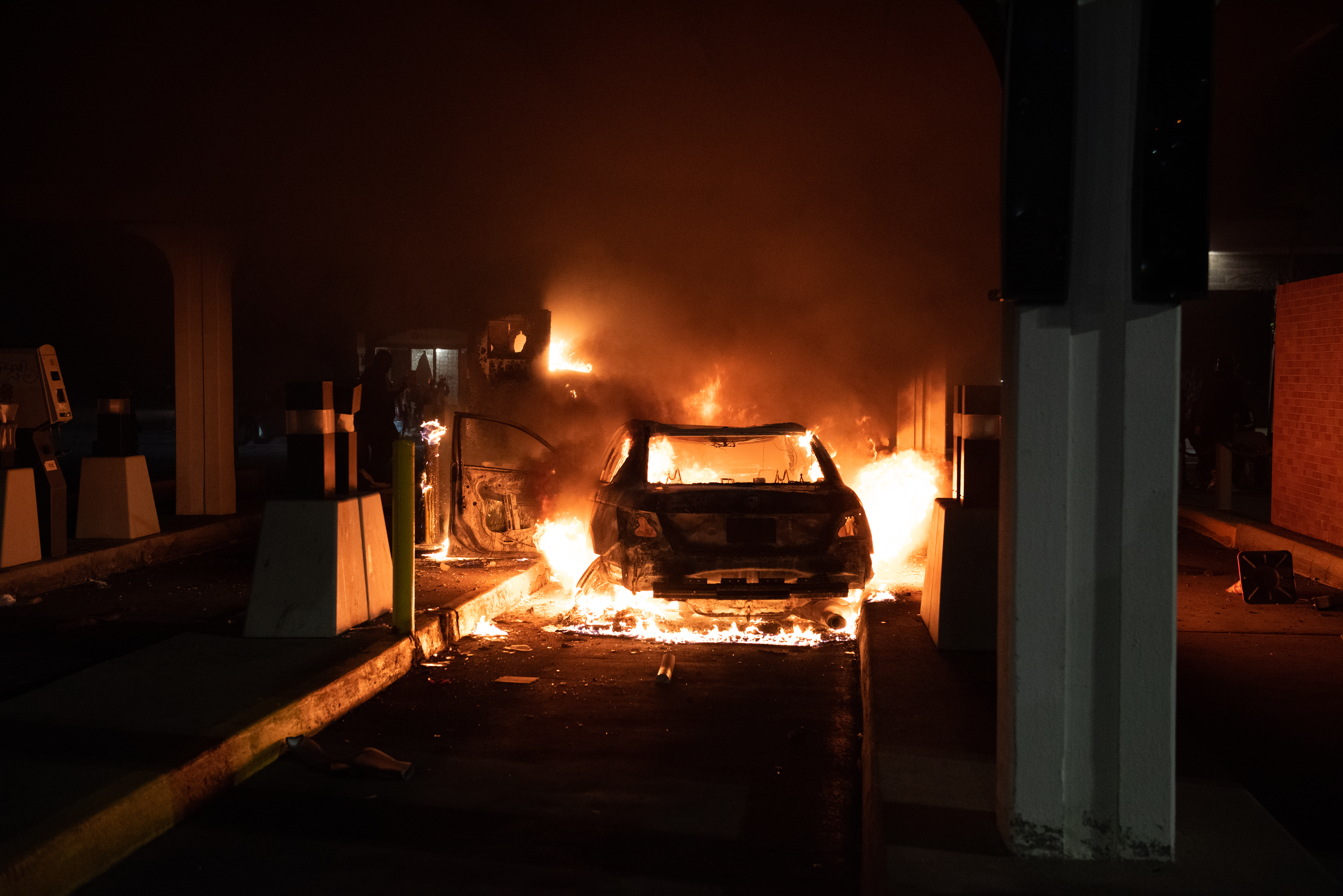
Fire at a Wells Fargo bank on Nicollet Avenue in Minneapolis, May 29, 2020

Riots broke out again the night of Friday, May 29 and continued into early morning of Saturday, May 30. Demonstrators had tear gas fired on them in rallies at the abandoned third precinct building in Minneapolis. Later in the night, the police presence diminished and several cars were set on fire.

Much of the action the night of May 29 took place near the Minneapolis police fifth precinct station at Lake Street and Nicollet Avenue. Law enforcement presence was reportedly "undetectable" as violence in Minneapolis quickly grew until just before midnight, when police officers, state troopers, and members of the National Guard began confronting rioters with tear gas and mass force. Seventy-five fires were reported across Minneapolis that night.

Officials later said that the 350 police officers at the site of rioting near the Minneapolis fifth precinct station were vastly outnumbered by the crowds. Walz explained that the scope of the chaos, the time it takes to mobilize guard troops, and the mobile nature of the crowds made it difficult to direct response forces. Minnesota Department of Public Safety commissioner John Harrington said that protests were active at several sites through the city and that there were not enough officers to safely and successfully undertake multiple missions.

As the events unfolded that night, the Pentagon placed members of the Military Police Corps from Fort Bragg and Fort Drum on stand-by, preparing for possible deployment to the Twin Cities if requested by Walz. Walz later declined the offer and activated all of the state's National Guard, up to 13,200 troops.

=== Saturday, May 30, 2020 ===
==== Overnight destruction ====
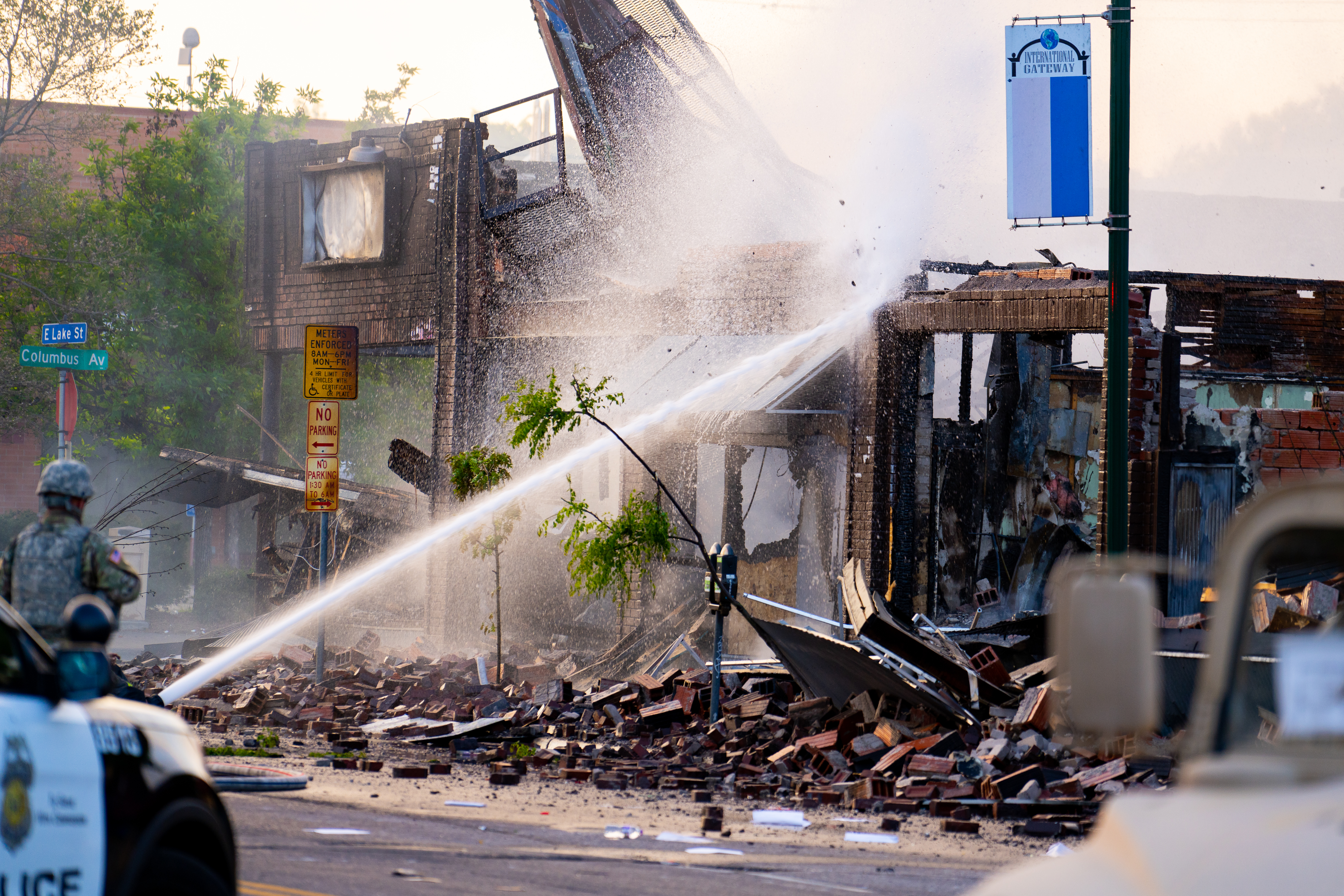
Firefighters at East Lake Street and Columbus Avenue in Minneapolis, May 30, 2020

Overnight from May 29 to May 30, smoke and the sound of helicopters filled the sky in Minneapolis through the night as multiple fires burned near the fifth police precinct station in Minneapolis. A United States Post Office on Nicollet Avenue, a Wells Fargo Bank branch, and several gas stations, among other businesses, blazed overnight. Several businesses also burned on West Broadway Avenue in north Minneapolis, including a barbershop that was destroyed by fire. Officials were unable to immediately attend to major fires, citing security concerns at the sites, but later reached them when they could be accompanied by National Guard and police patrols.

For the second time in as many nights, officials held a press conference at 1:30 a.m. CDT, but this time in Saint Paul and led by the governor and state officials. Some officials speculated that much of the destruction was being caused by people from outside the state, a claim that was later contradicted by arrest records of protesters and that officials rescinded. It was reported that mayor Frey and governor Walz appeared visibly exhausted as they made emotional pleas to the public about Floyd's murder and the escalation of violence. "The absolute chaos — this is not grieving, and this is not making a statement [about an injustice] that we fully acknowledge needs to be fixed — this is dangerous," Walz said. "You need to go home."

==== Mix of peaceful protests and confrontational riots ====
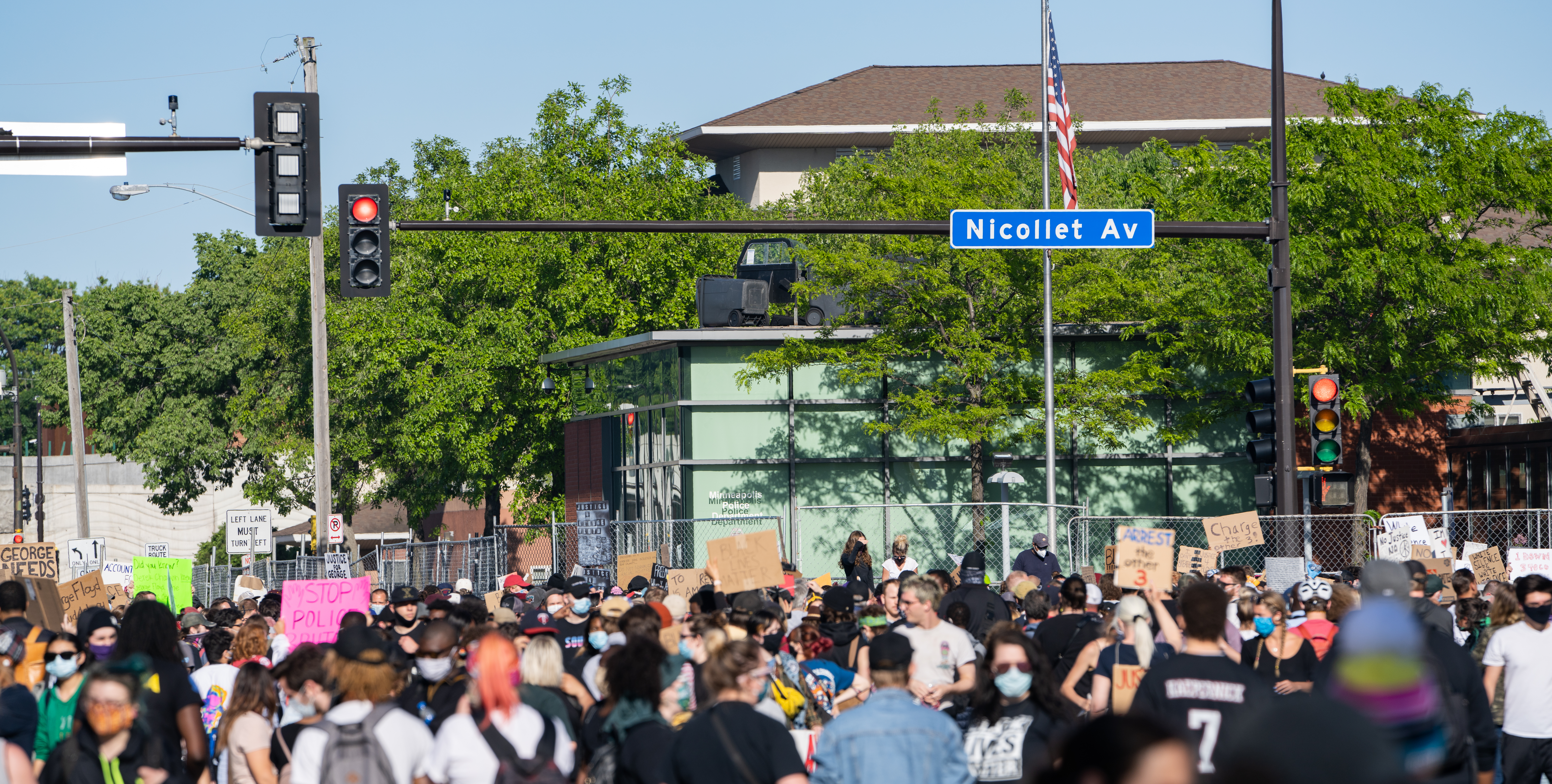
A protest on Nicollet Avenue at the fifth precinct police station in Minneapolis, May 30, 2020.

Officials mobilized National Guard troops throughout Saturday, May 30, expecting even larger crowds. Groups of people continued to gather at George Floyd Square, the makeshift memorial at the site of Floyd's arrest and subsequent murder. More than 1,000 protesters gathered outside the home of Michael Freeman, the attorney for Hennepin County and initial prosecutor of the four Minneapolis police officers involved in the murder of George Floyd, and caused minor damage to the house.

By nightfall, demonstrations in Minneapolis were a mix of peaceful gatherings and others that involved property destruction. Minneapolis police reported that a group of protesters near Hiawatha Avenue and Lake Street were attacking police by throwing various objects, and deployed more units to the area. That night after curfew, police fired tear gas at a group of protesters who were attempting to march from Minneapolis to Saint Paul via the Lake Street Bridge. Police also fired rubber bullets, paint canisters, and tear gas at sitting protesters and journalists outside the Minneapolis fifth precinct police station, resulting in serious injuries.

==== Police assault of Jaleel Stallings ====
At about 10:53 p.m. on May 30, Jaleel Stallings, a 27-year-old man from Saint Paul, was part of a group of people in a parking lot on East Lake Street between 14th and 15th avenues in Minneapolis who were protecting businesses from looting, in defiance of the curfew order. Minneapolis police officers who were in an unmarked white van encountered the group and fired rubber bullets without advance warning or announcing themselves as police. Stallings, believing the officers might be white supremacists firing live rounds, returned three rounds of defensive gunfire, aiming low and at the ground. When the van stopped and a SWAT team exited and identified themselves as police, Stallings dropped his gun and lay down on the ground to surrender and verbally apologized to the officers. Minneapolis police officer Justin Stetson allegedly kicked and punched Stallings several times in the head as the officers arrested him, with the events being filmed on law enforcement body cameras. Stallings suffered a broken eye socket.

==== Full government mobilization ====
By Saturday night, the Minnesota National Guard was approaching full mobilization. No buildings were set on fire in Minneapolis and Saint Paul, unlike the previous three nights. After May 30, violent riots subsided and protests returned to being largely peaceful events.

=== Sunday, May 31, 2020 ===
==== Troop deployment and peaceful rallies ====
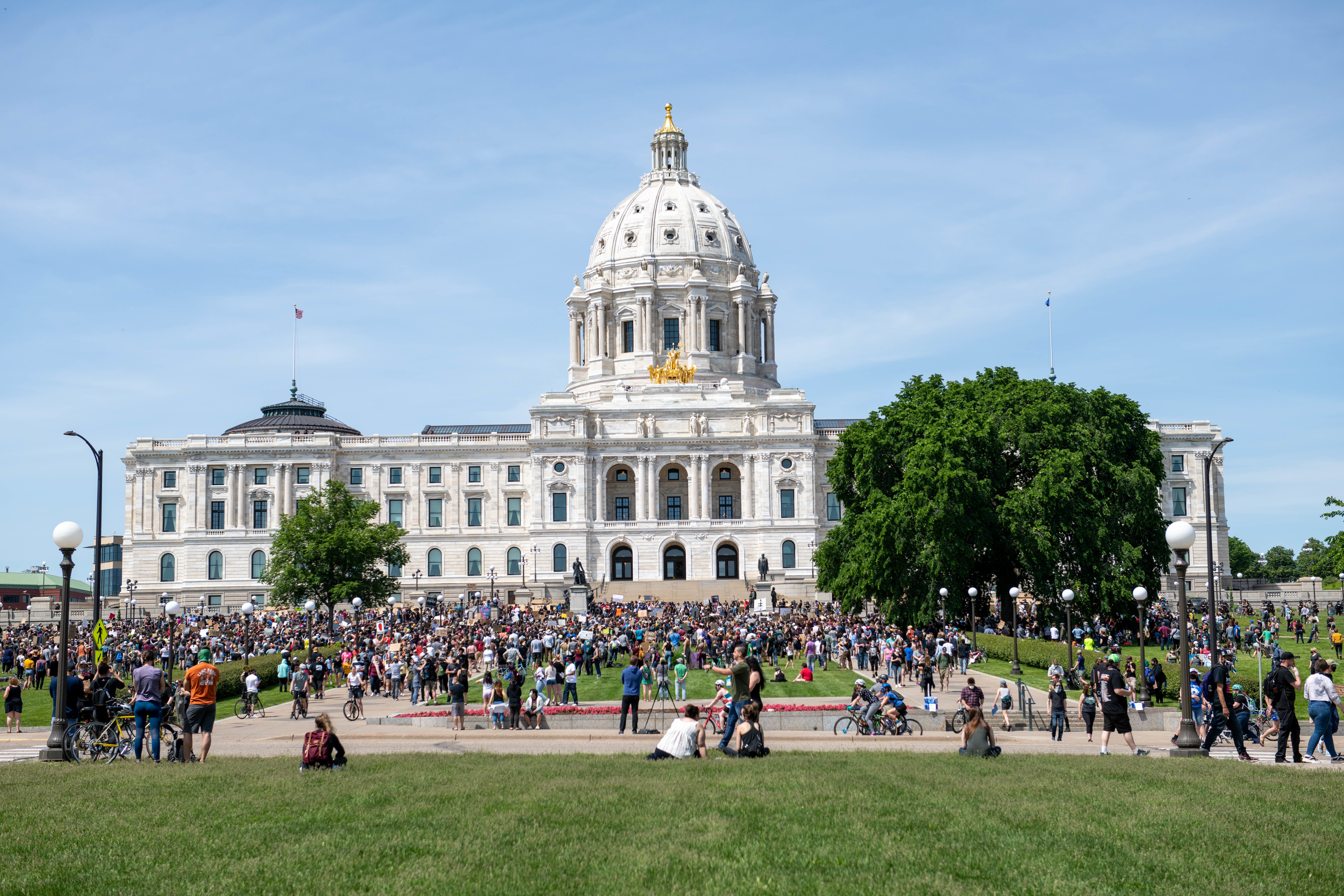
Protesters at the state capitol in Saint Paul, May 31, 2020

By late morning on May 31, several thousand Minnesota National Guard troops were conducting missions. Protests and rallies were held at various locations throughout the metropolitan region. Crowds of people once again gathered at the site of Floyd's arrest and subsequent murder. Speakers at a "Justice for George Floyd" rally at the state capitol building in Saint Paul spoke about police brutality and called for the arrest of the other three officers at the scene of Floyd's murder. A peaceful crowd marched westbound on I-94 before heading down University Avenue in Saint Paul. Later in the day, Walz and Freeman agreed that Minnesota attorney general Keith Ellison would assist in the investigation of Floyd's murder.

==== Tanker truck incident on I-35W ====
Shortly after 6:00 p.m. on May 31, a crowd of 5,000 to 6,000 people gathered on the I-35W bridge over the Mississippi River in Minneapolis and, believing police forces had fully closed the interstate highway after they marched on to it, began taking a knee. A semi-truck tanker drove northbound through an unbarricaded section of the highway and into the protesters, causing the crowd to part ways to avoid being run down. The driver—a 35-year-old man from Otsego, Minnesota, returning from a fuel delivery—initially came to a halt, but then tried to continue driving forward, until he was pulled from his cab and beaten by the surrounding crowd. He suffered minor injuries, as some of the protesters attempted to protect him.

A live social media video captured a person pointing a gun at the truck driver and shooting two rounds into the truck's front tire. Bystanders brought the truck driver to the police, who then pepper-sprayed the crowd. The driver was taken to Hennepin County Medical Center, then released into the custody of the Bureau of Criminal Apprehension, which initially charged him with assault. No serious injuries to the people on the bridge were reported, though one protester suffered abrasions during the incident. Led by the Minnesota State Patrol and the Hennepin County Sheriff's Office, officials cited 318 people for unlawful assembly in connection to the incident.

=== June 1–7, 2020 ===
==== Memorials and peaceful gatherings ====
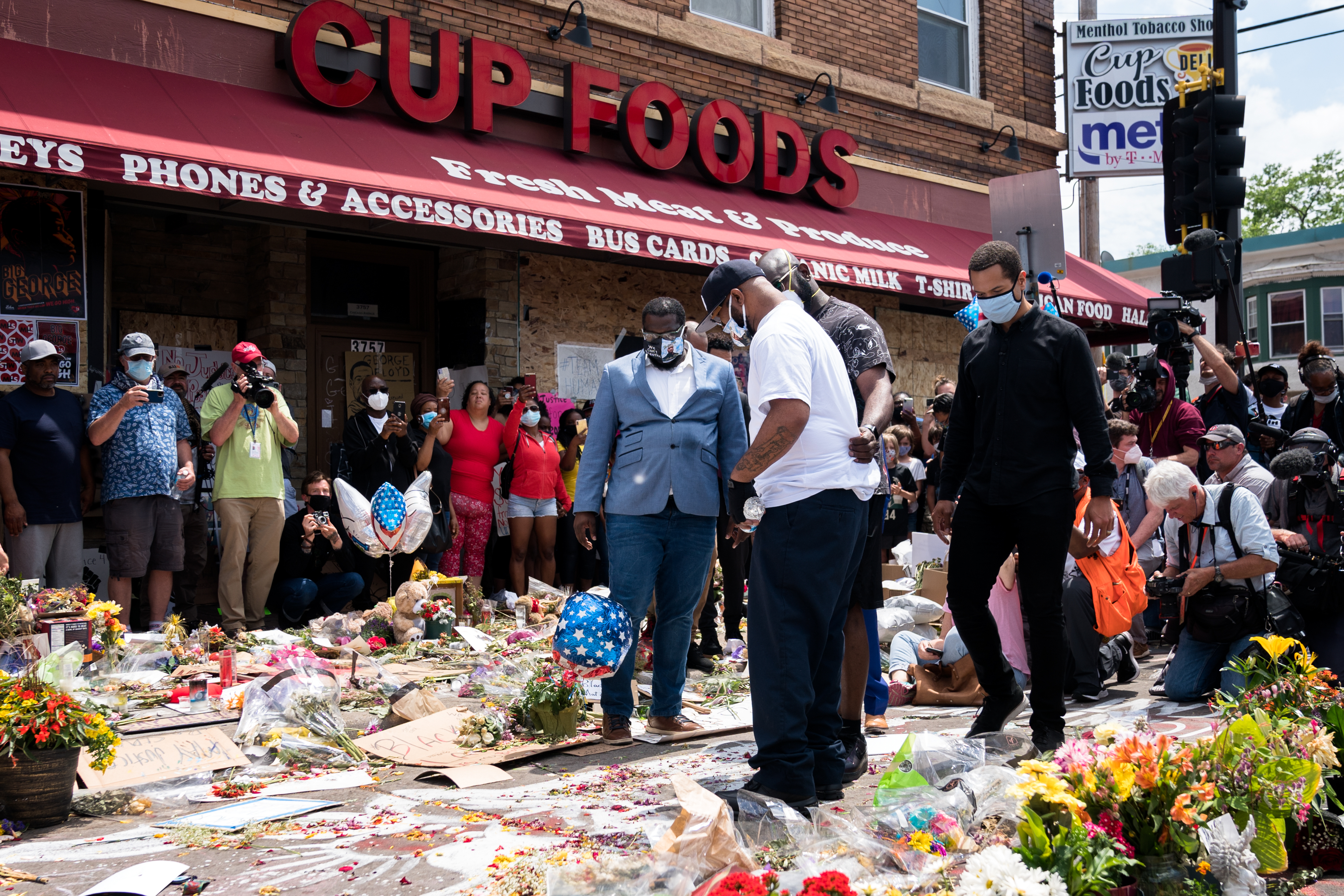
Terrence Floyd visits a memorial outside Cup Foods, June 1, 2020

On Monday, June 1, 2020, Governor Walz began the process of demobilizing the state's National Guard, a process that would take several days. Two autopsy reports were publicized—one by the Hennepin County medical examiner and one by doctors hired by Floyd's family—both of which ruled Floyd's death a homicide.

Thousands gathered peacefully at the Minnesota State Capitol building in Saint Paul and marched to the Governor's Residence, calling for police reforms and the prosecution of all four officers who were involved in Floyd's murder. Nearly 30 Saint Paul police officers on the outskirts of the rally took a knee, which drew criticism from rally organizers who felt the gesture was a hollow public relations stunt and asked them to leave. Activist Nekima Levy Armstrong, citing distrust of Attorney General Keith Ellison, demanded that Floyd's case be handled outside the state. Governor Tim Walz attended part of the rally but did not speak publicly.

Floyd's family addressed a crowd at the 38th and Chicago intersection and encouraged people to continue protesting, but to do so peacefully. Terrance Floyd, George's brother, said that instead of destroying property, demonstrators should, "Educate yourself, and know who you're voting for. That's how we're going to hit them ... Let's switch it up."

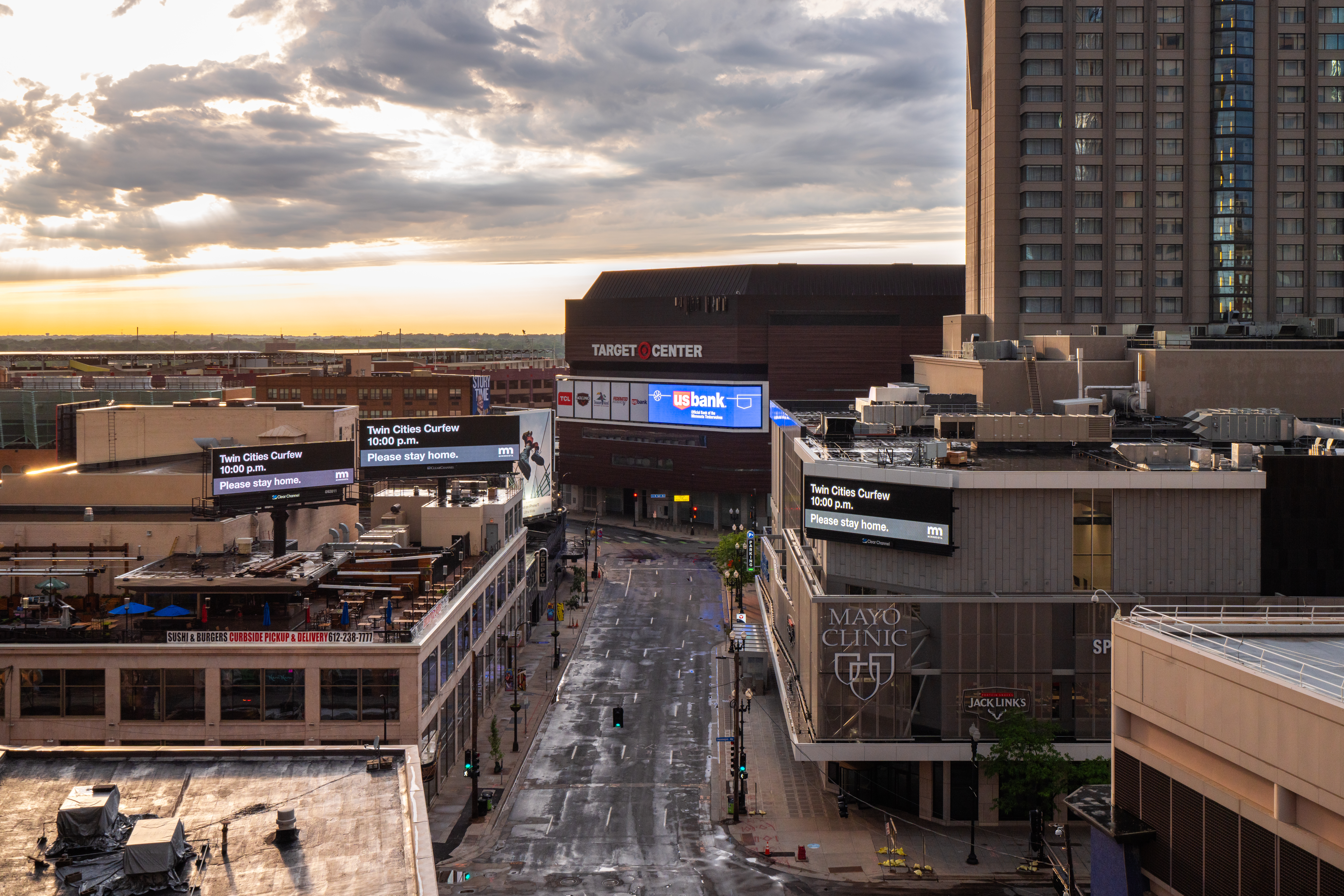
Billboards in downtown Minneapolis announcing a 10:00 p.m. curfew, June 2, 2020

On Tuesday, June 2, 2020, thousands of people gathered for several peaceful protests across the Twin Cities. Reflecting on social justice action during the United States civil rights era, faith leaders held corresponding marches in south Minneapolis and Saint Paul. A dozen area high school students organized a sit-in at the state capitol building in Saint Paul that drew an estimated crowd of 3,000 people. A National Guard troop member was given the opportunity to briefly address the crowd to explain their mission to restore order and protect peaceful assembly. Somber protests continued at the Minneapolis intersection were Floyd was murdered and a group remained after the curfew time came and went.

On Wednesday, June 3, 2020, Minnesota attorney general Keith Ellison, who four days earlier took over the case against the officers involved in Floyd's murder, upgraded the murder charges against former officer Chauvin and charged former officers Kueng, Lane, and Thao with aiding and abetting second-degree murder. Floyd's family called the charges "a significant step forward on the road to justice". Walz, who visited the Floyd memorial at 38th Street and Chicago Avenue in Minneapolis where crowds continued to gather, said he recognized "that the anguish driving protests around the world is about more than one tragic incident".

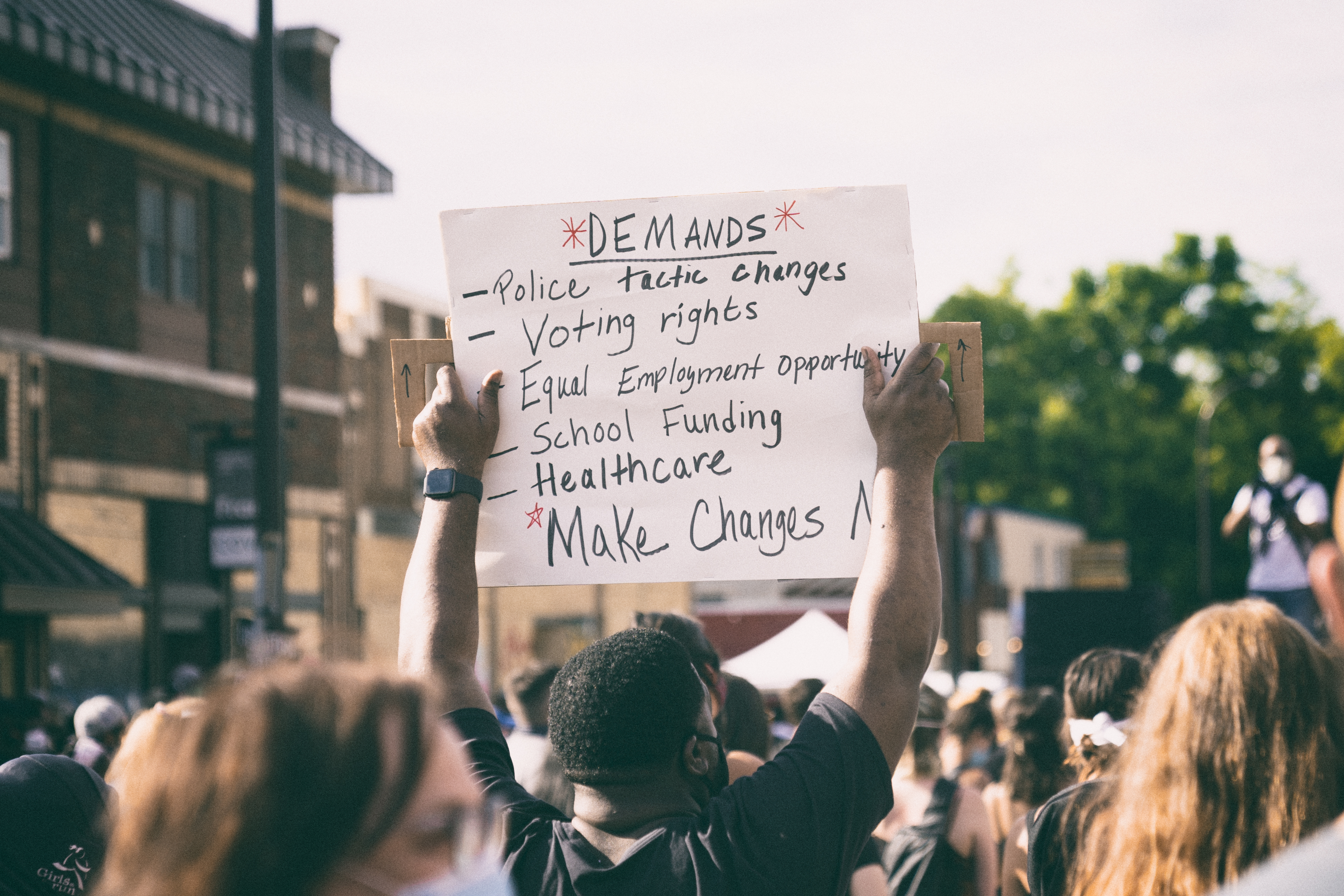
Protest rally at 38th and Chicago in Minneapolis, June 4, 2020

On Thursday, June 4, 2020, some protests continued Thursday as the family of George Floyd held a memorial service for him at North Central University in Minneapolis, about three miles (4.8 km) from where he was killed on May 25. Many state and local officials attended, including Governor Walz, U.S. senators Amy Klobuchar and Tina Smith, U.S. representative Ilhan Omar, Saint Paul mayor Melvin Carter, Minneapolis mayor Jacob Frey, and Police Chief Medaria Arradondo. The service also drew national officials and civil rights leaders, such as Martin Luther King III, Reverends Jesse Jackson and Al Sharpton, as well as several celebrity figures. A reverent crowd gathered at nearby Elliot Park to listen to a broadcast of the memorial on loudspeakers where free food, groceries, and dry goods were provided.

On Friday, June 5, 2020, thousands gathered for a rally at U.S. Bank Stadium in Minneapolis to honor the life of Floyd and call for police reform measures. Former NBA basketball player Royce White, a featured speaker at the event that brought civil rights organizations and professional athletes together, called for the resignation of police union president Bob Kroll. The protest group marched through the city in the early evening.

As nights grew calmer, curfews that had been in place since the previous Friday ended in the Twin Cities on June 5, 2020.

==== "Defund police" rallies and pledge ====
On Saturday, June 6, 2020, thousands of protesters marched in Minneapolis in an event led by local organization Black Visions Collective. Protesters gathered at the city's Bottineau Field Park, marched past the Minneapolis Police Federation's union headquarters, and ended at Mayor Frey's private residence. The march featured chants of "George Floyd!" and "Black Lives Matter!" and pleas to defund the police. At Frey's home, the crowd demanded that he come outside, and then when Frey appeared asked if he supported abolishing the city's police force. After Frey responded that he did not, the crowd ordered him to leave and booed him away. At the rally, United States Representative Ilhan Omar, whose Minnesota's 5th congressional district encompassed Minneapolis, denounced the city's police force as "inherently beyond reform".

A "defund police" event at Powderhorn Park, June 7, 2020

On Sunday, June 7, 2020, at a Powderhorn Park rally organized by Black Visions Collective and several other black-led social justice organizations, nine of the 13 members of the Minneapolis City Council vowed before a large crowd to dismantle the city's police department. Onstage taking the pledge were council president Lisa Bender, vice president Andrea Jenkins and council members Alondra Cano, Phillipe Cunningham, Jeremiah Ellison, Steve Fletcher, Cam Gordon, Andrew Johnson, and Jeremy Schroeder. At the rally, Bender said of the pledge to abolish the city's police force, "Our efforts at incremental reform have failed. Period." Council member Linea Palmisano attended the rally as an audience member, but did not go on stage or take the pledge, and council members Lisa Goodman and Kevin Reich did not attend nor agree to the pledge. The June 7 pledge by nine city council members, though it represented a veto-proof majority, did not actually disband the Minneapolis police force and details about the next steps in the process were not defined at the time. Some activists wanted to consider the idea of unarmed crisis response personnel and re-purposing the police department's $193 million annual budget for education, food, housing, and health care.

==== End of government mobilization ====
A multi-agency government command that responded to the civil unrest demobilized on Monday, June 7, 2020, exactly two weeks after Floyd's murder. The government response was led by Minnesota Department of Public Safety and had participation of federal agencies, Minnesota National Guard, Minnesota Department of Public Safety, Minnesota State Patrol, and Minnesota Department of Natural Resources. The command had provided security for some events, such as the June 4 memorial in Elliot Park, but noted that events leading up to and on June 7 were not violent. By June 7, the State of Minnesota had pressed 7,123 members of the Minnesota National Guard into duty under the command of Major General Jon A. Jensen in the largest deployment in the state since World War II. The state command had also mobilized 575 state patrol troopers and 190 conservation officers for the riot response.

=== Aftermath ===
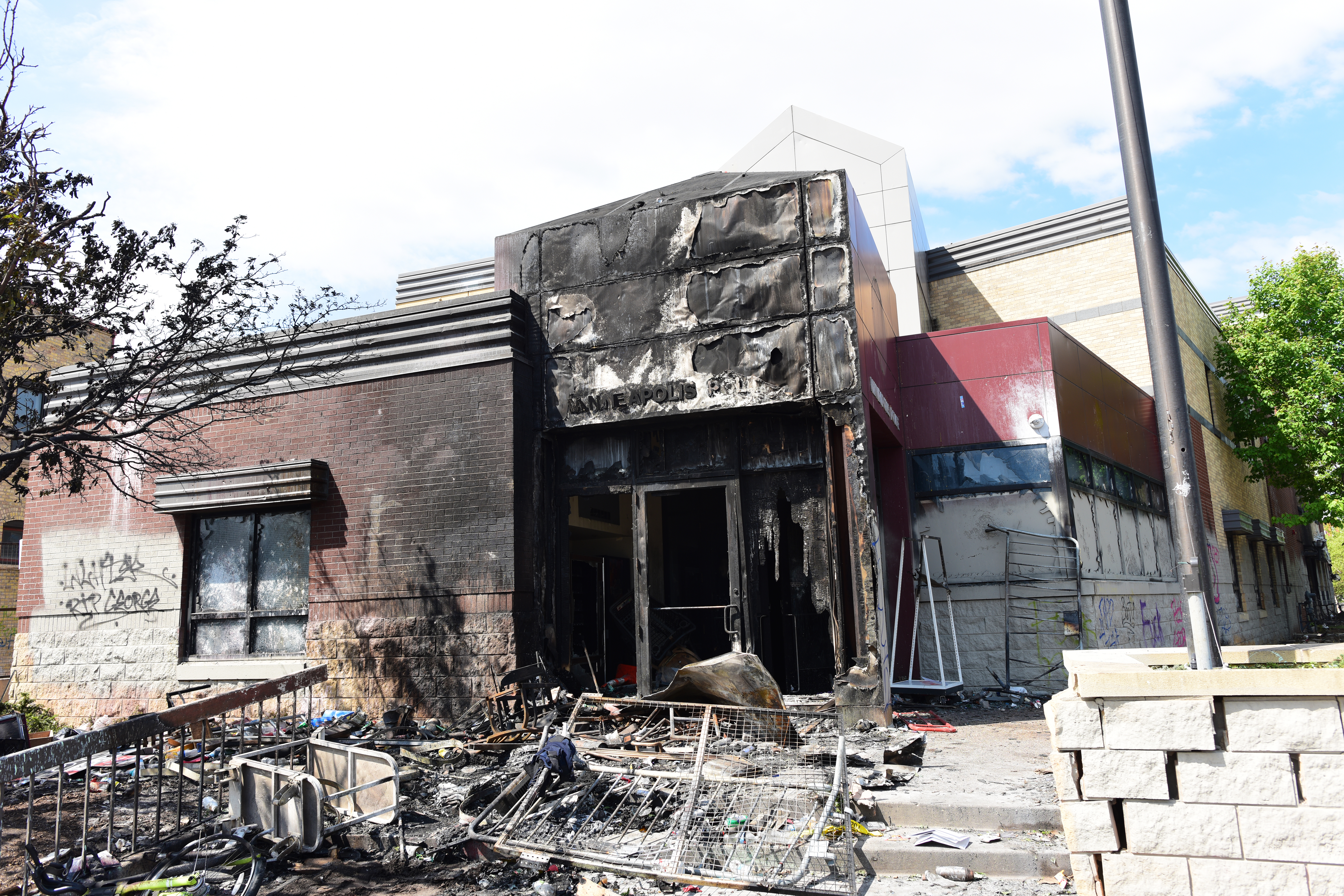
The damaged 3rd Precinct police station in Minneapolis, May 30, 2020.

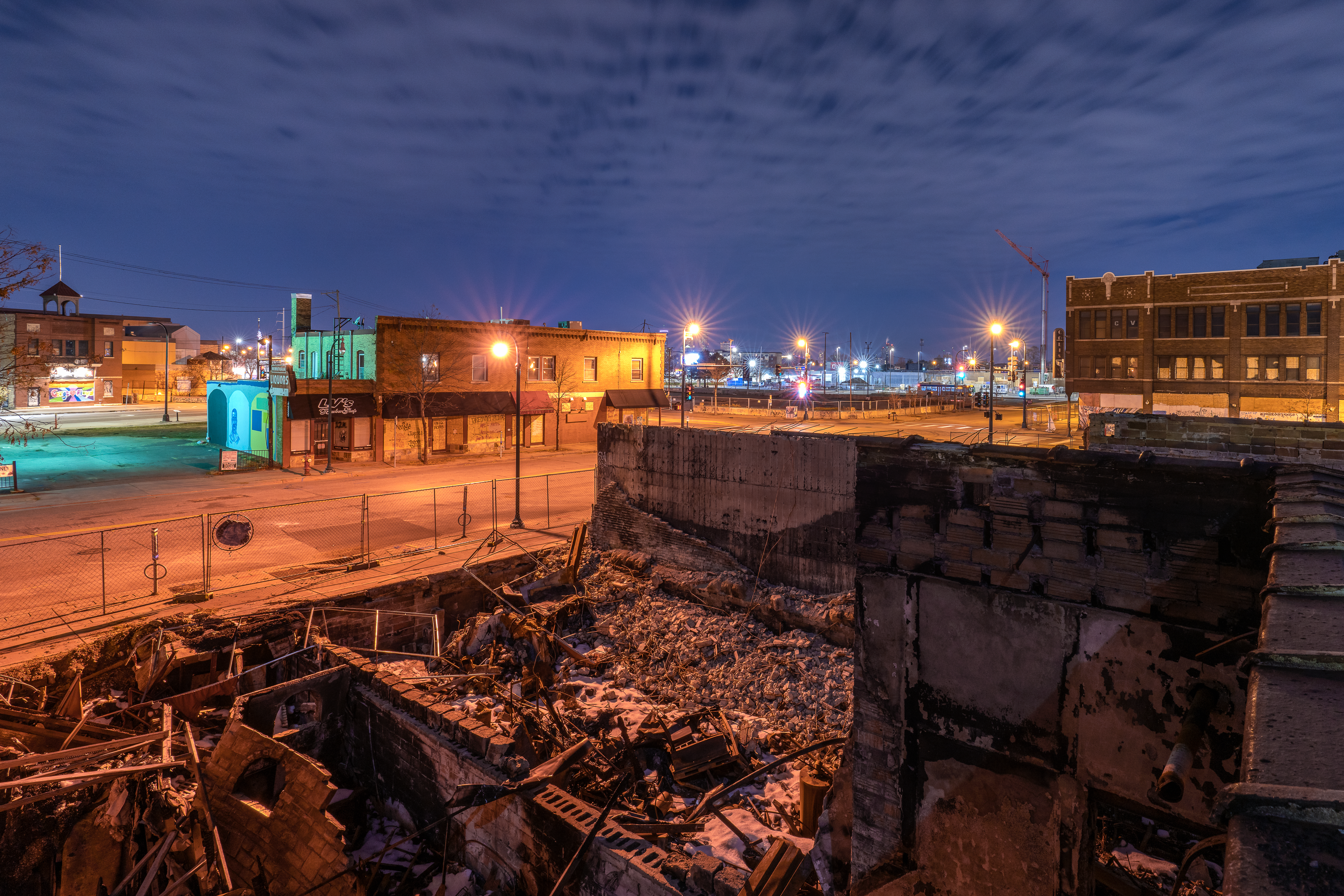
Ruins and boarded up buildings in Minneapolis, October 19, 2020

By early June 2020, nearly 1,500 property locations in the Twin Cities metropolitan region had been damaged by vandalism, fire, and/or looting, with some buildings reduced to rubble and dozens of others completely destroyed by fire. The heaviest damage occurred in Minneapolis along a 5-mile (8.0 km) stretch on Lake Street between the city's third and fifth police precincts and in Saint Paul along a 3.5-mile (5.6 km) stretch of University Avenue in the Midway area. Reports of property destruction in the metropolitan region reached from the northern suburbs of Blaine and Maple Grove to the southern suburb of Apple Valley. Most of the arrests of demonstrators that later resulted in criminal charges were for acts of property destruction and rioting that occurred by June 1, 2020. Estimates of property damage in the region were upwards of $500 million, making the local unrest in the Minneapolis-Saint Paul area the second most destructive in United States history, after the 1992 Los Angeles riots. About 60% of the financial losses were uninsured. Local officials estimated that rebuilding damaged business corridors in the Minneapolis-Saint Paul region would take 10 years.

In the mornings after nights of heavy rioting, hundreds of residents with snow shovels and brooms went to affected areas to clean up trash, graffiti, broken glass, and the remnants of damaged buildings. Residents organized food drives after many convenience stores and grocery stores were destroyed or closed due to the unrest. Vibrant works of street art later appeared all over the Twin Cities on boarded-up buildings and other surfaces that honored George Floyd's memory, contained racial justice themes, and showed community solidarity.

At least two deaths occurred during the initial wave of civil disorder. Calvin Horton Jr., a 43-year-old man from Minneapolis, was fatally shot on May 27 by the owner of the Cadillac Pawn & Jewelry shop who believed he was burglarizing his business. Oscar Lee Stewart Jr., a 30-year-old man from Burnsville, Minnesota, died from smoke inhalation and burn injuries from an intentional building fire at the Max It Pawn store in Minneapolis on May 28. No one faced homicide charges in connection to either man's death—Horton's killing was deemed self defense and Steward's death accidental.

Officials had trouble identifying the people responsible for causing destruction as the peaceful protests transitioned to riots. Law enforcement recovered incendiaries, weapons, and stolen vehicles left in the areas of heated protests. The Bureau of Alcohol, Tobacco, Firearms and Explosives investigated 164 structure fires due to arson in the Twin Cities in the days after Floyd's murder—the total did not reflect individual acts of arson and did not include adjacent structures were damaged by large fires. The multi-agency law enforcement command center for the Twin Cities announced that 604 protesters had been arrested as of June 2, 2020. Several hundred of those arrested were described as participating in peaceful protests, but were taken into custody at night for violating curfew. People charged with violating curfew faced potential fines of up to $1,000 or 90 days in jail, but charges against many who protested peacefully were later dropped.

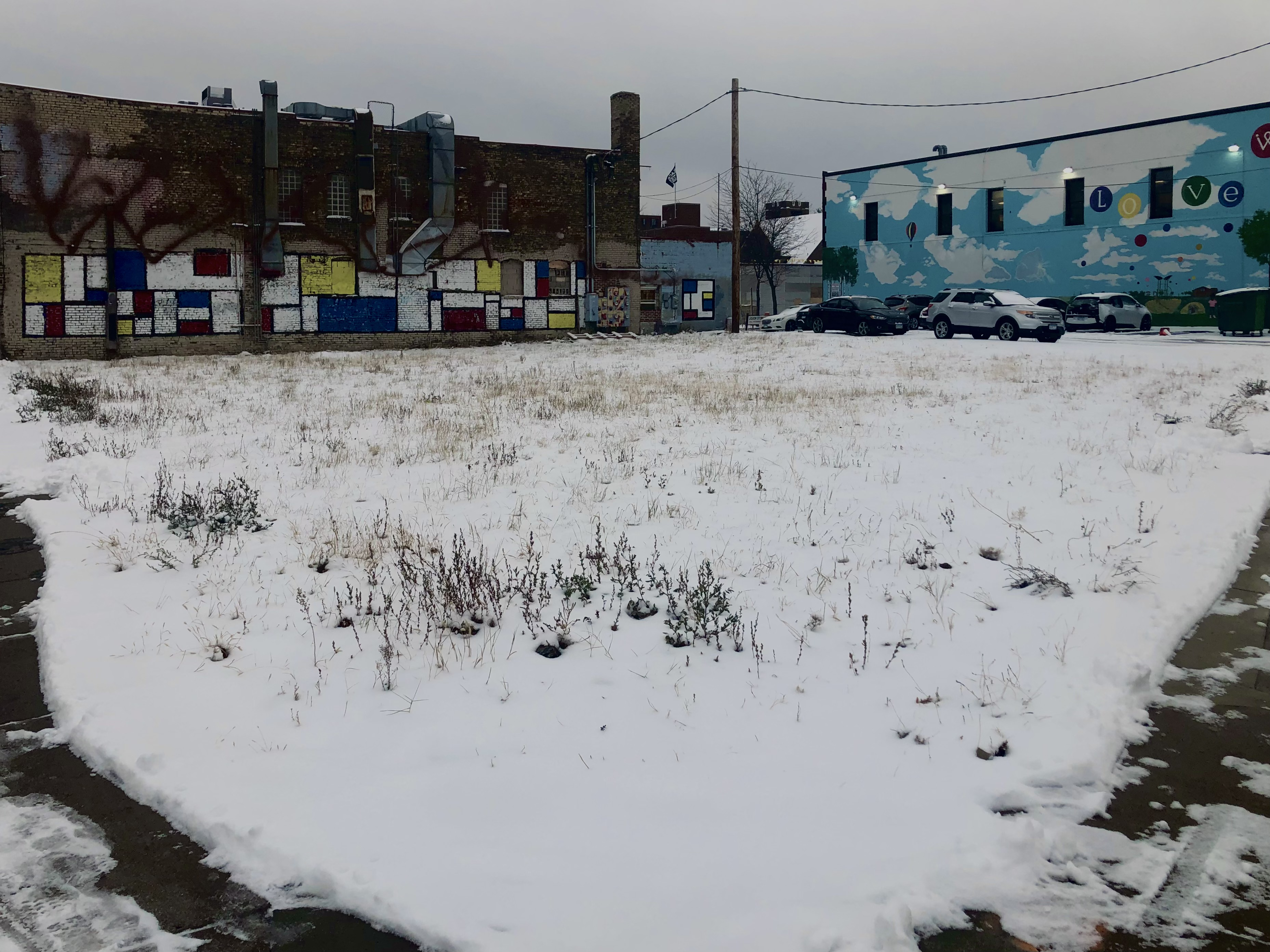
The vacant lot formerly occupied by Minnehaha Liquors, November 14, 2022.

By a year after the unrest, federal officials had charged 17 people for rioting or arson-related crimes and local officials had charged 81 with felonies connected to the unrest. More than half of those charged were described as white Americans who travelled from suburban or rural communities to participate in the unrest, with some motivated to address racial injustice. The driver of the tanker truck during the I-35W protest march on May 31, 2020, was initially charged with criminal vehicular operation, but the charges were dismissed and the driver asserted he did not drive into the protest intentionally.

Jaleel Stallings, who had fired gunshots towards an unmarked vehicle containing police officers on May 30, 2020, was acquitted at trial of an attempted murder charges in 2021 after successfully argued his actions were self defense. Justin Stetson, a former Minneapolis police officer, was charged in late 2022 with third-degree assault for allegedly striking Stallings after he was unarmed and had surrendered. Stallings and several others settled police misconduct lawsuits with the City of Minneapolis in the aftermath of the unrest. Stetson pleaded guilty on May 10, 2023, to third-degree assault and one count of misconduct as a public officer in order to avoid jail time, with the condition he never work as a police officer in Minnesota again.

The events became topic of local and national political debate in the years afterwards. The terminology used to characterize what happened in Minneapolis—"the riots" or "the uprising"—reflected growing political polarization in the United States at the time of Floyd's murder, and implied deeper motives for violent actors during the unrest . Analysis of state and federal criminal charges, however, found that disorganized crowds had no single goal or affiliation, many opportunist crowds amassed spontaneously during periods of lawlessness, and that people causing destruction had contradictory motives for their actions.

Rebuilding efforts were hindered by rising costs and bureaucratic obstacles. By 2025, 48 destroyed Minneapolis properties were still vacant lots and damaged buildings remained along Lake Street and other business corridors.

==== Maps ====
Major areas of civic unrest in Minneapolis and Saint Paul, May 27–29, 2020:

East Lake Street in Minneapolis

University Avenue West, in Saint Paul

Nicollet Avenue in Minneapolis

==== Videos ====
Scenes of protests and looting in Minneapolis, May 28, 2020

Scenes of fires and destruction in Minneapolis, May 29, 2020

== Subsequent events ==
=== George Floyd Square ===
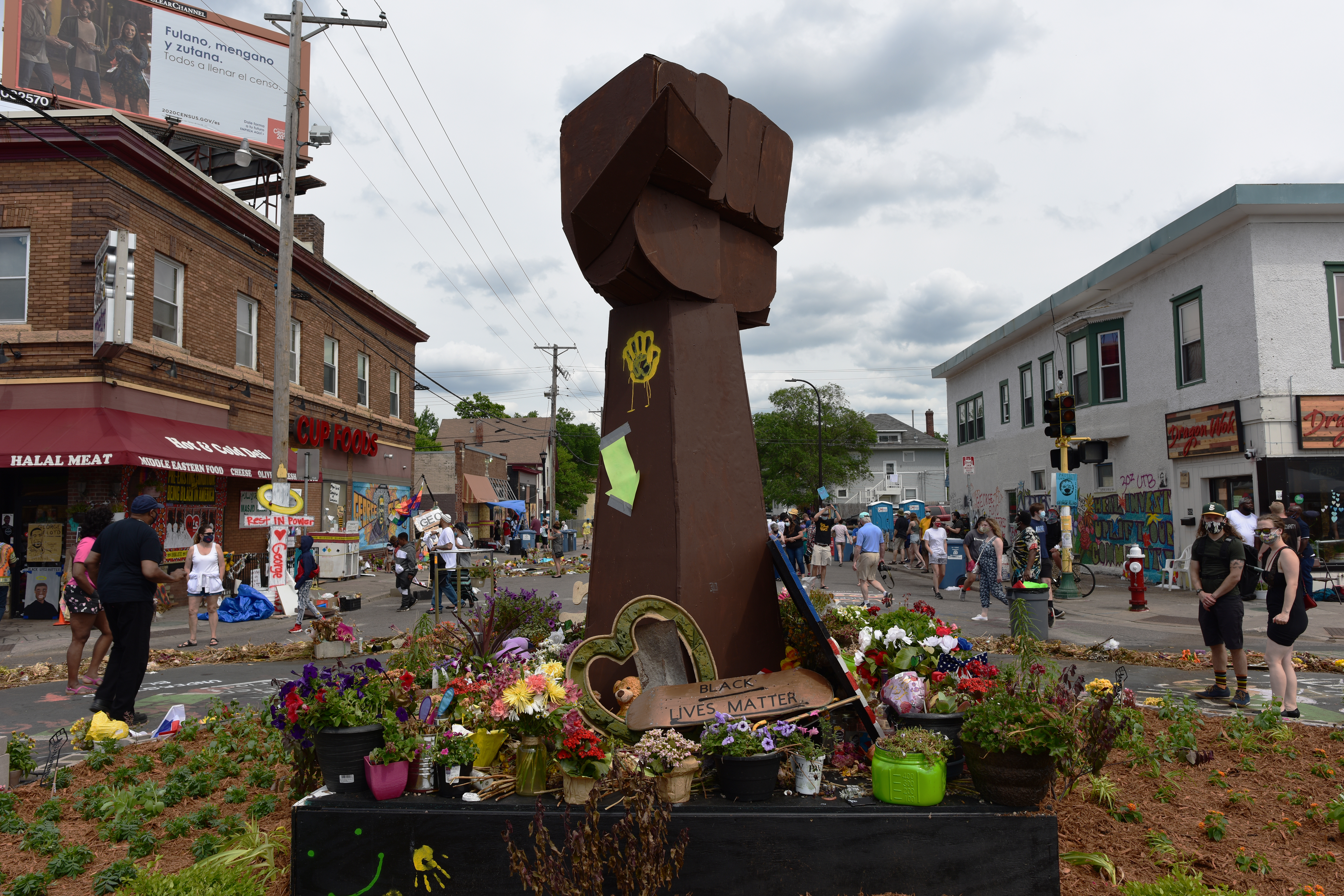
Fist sculpture at George Floyd Square, June 19, 2020

George Floyd protests first emerged on May 26, 2020, at the East 38th Street and Chicago Avenue intersection where he was murdered the day prior. Residents and activists transformed the street intersection into a memorial site with public art of Floyd and of other racial justice themes. Some activists also held several blocks around the intersection in an occupation protest. The memorial site and occupation of the area was referred to as George Floyd Square and it became a "continuous site of protest" and thousands of people from multiple countries visited it. City crews removed cement barricades at the intersection on June 3, 2021, as part of a phased reopening process and vehicular traffic resumed several weeks later on June 20, 2021. The controversial protest movement at George Floyd Square persisted after the city's streetway reopening process into 2023.

=== Racial injustice and other police killings ===
After the initial wave of unrest, protesters continued to seek justice for Floyd and made broader calls to address structural racism in Minnesota, with many protest events part of the larger Black Lives Matter movement. National Public Radio described the protest period in the months after Floyd's murder as the "summer of racial reckoning". A columnist for The European Conservative referred to it as "the long hot summer of 2020", a nod to the long, hot summer of 1967. Law enforcement killings resulted in protests and intermittent civil disorder throughout 2020, 2021, and 2022. Protests also led to a local police abolition movement. A political campaign to amend the Minneapolis city's charter to replace the police department with a Department of Public Safety continued in 2020 and 2021, but the City Question 2 ballot initiate was ultimate rejected by voters.

=== Criminal trial of Derek Chauvin ===
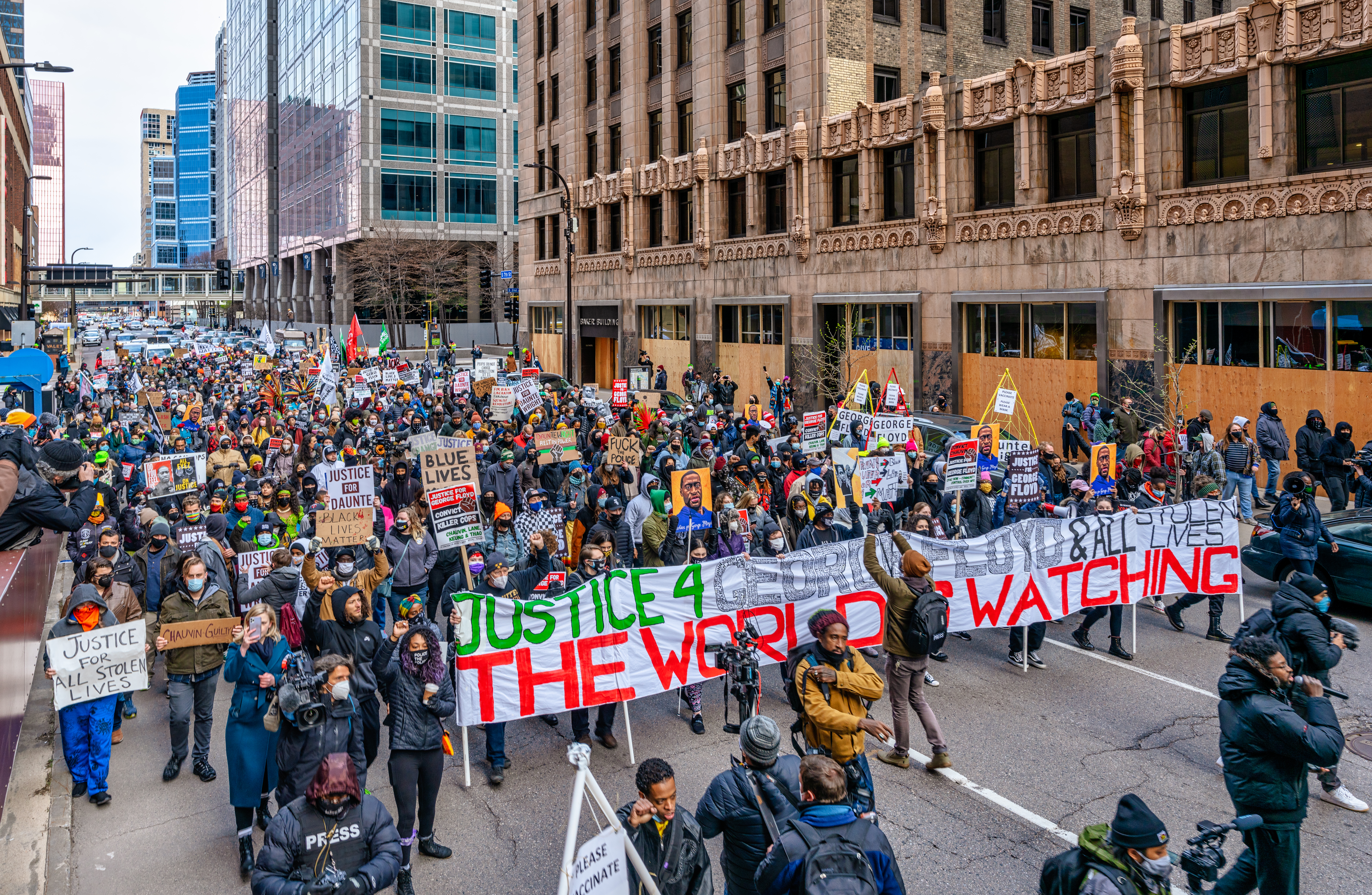
Protest march in Minneapolis, April 19, 2021

In 2020 and 2021, several protests were held in Minneapolis that coincided with judicial proceedings and the criminal trial of Derek Chauvin. Local government officials surrounded the Hennepin County Government Center, a downtown Minneapolis courthouse and local government office building, that was the venue for the proceedings with a temporary concrete barrier, metal fencing, and barbed wire in anticipation of civil disorder. Demonstrations grew in size during Chauvin's criminal trial that commenced on March 8, 2021, and concluded on April 19, 2021. The court announced a guilty verdict on April 20, 2021, and several marches and rallies took place afterwards.

Some activists in Minneapolis who were compelled to action by Floyd's murder stated that Chauvin's guilty verdict in April 2021 would not be the end their protest movement. Protests at the conclusion Chauvin's criminal case featured chants of the mantra, "One down, three to go". Alexander, Lane, and Thao—the other three officers at the scene of Floyd's murder—awaited a federal civil rights trial in and a state criminal trial for aiding and abetting murder and manslaughter. Activists believed that justice over Floyd's murder included holding all four officers legally accountable, as well as having policy makers address what they perceived as systemic racism in policing.

Several activists pledged to continue protesting until the conclusion of the criminal trials and the civil case against the police officers at the scene of Floyd's murder.

=== First-year anniversary events ===
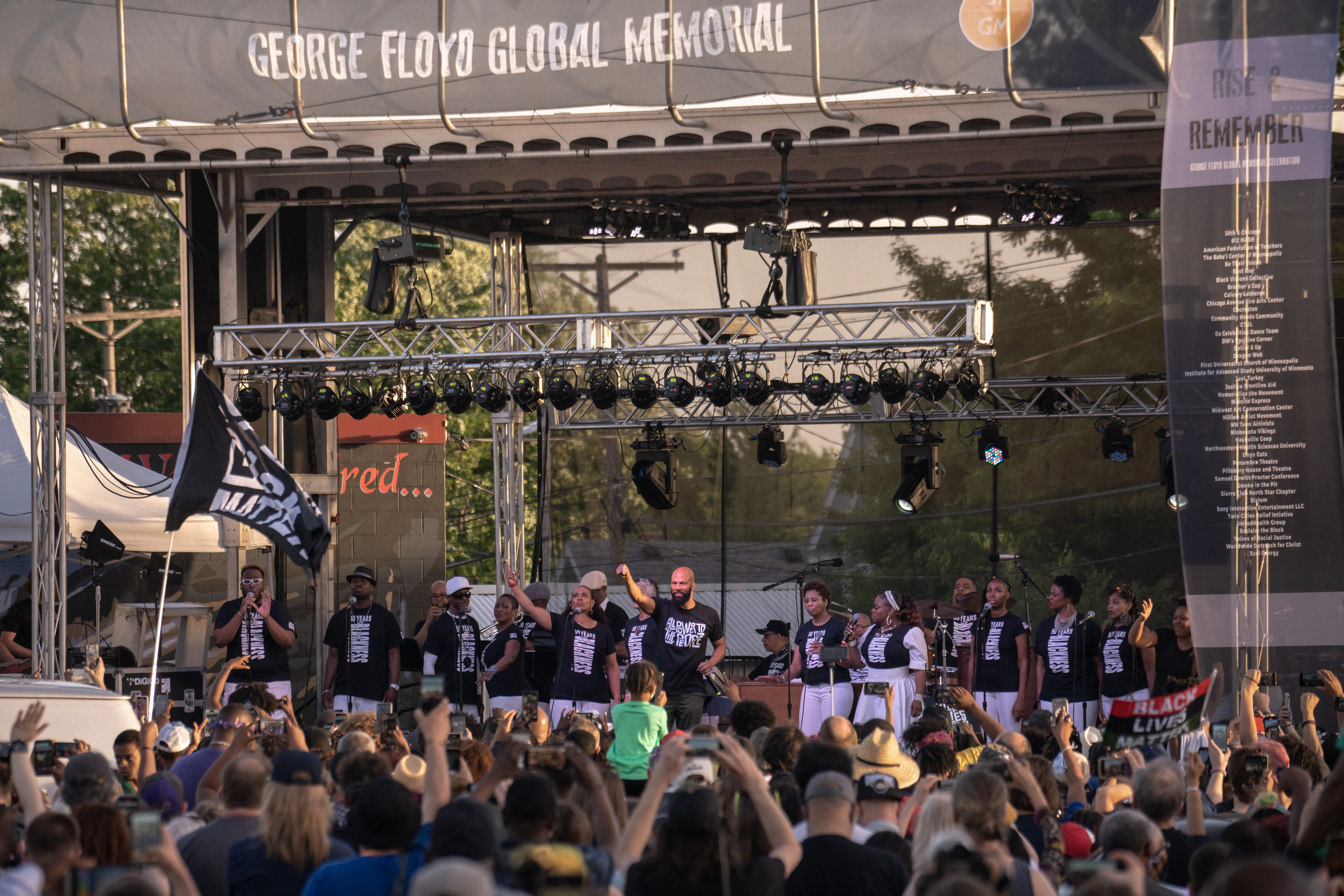
Concert for George Floyd in Minneapolis, May 25, 2021

Several events were held in conjunction with the one-year anniversary of Floyd's murder. The George Floyd Memorial Foundation, a non-profit organization founded by Floyd's family, planned marches and rallies in Minneapolis, New York, and Houston for May 23, 2021, and called for two days of virtual activism everywhere in the United States in support of federal police reform legislation.

On May 23, 2021, the Floyd family and civil rights activists led a rally in downtown Minneapolis outside the Hennepin County Government Center building, which was still fortified by fencing installed for the Chauvin trial that concluded a month earlier. Bridgett Floyd, who was George's sister, Al Sharpton, Floyd family attorney Benjamin Crump were among those who spoke to the crowd of several hundred people. Activists who spoke hoped that Floyd's murder, which had been a catalyst for changing policing policies in the United States, would result in passage of police reform legislation and examination of other officer-involved killings. U.S. senators Amy Klobuchar and Tina Smith, Minnesota governor Tim Walz, Minnesota lieutenant governor Peggy Flanagan, Minneapolis mayor Jacob Frey, and Saint Paul mayor Melvin Carter attended the events. A crowd marched through downtown Minneapolis after the rally.

On May 25, 2021, downtown Minneapolis hosted a "George Floyd Inaugural Remembrance: Celebration Of Life" concert, and several events were held at the East 38th and Chicago Avenue street intersection where he was killed. Minnesota governor Tim Walz declared a statewide moment of silence for 9 minutes and 29 seconds, the length of time Chauvin knelt on Floyd, for 1:00 p.m. Walz said, "George Floyd's murder ignited a global movement and awakened many Minnesotans and people around the world to the systemic racism that our Black communities, Indigenous communities, and communities of color have known for centuries".

=== Civil rights trial of Kueng, Lane, and Thao ===
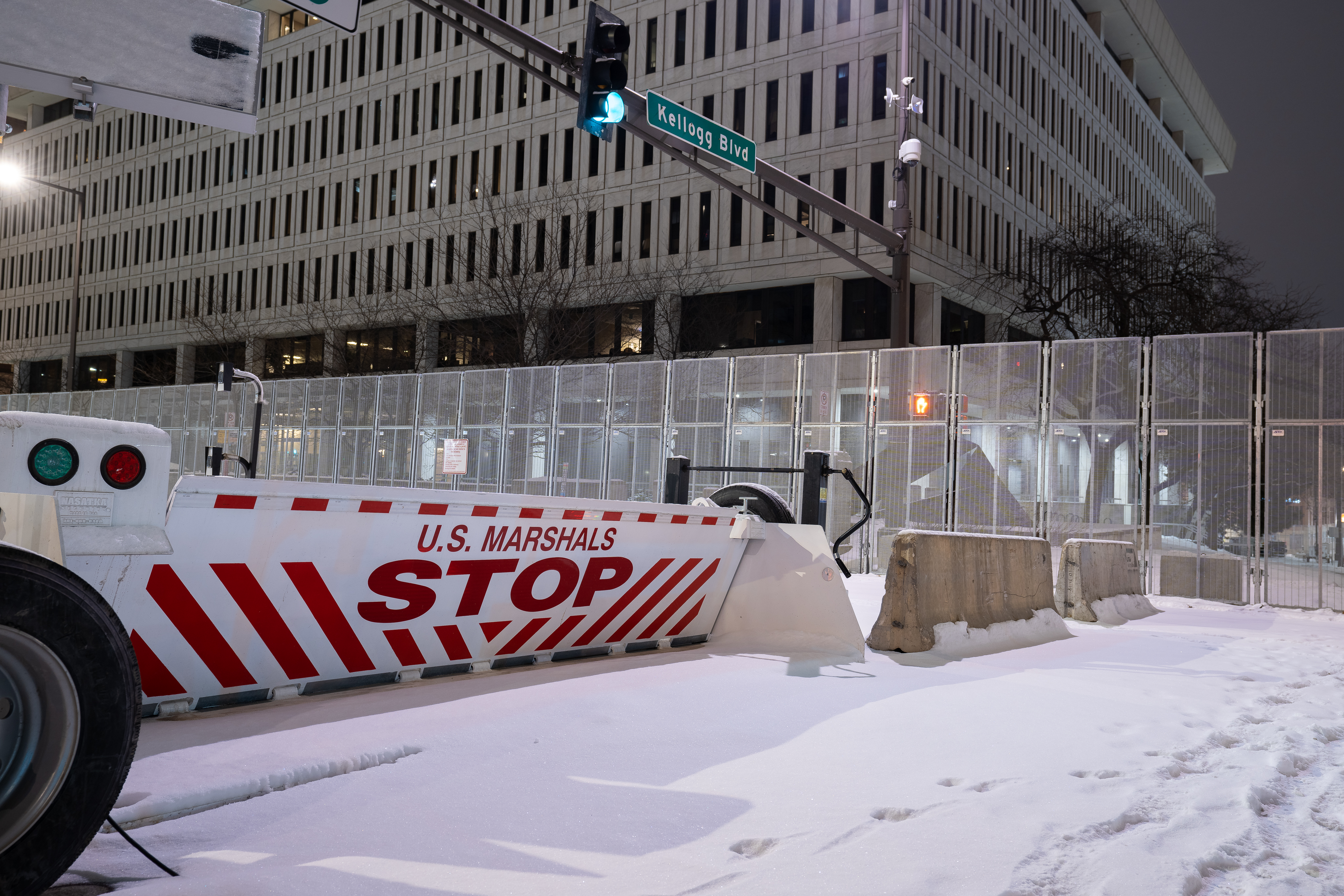
Security fencing at the Warren E. Burger Federal Building, January 23, 2022

In early 2022, local officials prepared counter-protest measures and for potential unrest ahead of the January 20 schedule start of the federal civil rights trial of Kueng, Lane, and Thao. Officials erected security fencing around the Warren E. Burger Federal Building in Saint Paul, Minnesota, that contained the courtroom for the trial. Protest demonstrations were held in the streets surrounding the courtroom building during the trial. On February 24, 2022, Kueng, Lane, and Thao were convicted on all federal civil rights charges they faced at trial. A small group of protesters gathered outside the court building in Saint Paul and at the location in Minneapolis where Floyd was murdered while the verdict was read.

=== Second-year anniversary events ===
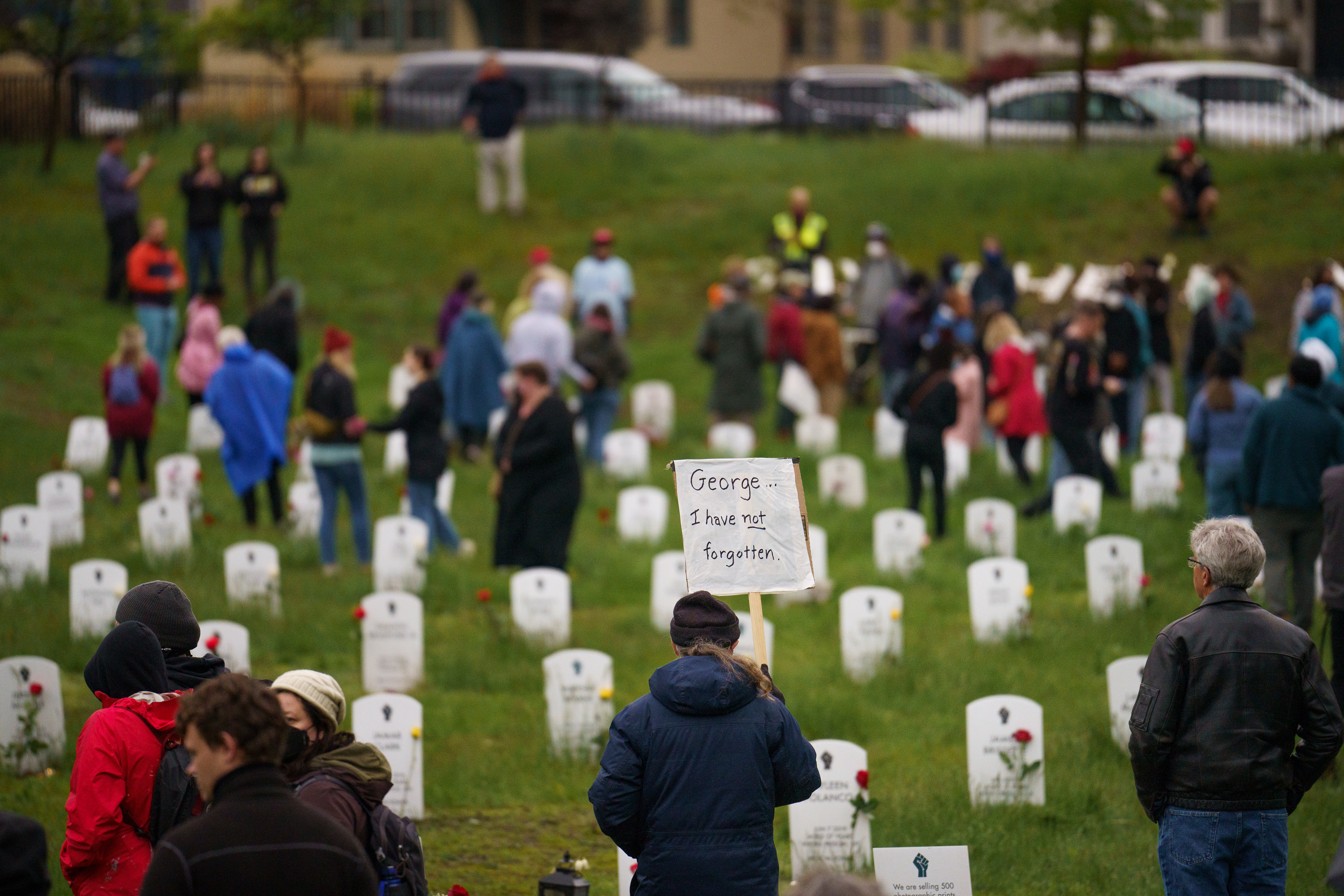
A gathering at "Say Their Names Cemetery", May 25, 2022

Several events in Minneapolis were held in conjunction with the second anniversary of Floyd's murder on May 25, 2022. The events, referred to as the Day of Racial Reckoning Assembly, promoted racial justice and healing. At George Floyd Square in Minneapolis, city officials unveiled a commemorative "George Perry Floyd Square" street sign. In the evening, about three dozen protesters gathered outside the Minnesota governor's residence in Saint Paul to demand police reform and systemic change. A group of demonstrators marched on East Lake Street in Minneapolis on May 28, 2022, to mark the second anniversary of the burning of the city's third police precinct building. Demonstrators lit off fireworks, spray painted graffiti messages, and set several shopping carts on fire.

=== Criminal proceedings for Lane, Kueng, and Thao ===
On May 18, 2022, Lane pleaded guilty to the charge of aiding and abetting manslaughter, in exchange for which another charge of aiding and abetting second-degree murder was dismissed. He thus avoided a trial.

Jury selection for the state criminal trial of Kueng and Thao was scheduled to begin on October 24, 2022. Unlike Chauvin's criminal trial and the civil rights trial of the other three officers at the scene of Floyd's death, the proceedings were not live-streamed, and officials did not surround the courtroom building with barbed-wire fencing or National Guard troops. A few hours before the proceedings were to begin, Kueng pleaded guilty to the criminal state charges of aiding and abetting manslaughter with a recommendation of 42 months in prison. Thao waived his right to a jury trial, instead choosing a trial by stipulated evidence in which the judge would review the evidence and issue a verdict. On May 2, 2023, Thao was found guilty of aiding and abetting manslaughter. The conviction fulfilled a key demand of protesters: that all four Minneapolis police officers be held legally accountable for murdering George Floyd.

== See also ==
- 2020–2023 United States racial unrest
- 2020 Minneapolis homeless encampments
- George Floyd protests in Minnesota
- History of Minneapolis
- List of civil unrest in Minneapolis–Saint Paul
- Police brutality in the United States
