= Liz Lee =

Liz Lee may refer to:

- Liz Lee (politician), a state representative from Minnesota
- Liz Lee, a character in the My Life as Liz television series

== See also ==
- Elizabeth Lee (disambiguation)
- Lee (disambiguation) § Names
- Liz, a given name
