= Killing of Jamar Clark =

2015 killing of a Black man by Minneapolis Police

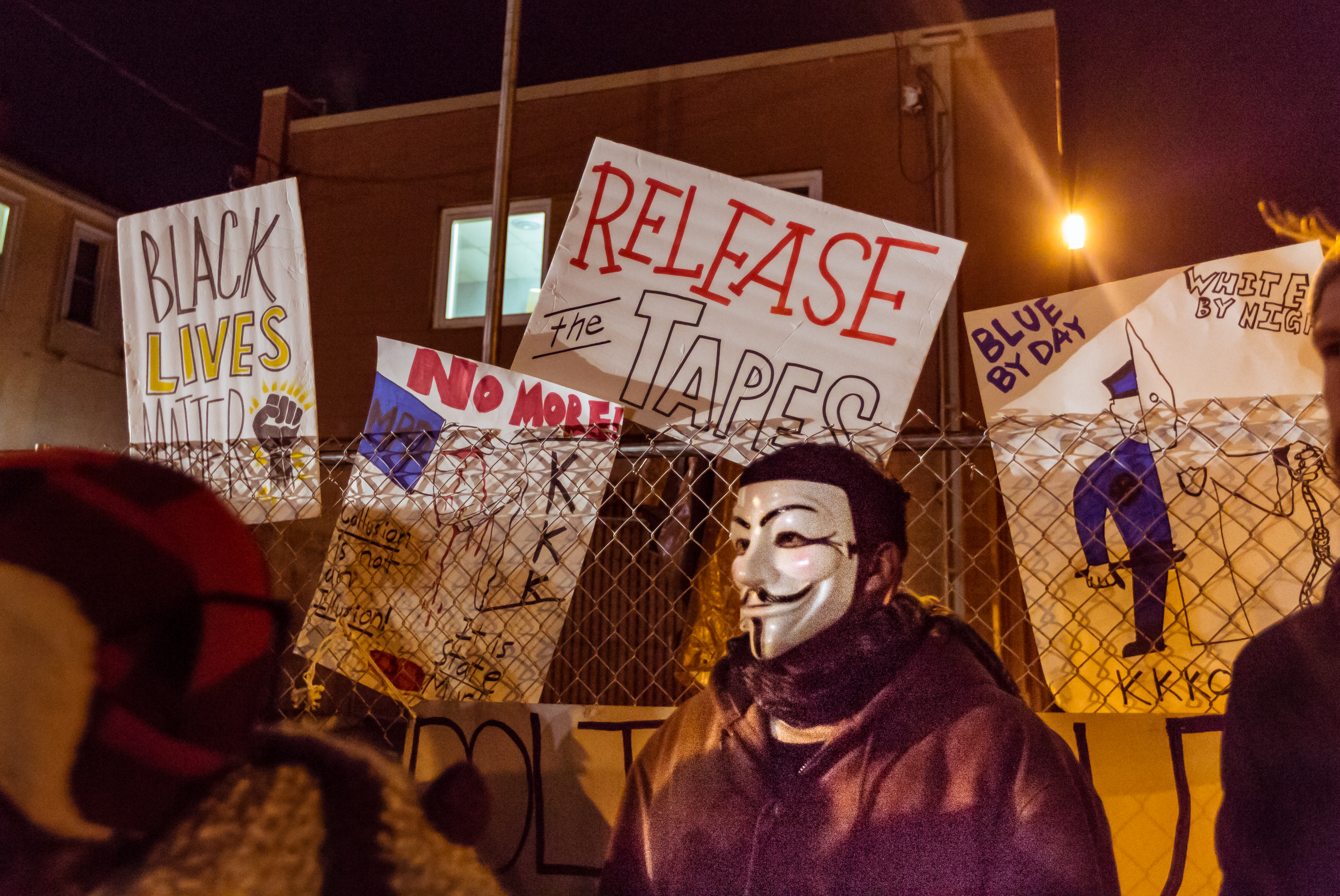
- Community members gather outside the offices of the Police Officers Federation of Minneapolis, the Minneapolis Police Department's union on December 3, 2015.
- Date: November 15, 2015
- Time: 12:45 am
- Location: 1600 Plymouth Avenue North, Minneapolis, Minnesota, United States; 44°59′29.3″N 93°18′06.7″W
- Type: Shooting
- Participants: Mark Ringgenberg; Dustin Schwarze
- Outcome: No charges filed $200,000 civil settlement granted to Clark's family
- Deaths: Jamar Clark

On November 15, 2015, two police officers fatally shot Jamar Clark, a 24-year-old African-American man, in Minneapolis. The two shooters were Mark Ringgenberg and Dustin Schwarze. They were a part of the Minneapolis Police Department which subsequently placed the men on paid administrative leave. The night after Ringgenberg and Schwarze shot him, Clark died at the Hennepin County Medical Center after being taken off life support. His death resulted from one of the gunshot wounds the shooters inflicted on November 15.

In response to the shooting, Black Lives Matter organized protests outside the Fourth Precinct police station that lasted for 18 days, as well as other protests and demonstrations in and around Minneapolis. Hennepin County Attorney Mike Freeman announced that cases concerning officer-involved shootings would no longer be put before grand juries, but instead his office would make the decision to file criminal charges. On March 30, 2016, Freeman announced that no charges would be filed against Ringgenberg and Schwarze. Freeman concluded that the officers acted in accordance with Minnesota Statutes authorizing deadly force and that the state would be unable to provide evidence that the officer's use of force was unlawful.

In 2019, Clark's family agreed to a $200,000 civil settlement which was approved by city council.

== Jamar Clark ==
Jamar Clark (May 3, 1991 – November 16, 2015) was adopted by Wilma and James Clark when he was four. His family stated that he had a close relationship with his biological and adoptive parents and his 14 siblings. Clark had endured a difficult childhood and had a criminal record, but was making attempts to turn his life around, according to friends and family. At the time of the shooting, he was employed by Tim Hoag at Copeland Trucking and had hopes of attending college, although he never enrolled.

Clark had previous encounters with law enforcement, beginning in 2010 when he received a felony conviction for first-degree aggravated robbery. The conviction resulted in a sentence of 41 months in prison, of which it is unclear how many Clark served. Clark faced a second conviction for terroristic threats after he threatened to burn down the apartment of an ex-girlfriend in March 2015, following a bitter breakup. According to Kyle Potter of the Associated Press, "He threw a brick through his ex-girlfriend's window and threatened to burn her apartment unit down -- leaving behind a trail of lighter fluid to prove it, according to court documents." As of November 2015, he was on probation for this crime. Potter wrote that Clark's ex-girlfriend described him as "a nurturing, loving man who was drawn to her four children, giving them advice and helping them sell candy for school", but that she also said that their relationship soured in recent times, resulting in their breakup. A Domestic Abuse No Contact Order was issued for Clark, requiring him to stay away from the ex-girlfriend until 2020. Additionally, Clark was awaiting trial for a high-speed chase arrest from July 2015.

== Shooting ==
Jamar Clark was attending the birthday party of Nekelia Sharp, who was hosting the event at her apartment on the 1600 block of Plymouth Avenue North in Minneapolis. Sharp and her husband engaged in a dispute and Clark's girlfriend grabbed Sharp, after which Sharp and Clark's girlfriend fought. Clark stepped in to pull his girlfriend away and, according to Sharp, Clark's girlfriend hit him. The pair left and soon, someone called for help and paramedics were called. Sharp let them into her apartment and they escorted Clark's girlfriend to the ambulance, which Clark approached after she had entered it. An onlooker reported that both the paramedics and police who had arrived at the scene asked Clark to step away from the ambulance and that police then stepped out of their car, arrested Clark on the ground, and the EMS supervisor placed a knee on Clark's chest, after which he was shot.

County Attorney accounts say that Clark got into a confrontation with paramedics and then when police officers responded at 12:45 a.m., a struggle ensued, Clark obtained the officer's gun, leading to the shooting by the other officer. Hennepin County Attorney Mike Freeman said that Clark was resisting and was not handcuffed. In a statement on November 16, police chief Janeé Harteau said that the Minneapolis Police Department's preliminary information was that Clark was not restrained with handcuffs when shot. An autopsy report, released on November 17, by the Hennepin County Medical Examiner concluded that Clark died from a gunshot wound to the head.

The President of the Minneapolis Police Union Bob Kroll said that Clark was actively resisting arrest and tried to take the weapon of one of the officers, and that he was not handcuffed at the moment of the shooting. Clark's DNA was found on the handle of one of the officers' gun. Mike Freeman said there was no forensic evidence on Clark's arm indicating he was handcuffed at the time of shooting. In addition, he stated that 10 law enforcement and paramedic witnesses including the officers involved said he was not handcuffed.

The United States Department of Justice declined to prosecute the officers, saying it found "insufficient evidence" for criminal civil rights charges. The federal government decision followed a separate investigation in March by Minnesota's Bureau of Criminal Apprehension (BCA), which concluded that the officers acted in self-defense and would not face criminal charges for the killing. Schwarze shot Clark only after Ringgenberg scuffled with the young man, according to the BCA findings. Clark allegedly took control of the officer's gun and Ringgenberg told Schwarze to open fire. The department's internal investigation confirmed those findings. They "concluded the use of deadly force in the line of duty was necessary to protect an officer from apparent death or great bodily harm."

Other accounts have disputed the police's version of events. Nekelia Sharp said that the shooting occurred while Clark was handcuffed and not resisting. Teto Wilson, who visited a nearby club, said he saw Clark "perfectly still, laying [sic] on the ground" when he was shot. Keisha Steele, who lived near the area of the shooting, said she saw Clark's hands behind his back. Everett Spicer arrived at the scene after the shooting, and said he saw a motionless Clark handcuffed on the ground. Spicer said police removed the handcuffs from Clark as emergency medical services arrived to tend to him. In its decision to not charge the officers, the Department of Justice said that eyewitness accounts were inconsistent. Half of the witness interviewed said that Clark was not handcuffed. Among those that said he was handcuffed at the time of the shooting, federal authorities said that witness accounts varied regarding the timing and sequence of events, and if one or both hands were cuffed.

== Political reaction ==
=== Immediate response ===
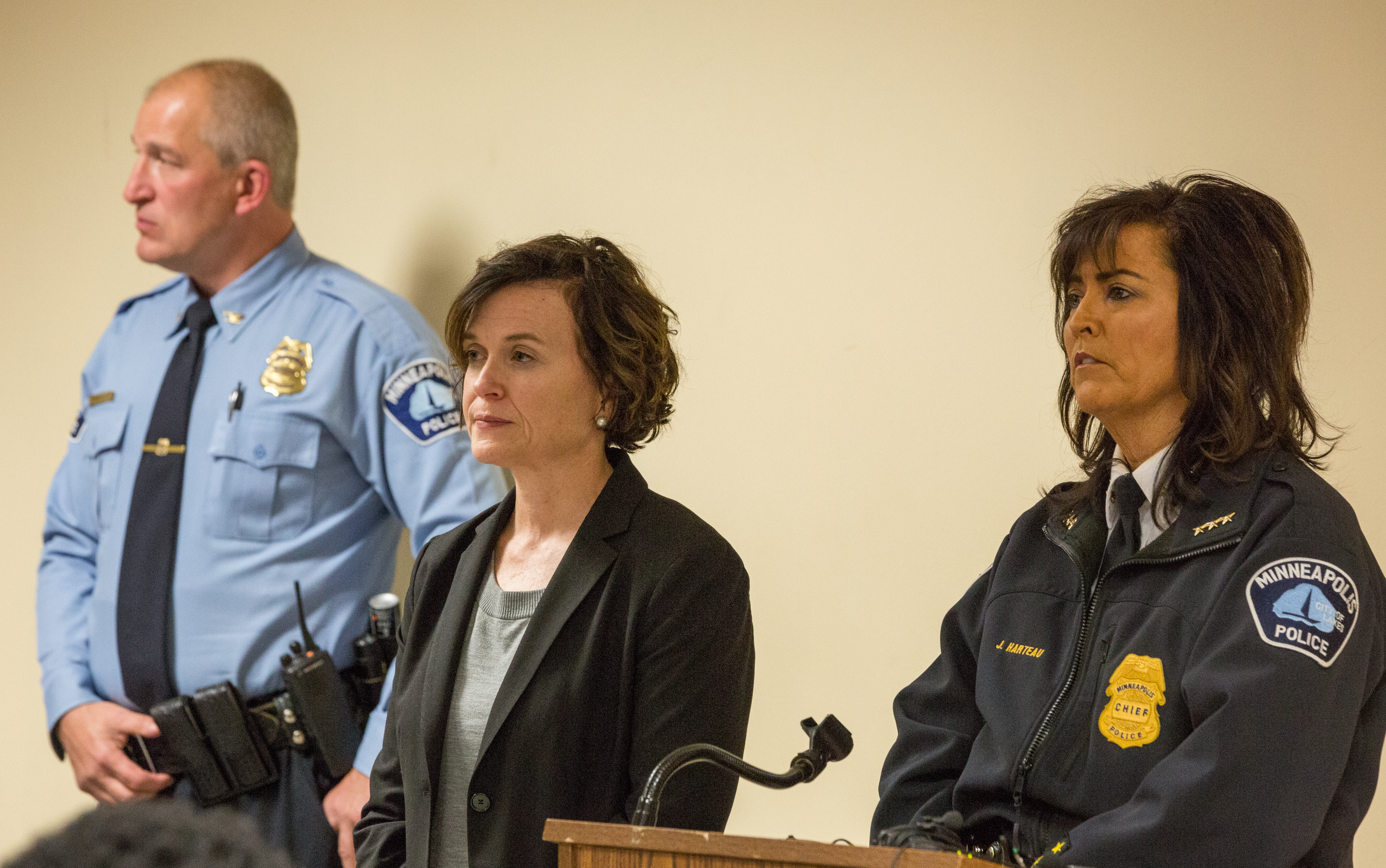
Mayor Betsy Hodges (center) and Police Chief Janeé Harteau (right) on the day of the shooting

The National Association for the Advancement of Colored People (NAACP) issued a statement condemning the shooting and demanded an independent investigation. The Police Officers Federation of Minneapolis defended the officers' actions during the shooting, adding that they had no previous disciplinary issues and pointing out a preceding incident in which an Aitkin County sheriff's deputy was disarmed and killed with his own gun.

=== Administrative leave ===
Mark Ringgenberg and Dustin Schwarze, who had been with the department for 13 months, both were subsequently placed on paid administrative leave while the investigation was conducted.

=== Local politics ===
Minneapolis Mayor Betsy Hodges stated that she contacted the Civil Rights Division of the Department of Justice and the US Attorney for Minnesota in order to an outside investigation in the "interest of transparency and community confidence." Although Minnesota's Bureau of Criminal Apprehension had already begun an investigation, Hodges indicated that Minneapolis needed "all the tools we have available to us" to investigate the shooting.

== Protests ==
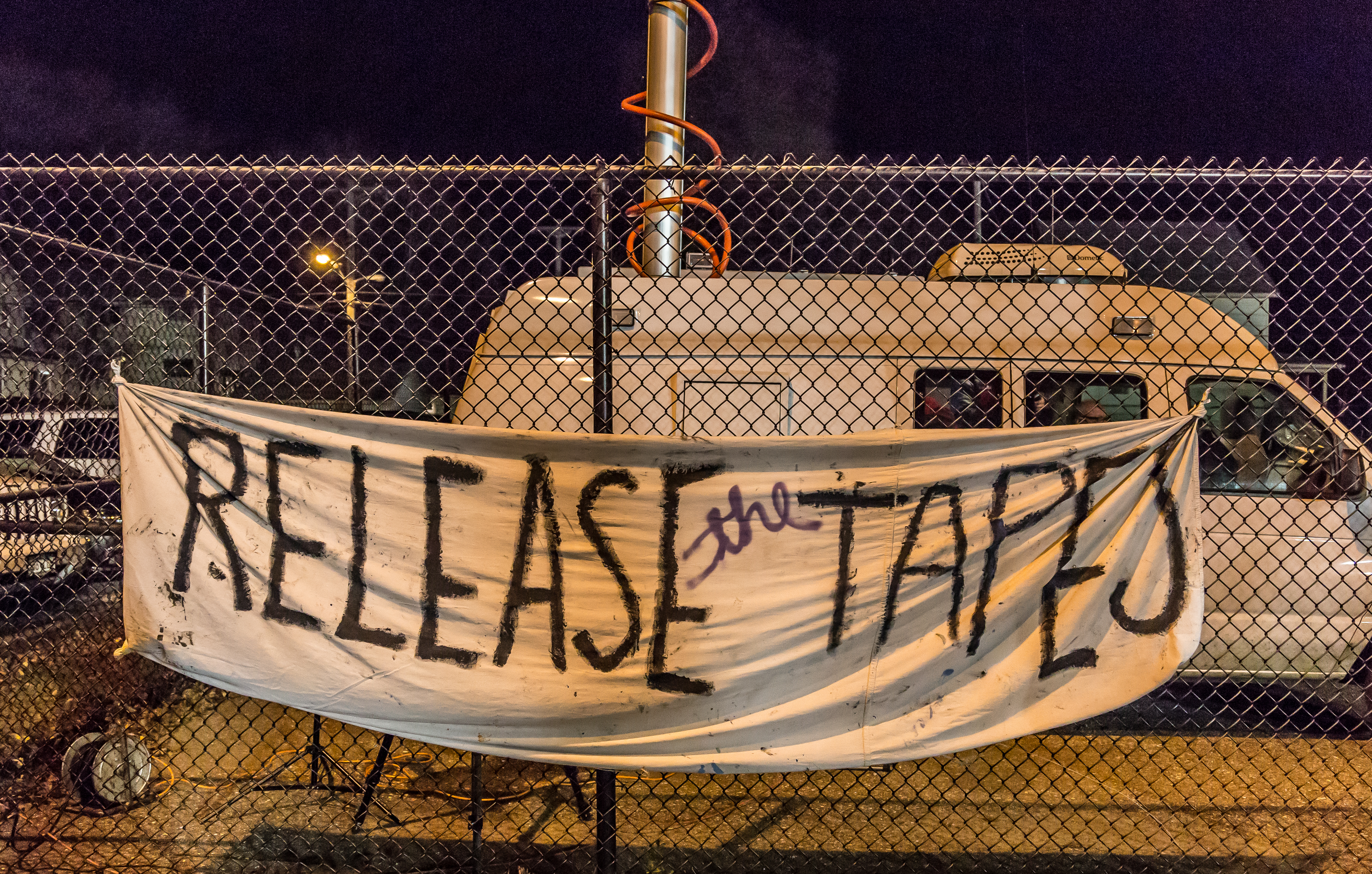
"Release the Tapes" - banner across the street from the Minneapolis Police Department's 4th Precinct during the fifth night of demonstrations following the police shooting death of Jamar Clark.

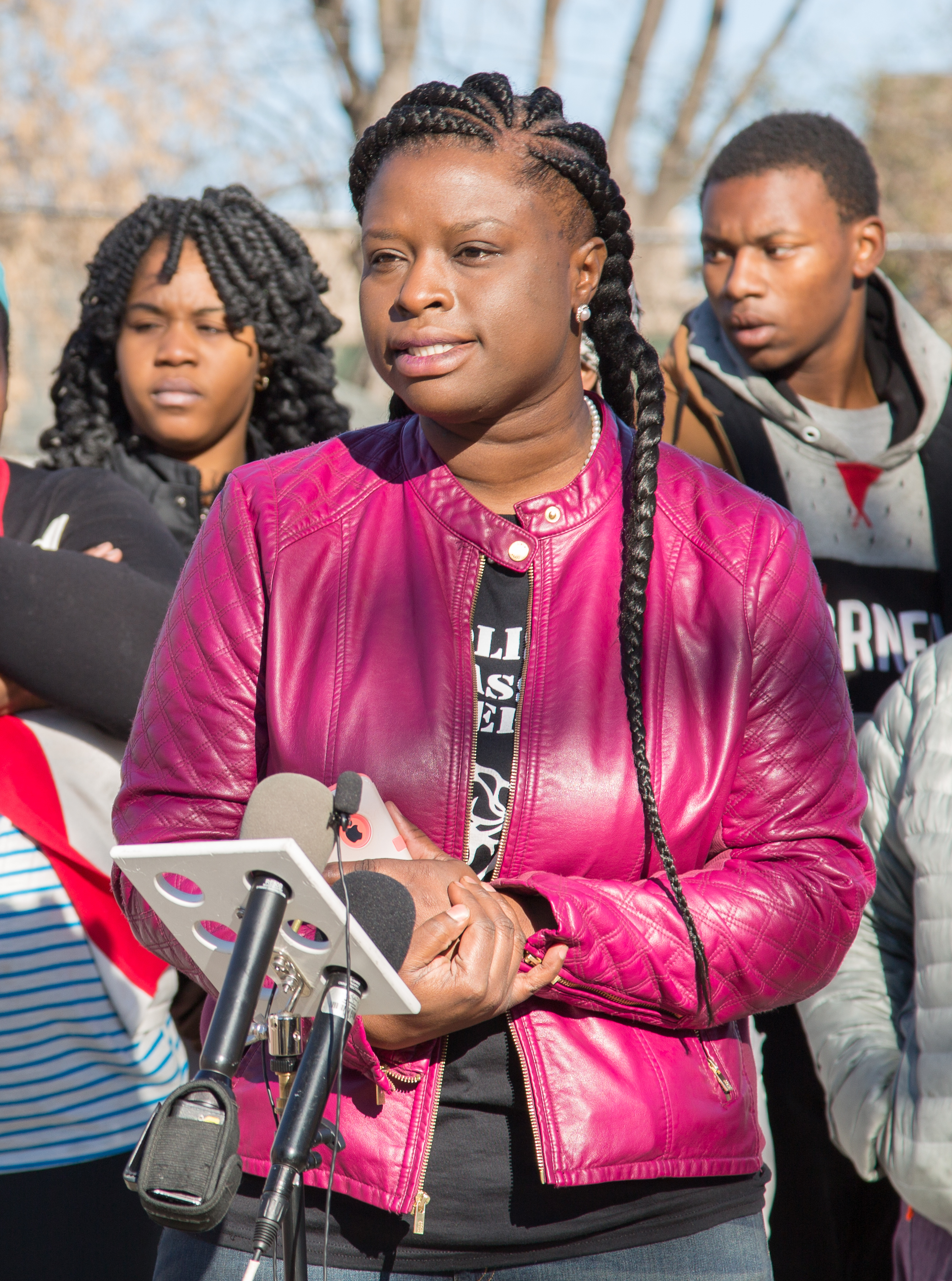
Nekima Levy-Pounds speaks during a Black Lives Matter demonstration for Clark in Minneapolis.

Black Lives Matter (BLM) activists and supporters protested for days outside the police precinct, protesting against information hiding, demanding for release of police dashcam and bodycam videos containing material evidence that can settle the truth of police accounts of the incident.

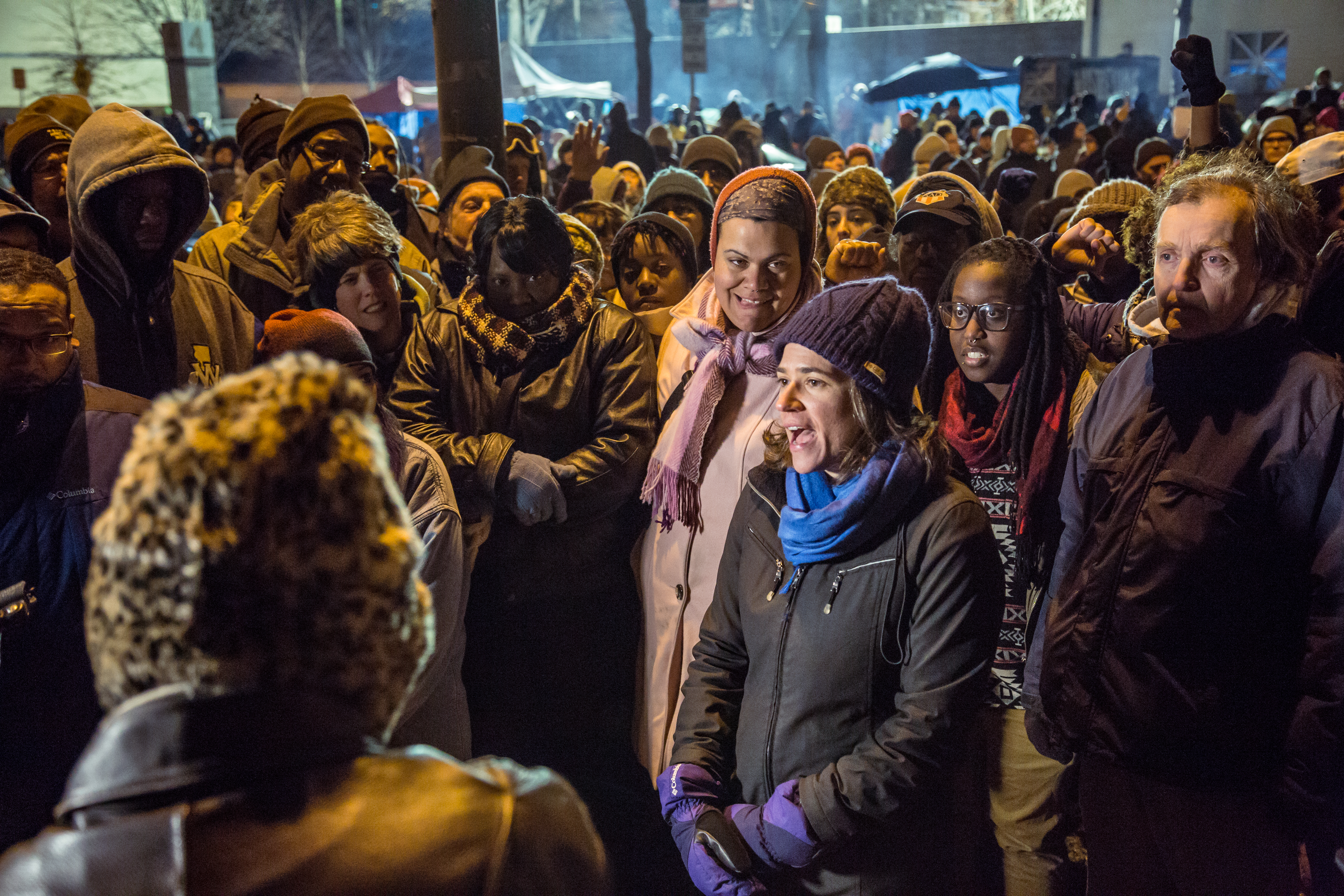
Minneapolis City Council Member Lisa Bender shares her support for peaceful demonstrators on the fifth night of protests outside the Minneapolis Police Department's 4th Precinct

=== Shooting of protesters ===
On November 23, a group of four men, three wearing masks, were asked to leave the protest. The group was chased away from the demonstration by about a dozen protesters before one turned and opened fire at around 10:45 p.m. Five male protesters were shot, but none of them suffered life-threatening injuries. One of the injured protesters later said he heard the word "nigger" being used during the incident, although he did not state who exactly said it. Shots were also overheard the following night, though no injuries were reported.

At 11:20 a.m. the next day, a 23-year-old white man was taken into custody in Bloomington. A 32-year-old Hispanic man was arrested in Minneapolis, but was later released after it was determined he was not at the scene of the shooting. At 2:30 p.m., two white men, ages 21 and 26, turned themselves in to police. Four men were charged in the shootings: Lawrence Scarsella, 23, with riot and five counts of assault (both in the second degree), and Daniel Thomas Macey, 26, Nathan Wayne Gustavsson, 21, and Joseph Martin Backman, 27, each with a charge of second-degree riot.

Several of the men in custody are believed to have posted on 4chan's /pol/ and /k/ imageboards in connection with the shooting. Days before the shooting, the suspects had released a video of them using racial slurs while preparing to bring their weapons to a protest that night.

On March 14, 2016, attorneys for the men motioned to dismiss the case based on self-defense. The motion said that the protesters wanted to "beat their asses" because they were white, part of the Ku Klux Klan, or police. Interviews with two protesters indicated that the men charged were assaulted prior to being forced from the protest at which point they were followed for a number of blocks, before the men fired upon the group. The dismissal motion also indicated that there is video evidence saying that one of the alleged gunmen raised their hands in surrender before leaving and being assaulted afterwards.

On January 24, 2017, current Burnsville Police Department and former Mankato PD officer Bret Levin, friend of Scarsella since high school, testified that he and Scarsella had exchanged "racially charged" texts, explicitly "negative about black people," on multiple occasions.

On April 26, 2017, Scarsella was sentenced to 15 years for the shooting. Charges against Macey were dismissed on February 27, 2017, as he was not with Scarsella at the time of the shooting, they were separated when pursued by protesters. On July 20, 2017, Gustavsson was sentenced to eight months in the workhouse, with credit for nearly two months of time served in jail after pleading guilty to felony second-degree riot and aiding an offender after the fact. Backman was sentenced to 90 days of house arrest for aiding an offender after the fact, the riot charge against him was dismissed for the same reason Macey's charges were stayed.

=== Removal of protest camp ===
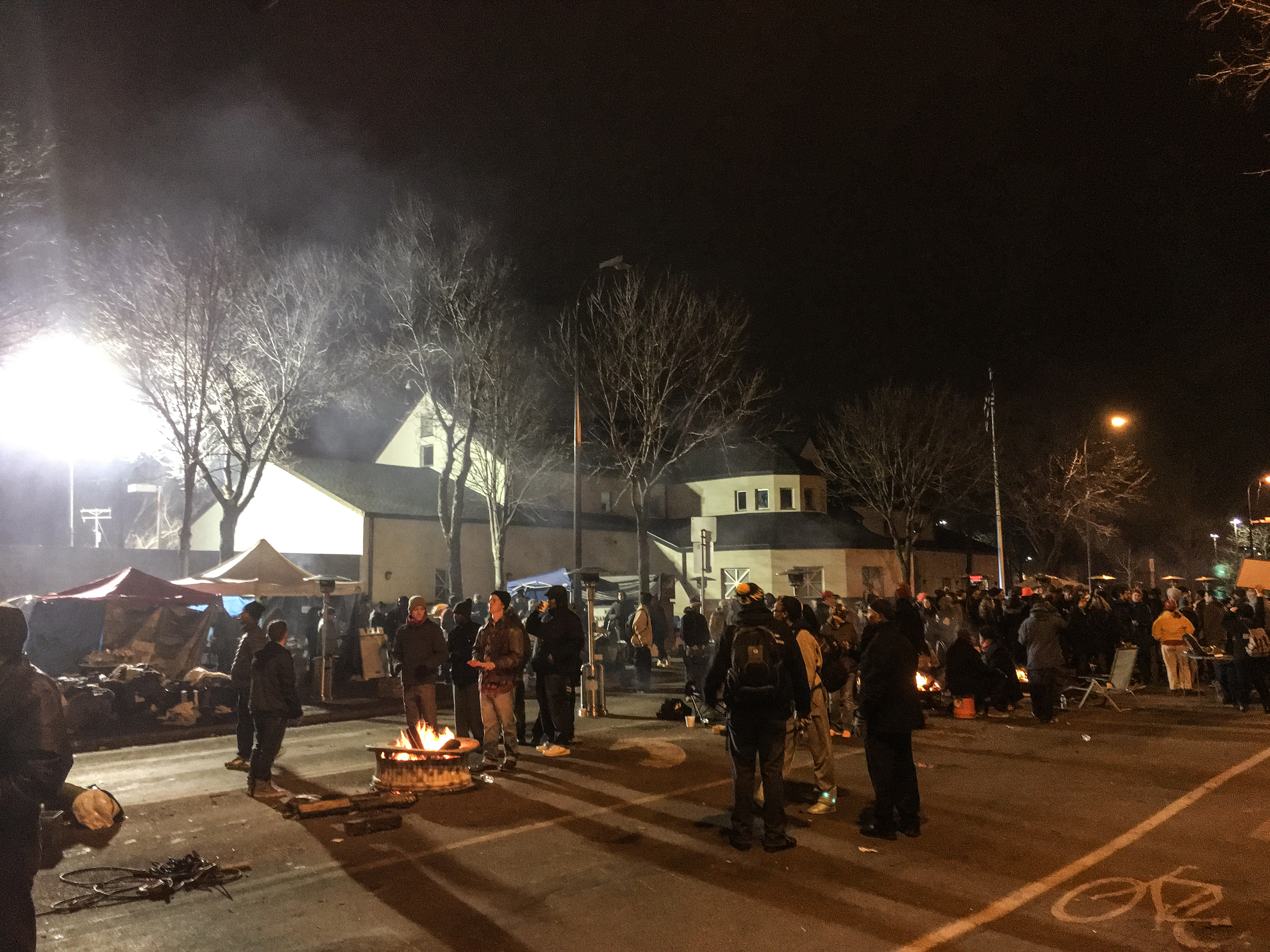
The protest camp on November 25

Protesters had camped outside of the 4th precinct for 18 days. At 4:00 a.m. on December 3, police arrived and handed out fliers stating protesters had ten minutes to leave. Later police began removing the encampments and most of the protesters left. Eight protesters who refused to leave were placed under arrest.

=== Subsequent protests ===
Black Lives Matter staged a December 23 protest of Clark's death at the Mall of America in Bloomington, a year after a similar protest in December 2014. The Mall sought to block the 2015 demonstrations, resulting in three of the protest's organizers being legally barred from entering the space. Protesters marched from the mall then took Metro Transit trains to the Terminal 2 station of the Minneapolis–Saint Paul International Airport where they were blocked by police and Terminal 2 security checkpoints were closed. Other protesters drove to Terminal 1 and blocked incoming airport traffic on Minnesota State Highway 5. A total 13 demonstrators were arrested.

Another protest was conducted on January 18, 2016 (Martin Luther King, Jr. Day), with demonstrators against the deaths of Clark and Marcus Golden (a man who Saint Paul police had killed a year prior) blocking the Lake Street-Marshall Bridge for a short time. Protesters insisted that a special prosecutor should hear Clark's case, instead of a grand jury convening to decide whether Clark's shooting was justified.

During events of the 2020–2021 Minneapolis–Saint Paul racial unrest, Clark's name was featured in protests alongside other Black men who were killed by police. Protests in Clark's name were still being held in Minneapolis at least seven years after his death.

== Legal actions and settlement ==
In February 2016, per the requests of local officials, the U.S. Department of Justice's Community Oriented Policing Services office announced that they would be conducting a review of the way the city handled the November protests. On March 16, Mike Freeman, Hennepin County Attorney, announced that his office would cease the use of grand juries in shootings involving police officers. Freeman announced this because he believed that the use of a grand jury would not provide a transparent and fair trial (Lissargue, Jennie). The announcement was met with approval from activists and described by the Star Tribune as a "rare move" with potential ramifications throughout the country. Later in March, in preparation for Freeman's office's announcement about whether they would be pursuing charges against Ringgenberg and Schwarze, Harteau released a video warning against "violence or disruption" based on Freeman's actions. On March 30, Freeman announced that no charges against the officers would be filed. The officers were not charged because the county was not able to prove that beyond a reasonable doubt that the officers that were involved in the shooting, shot Jamar Clark unjustifiably, as stated in Minnesota Statutes, section 609.066.

On June 13, 2019, Schwartze was removed as a plaintiff in a civil lawsuit filed by Clark's family. In August 2019, Attorneys for Clark's family confirmed that the family accepted a $200,000 settlement. This settlement sum was much larger than previous five-figures settlement proposal which city leaders offered in May 2019. The settlement went into effect after being approved by the Minneapolis City Council on August 23, 2019.

== See also ==
- List of unarmed African Americans killed by law enforcement officers in the United States
- List of killings by law enforcement officers in Minnesota
- List of incidents of civil unrest in Minneapolis–Saint Paul
