= Spike Moss =

Spike Moss may refer to:

- Spike moss or selaginella
- Spike Moss (activist)
