= Jim Farrell =

American politician

Member of the Minnesota House of Representatives from the 67A district
- In office 1991–1999
- Succeeded by: Tim Mahoney

Personal details
- Born: March 1, 1960 (age 66) St. Paul, Minnesota, U.S.
- Party: Minnesota Democratic–Farmer–Labor Party
- Education: William Mitchell College of Law, University of Minnesota
- Occupation: attorney

James Patrick Farrell (born March 1, 1960) is an American politician in the state of Minnesota. He served in the Minnesota House of Representatives.
