= John Thompson (Minnesota politician) =

American politician

Member of the Minnesota House of Representatives from the 67A district
- In office January 5, 2021 – January 9, 2023
- Preceded by: Tim Mahoney
- Succeeded by: Liz Lee

Personal details
- Born: Chicago, Illinois, U.S.
- Party: Democratic
- Other political affiliations: Independent (2021–2022) (Note: Elected in 2020 as a member of the DFL, Effective September 15, 2021, Thompson served as an independent after being expelled from the DFL caucus.) (Note: However, he sought the DFL endorsement in 2022 and lost both the endorsement and the primary to Democrat Liz Lee.)

John Thompson is an American politician who served as a member of the Minnesota House of Representatives for the 67A district from 2021 to 2023. Elected in November 2020, he assumed office on January 5, 2021. Prior to seeking elected office, Thompson was an activist supporting the Black Lives Matter movement and directed a local social justice organization.

== Early life and education ==
Thompson was born in Chicago, Illinois. He attended Central State University in Wilberforce, Ohio.

== Career ==
Thompson began his career as a machinist. He later worked in the Saint Paul Public Schools for 11 years.

=== Activism ===
Thompson was a friend of Philando Castile, a black man killed during a traffic stop by a Saint Anthony police officer in 2016, and became involved in activism with the Black Lives Matter movement during the aftermath of Castile's death. He participated in several protests over issues of racial injustice. Thompson was also the director of Fight For Justice LLC, an advocacy organization in Minnesota.

On August 15, 2020, Thompson led a controversial protest outside the home of Bob Kroll, the head of the Minneapolis police officer's union, and Liz Collin, a local television journalist, in Hugo, Minnesota. Protestors beat pinatas in the likenesses of Kroll and Collin. During his speech at the protest, Thompson said "You think we give a [expletive] about burning Hugo down?" and "[Expletive] Hugo." Days later, after Thompson's behavior drew widespread criticism, Thompson released a statement which included an apology.

=== Minnesota House of Representatives ===
Thompson was elected to the Minnesota House of Representatives in November 2020 and assumed office on January 5, 2021. He represented the 67A district that encompasses northwest Saint Paul and portions of Maplewood in the Lake Phalen area.

Thompson was an outspoken member of the legislature for police reform measures during the 92nd Minnesota Legislature. He proposed a $457 million bill with the aim of "ending system racism" in Minnesota by substantially increasing state spending for education, health care, and social service programs. At the end of the legislative session in June 2020, he criticized a compromise proposal by Republican lawmakers and Minnesota Governor Tim Walz, and said that the governor should "show testicular fortitude" and not agree to what he considered a less-comprehensive change to policing and judicial systems.

The DFL caucus expelled Thompson on September 14, 2021. Despite remaining in the Minnesota state legislature, this decision resulted in Thompson being denied access to DFL party resources and the privilege of participating in DFL party meetings. A statement released by the Minnesota DFL party following the DFL caucus decision described "credible reports of abuse and misconduct, and his failure to take responsibility" as the reason for Thompson's expulsion from the caucus.

In 2022, Liz Lee, a Hmong-American resident of Saint Paul, challenged Thompson for the DFL nomination to the Minnesota House of Representatives' District 67A. Lee secured the DFL party endorsement at its March convention and defeated Thompson in the August primary with 89 percent of the vote to Thompson's 11 percent.

== Personal life ==
Thompson is married and has three children. He developed a friendship with Philando Castile in 2005 when they worked together at local schools.

In July 2025, his son Derrick was sentenced to 58 years in prison for reckless driving that killed 5 young Somali American women in a car crash in June 2023.

In 2009, Thompson was accused of indecently exposing himself to a woman and to two children, though no charges were filed. On July 21, 2021, a Hennepin County jury convicted Thompson for misdemeanor obstruction pertaining to a 2019 disturbance incident at North Memorial Hospital in Robbinsdale, Minnesota. He was given a 30-day stayed sentence to avoid jail time if he did not commit another offense and was also ordered to pay a $200 fine and $78 fee. On 13 October 2021, during a virtual court appearance, Thompson agreed to pay a $100 fine after the state of Minnesota agreed to suspend prosecuting his case for one year. If he abides by the law, the case will be dismissed.

=== Traffic stop and residency ===
In July 2021, a Saint Paul Police Department sergeant conducted a traffic stop of Thompson's vehicle for the lack of a front license plate. After presenting a Wisconsin state identification card, he was also cited for driving with a suspended license. Thompson later stated that he was racially profiled and "got a ticket for driving while black". Prior to the traffic stop, Thompson had said that he had resided in Saint Paul, Minnesota, for 18 years. On 22 July 2021, the St Paul Police Department announced that following a brief conversation with Thompson, Thompson had apologized to the police sergeant he accused of racially profiling him.

=== Domestic assault allegations ===
In the aftermath of the traffic stop incident, news media reported that three different police departments had investigated a total of five domestic assault cases from 2003 to 2011 allegedly committed by Thompson. Several state officials subsequently called on Thompson to resign from the legislature, including Governor Walz, Lt. Governor Peggy Flanagan, House Speaker Melissa Hortman, House Majority Leader Ryan Winkler, and Democratic-Farmer-Labor Party Chair Ken Martin. Thompson denied he had committed assault and said he did not intend to resign.

== See also ==
- 2020–2021 Minneapolis–Saint Paul racial unrest
