= Elizabeth Lee =

Elizabeth Lee may refer to:

- Elizabeth Blair Lee (1818–1906), wrote letters in the American Civil War to husband Samuel Philips Lee
- Elizabeth Harriet Lee, maiden name of Elizabeth Leigh Murray (1815–1892), English actress
- Elizabeth Lee (actress) (born 1963), Hong Kong TV and film actress
- Elizabeth Lee (politician) (born 1979), Australian politician and Leader of the Opposition in the Australian Capital Territory
- Elizabeth Lee (writer) (1857–1920), English biographer and translator
- Liz Lee, the main character in the TV series My Life as Liz
- Liz Lee (politician), member of the Minnesota House of Representatives

== See also ==
- Betty Lambert (Elizabeth Minnie Lee, 1933–1983), Canadian writer
- Elizabeth Lee Hazen (1885–1975), co-discoverer of nystatin
- Elizabeth Medora Leigh (1814–1849), rumoured to be Lord Byron's daughter
