= Minneapolis Police Department =

Law enforcement agency in Minneapolis, Minnesota, U.S.

- Shoulder patch

- Police shield
- Abbreviation: MPD

Agency overview
- Formed: 1867
- Preceding agency: Municipal Police
- Employees: 926
- Annual budget: $193 million (2020)

Jurisdictional structure
- Operations jurisdiction: Minneapolis, Minnesota, U.S.
- Map of Minneapolis Police Department's jurisdiction
- Area: 58.4 square miles (151 km^{2})
- Population: 428,579 (2024)
- Governing body: Minneapolis Mayor's Office
- General nature: Local civilian police

Operational structure
- Overseen by Civilian board: Minneapolis Civilian Police Review Authority Board
- Headquarters: Downtown Minneapolis City Hall
- Police officers: Nearly 600 police officers (2026)
- Civilian employees: 300 civilian employees
- Agency executive: Bill Peterson, interim Chief of Police
- Units: List: Bomb-Arson; Business Technology; Canine; Community Crime Prevention / Safety For Everyone (CCP/SAFE); Homeland Security; Internal Affairs; Investigations; Minneapolis Police Reserve; Mounted Patrol; Police Activities League (PAL); Special Events/Reserve; Special Weapons and Tactics (SWAT); Strategic Operations Unit; Traffic Enforcement and Accident Investigation; Traffic Control; Training
- Precincts: List: 1st Precinct; 2nd Precinct; 3rd Precinct; 4th Precinct; 5th Precinct

Facilities
- Stations, Substations, and Safety Centers: 9 (1 destroyed)
- Helicopters: Available from the Minnesota State Patrol

Website
- Minneapolis Police

The Minneapolis Police Department (MPD) is the primary law enforcement agency in Minneapolis, Minnesota, United States. It is also the largest police department in Minnesota. Formed in 1867, it is the second-oldest police department in Minnesota, after the Saint Paul Police Department that formed in 1854. A short-lived Board of Police Commissioners existed from 1887 to 1890.

The department is organized into four bureaus all reporting to the Assistant Chief of Police, who in turn reports to the Chief. The city is divided into five precincts with 600 sworn officers and 300 civilian employees. As of May 29, 2020, the department's 3rd precinct station was destroyed. At the city's population peak, the MPD served over 521,000 people, and today serves over 430,000 people as of the last census estimate.

MPD answers about four hundred thousand calls a year and does fifty thousand proactive stops a year. In comparison, Hennepin Emergency Medical Services answers 60,000 calls a year. Also operating in the city are the University of Minnesota Police Department, Minneapolis Park Police Department, Metro Transit Police, and the Hennepin County Sheriff's Office. The Metropolitan Airports Commission Police serves Minneapolis-Saint Paul International Airport in unincorporated Hennepin County.

After an incident in May 2020, MPD officer Derek Chauvin was charged with and later convicted for the murder of George Floyd by kneeling on his neck for approximately 9.5 minutes. The murder sparked worldwide protests against racism and police brutality, bringing considerable attention to the MPD. The MPD has explicitly refused offers for intervention training which could have prevented civilian loss of life. Bob Kroll, head of the MPD union, characterized Floyd as a "violent criminal" and called the protests a "terrorist movement". In June 2020, President Lisa Bender of the Minneapolis City Council stated that the city should dismantle the MPD and replace it with a "transformative new model of public safety". Plans to disband the department were announced days later, with support from a veto-proof majority on the City Council. However, Minneapolis mayor Jacob Frey was opposed to such action. It was soon acknowledged that the city charter prevented the City Council from enacting such plans, which would have to be approved either with joint support from the mayor or by amending the city charter in a public vote. The charter also prevents the MPD from being defunded.

A proposed city charter amendment was passed by the Minneapolis City Council, which, if approved by voters, would replace the MPD with a Department of Community Safety and Violence Prevention, with a provision that would allow but not require a division of "licensed peace officers". However, the Minneapolis City Charter Commission later cancelled plans to put the proposed city charter amendment on the November 2020 ballot, after an increase in crimes throughout the city. A similar measure which appeared on the November 2021 ballot was defeated.

On June 16, 2023, the United States Department of Justice released a report summarizing a comprehensive investigation into the MPD, finding that "the Minneapolis Police Department and the City of Minneapolis engage in a pattern or practice of conduct in violation of the U.S. Constitution and federal law," specifically with regard to the use of deadly force, racial discrimination, violations of free speech rights, and discrimination against people with behavioral health disabilities.

== History ==
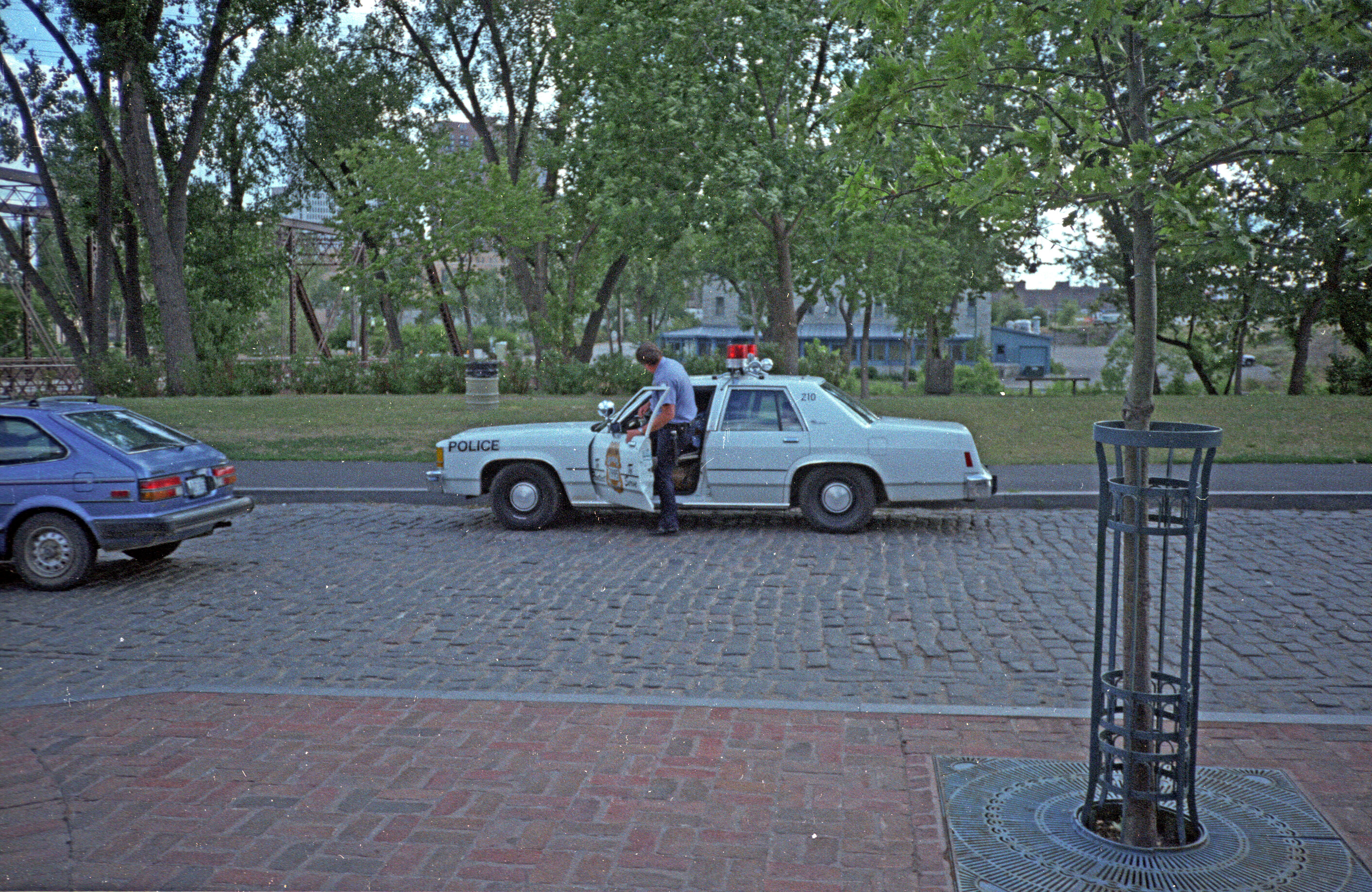
Traffic patrol officer in 1987.

In the 19th century, the City of St. Anthony and Town of Minneapolis were first served by an appointed city marshal based out of St. Anthony who was assisted by constables. Vested with the power of arrest, they rarely used it. Criminals sentenced would be sent to the Ramsey County Jail or the Stillwater Penitentiary until the Hennepin County Courthouse and Jail was built in 1857. When the two cities merged and incorporated as Minneapolis in 1867, Mayor Dorilus Morrison immediately appointed H. H. Brackett as the first police chief. With six patrolmen, the new Police Department of Minneapolis served a population of about 5,000 people. In 1884, the force numbered 100 men and Shingle Creek workhouse was completed.

In 1876, A. A. Ames was elected to his first of four nonconsecutive terms as mayor. He was dubbed "The Shame of Minneapolis" by the national press and fired half of the police department filling the ranks with political supporters once he had been elected a second time in 1901. He appointed his brother Frederick W. Ames as police chief.

The city administration and the police began operating as an organized crime syndicate, extorting protection money and "fines" from illegal businesses of various kinds. The money collected was turned over to the mayor and divided between him and his associates. Minneapolis was promoted as an "open city" to criminals across the country and criminals were released from the city's jail. Illegal businesses such as opium joints, gambling parlors, and houses of prostitution blossomed, many in the Gateway district. It was speculated that women were setting up candy stores to run a legitimate business to children and workers out front, but providing the services of prostitutes in the back.

In 1887, by act of the new Minnesota Legislature and accorded by the Minneapolis City Council, the Board of Police Commissioners was appointed. Vesting all control of the force to the Board, it was an attempt to thwart the corrupt Mayor "Doc" Ames who had replaced the police force with crooks.

The board was short-lived for three terms until it was abolished in 1890 and a new mayor was elected. Military titles were also abolished. By then the city grew to 200,000 people with 200 officers on a budget of $209,278. Patrols were done on foot and by horseback with headquarters at city hall. By 1909, the department added motorcycles, fingerprinting, and utilized telephones. The MPD started using automobiles for patrol in the 1920s and had most patrol officers in cars by the 1930s.

In the 1930s the MPD was involved in ending labor disputes. The department found an accommodation with local mobsters. During World War II 117 MPD officers fought for the United States in the armed forces. In the 1950s population growth increased the city to over 500,000 residents with nearly six hundred sworn officers. In 1952 the Drunkometer, forerunner to the intoxilyzer, was first used in Minneapolis. During the 1960s major riots along Plymouth Avenue resulted in the creation of a Community Relations Division. The 1970s saw the first use of mobile digital technology (MDTs) in squad cars. In the 1980s and 1990s community-oriented policing became paramount. In an effort to get closer to the community the Community Crime Prevention/SAFE Unit was created.

A city policeman, Charles Stenvig served a total of six years as mayor during the period 1969–1978. He returned to his job after his terms.

On July 1, 2021, during a police shortage, a Minneapolis judge sided with eight city residents from north Minneapolis and ordered the Minneapolis Police Department to hire enough police officers to match the minimum required by the City Charter, citing rising crime. This judge's ruling would later be upheld by the Minnesota Supreme Court.

In 2025, MPD began encrypting 911 radio traffic, greatly limiting the public's ability to monitor the department's police scanner.

=== Community relations ===
MPD sought to strengthen community relations with its Community Crime Prevention/Safety for Everyone (CCP/SAFE) program. Specialists were trained to assist neighborhoods in organizing block clubs and disseminate crime information to residents. The Neighborhood Revitalization Program which began in 1960 has just begun to realize its infrastructure and community improvements, as neighborhoods once severely impacted by crime and deterioration had begun to turn around. The Whittier neighborhood became a model example of the program's benefit. CODEFOR, which stands for Computer Optimized DEployment - Focus On Results, finally reached a decade of data collection revealing definitive crime trends and in 2007, the precincts implemented official neighborhood policing plans based on this data. A 2021 lawsuit noted the lack of police operating in the Northside neighborhoods in Minneapolis, which was also blamed for spikes in violent crime.

==== Strikes ====
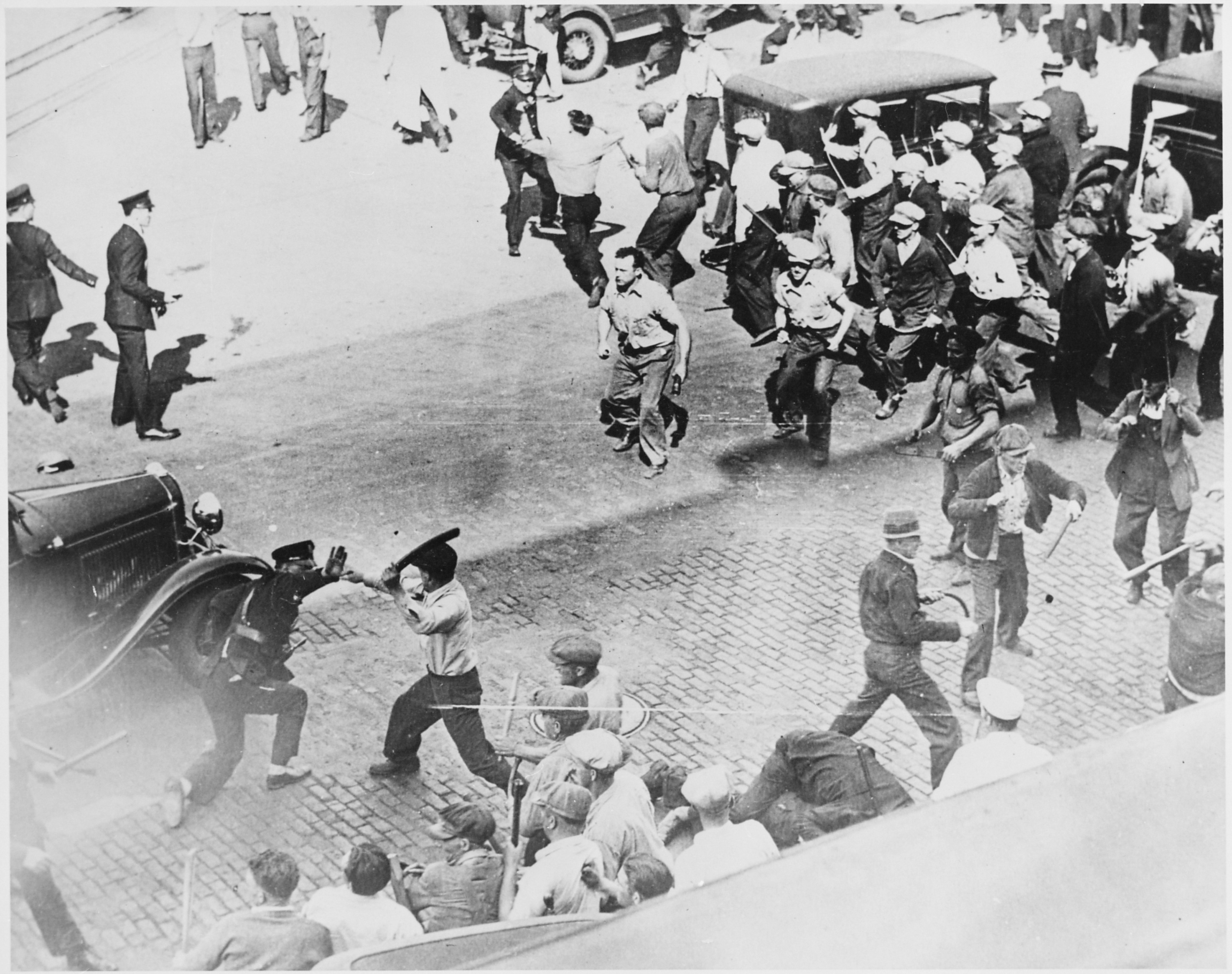
Minneapolis Police intervene in an open battle between striking truckers armed with pipes and the citizen's army (militia), June 1934.

The Minneapolis Teamsters Strike of 1934 was set in May 1934 in the city market (North Loop, Minneapolis) when a new truckers union was not recognized. MPD attempted to open the markets, which were the source of most goods and produce in the city but were blocked by teamsters. Assisted by the Minnesota National Guard and a local militia, the two sides clashed violently for a month with police using gas bombs and brandishing rifles. It ended on August 21 when the union was recognized. Though 200 were injured and four were killed, the strike was a significant event in state and national labor history.

With American prosperity, Minneapolis reached its peak population of over 521,000 in the 1950 census and MPD had nearly 600 sworn officers. The demographics of Minneapolis also identified in the 1950 census as 98% white. While national politics and anti-communism sentiment played out during this decade, urban renewal ravaged the downtown areas and cleared slums, impacting poor communities. Police contended with protests to this clearance and freeway and expressway revolts later in the 1960s.

=== Protests and riots ===
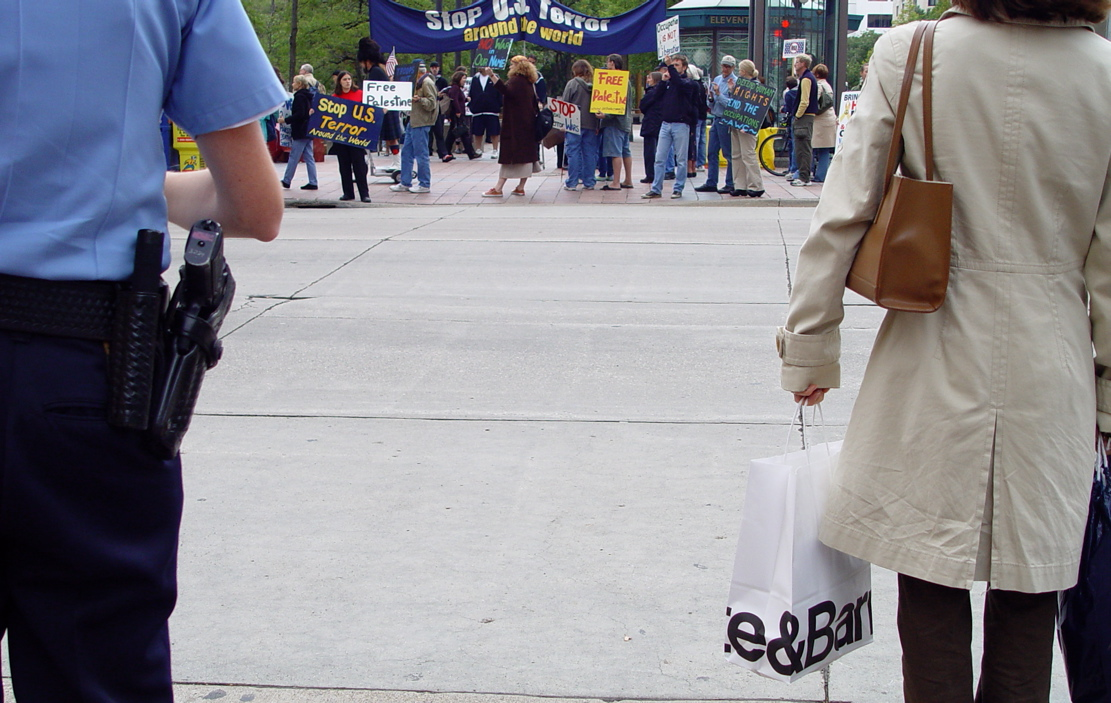
From 2005 to 2006, officers monitored protest rallies against the War in Iraq, in downtown Minneapolis.

The 1960s posed new challenges to the department from increased drug use, counterculture, and societal unrest. Rioting in Minneapolis followed similarly to inequality riots across many major U.S. cities during that era in predominantly African-American communities. Most notably, the Plymouth Avenue Riots in the Near North neighborhood, instigated by East Coast protesters, effectively emptied the area of Jewish and German businesses. The Police Department's poor engagement with the riots resulted in the Community Relations Division and the Model Cities Precinct in 1970. The Minneapolis Domestic Violence Experiment was conducted in 1981 and the study's prolific release led to changes in police protocol with domestic calls in other departments, notably, New York City, Dallas, and New Zealand. From this tumultuous era, the construction of the freeway system and subsequent white flight emptied Minneapolis' population to a low of 368,383 in 1990. However the demand for policing continued to rise to over 700 officers in that decade as drug use and gang activity continued to accelerate.

In 1998, the re-routing of Minnesota State Highway 55 brought protests from the Hiawatha neighborhood of Longfellow community and members of the Mendota Mdewakanton community. Police protection was ordered for construction workers. In July 2000, a clash with protesters at an International Society of Animal Genetics conference and a following raid on a non-profit office suspected of organizing the protest drew attention of the City Council. They publicly questioned Chief Olson who revealed that forty undercover police agents were in the demonstrations and that 400 to 500 Minneapolis police officers were assigned to the week-long conference.

=== Crime and crime rates ===
Among American cities with a population of over 100,000, Minneapolis is in the top twenty-five in terms of crime rate. Some years Minneapolis is in the top ten in the nation for cities with most crime but that is very few years. There are 311 cities with over 100,000 residents in the USA. Minneapolis is also in the top 100 in the nation for cities with most crime usually coming in around 50. There are over 20,000 cities in the nation. The top 100 with most crime make up 0.5% of cities.

In 1995, Mark Koscielski, a gun shop owner in present-day Midtown Phillips coined the term "Murderapolis". His T-shirts featuring the derisive term were quoted in a New York Times article. Murders had indeed peaked that year and the department sent three officers to New York City to study the Fixing Broken Windows crime-prevention program implemented by then Mayor Rudy Giuliani and Police Chief William Bratton. The officers returned to implement a new policing strategy, the Computer Optimized DEployment - Focus On Results (CODEFOR). A computer-based system, the strategy involves every unit of the MPD from patrol to special units to identify and concentrate policing on hot spots of crime. As technology has improved, the department continued to collect and increase reliance on statistical and data-based information.

Similar to other cities nationally, crime plummeted in Minneapolis by 42% from 2005 to 2011.

==== Organized crime ====
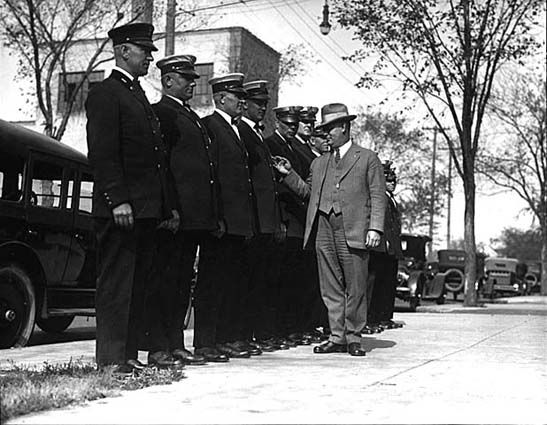
Chief Frank W. Brunskill inspecting officers at Station Number 5 in 1925. Brunskill was also at the heart of Supreme Court case Near v. Minnesota involving Minnesota's Gag Law.

In the 1920s, criminal activity had grown to an alarming level. Saint Paul's Chief of Police, John J. O'Connor, established the O'Connor System which allowed gang-land criminals to live in the city as long as they committed no crimes there. In exchange, police provided protection and tips regarding impending federal raids and helped keep criminals free by refusing to extradite them elsewhere. As a result, high-profile criminals such as Machine Gun Kelly, John Dillinger and Baby Face Nelson took refuge in St. Paul and committed crimes across the region, including Minneapolis. These criminals then fled to St. Paul, where they were all but untouchable. Soon, the corruption spread to the Minneapolis Police Department, who instituted their own similar system. An Irishman named Edward G. "Big Ed" Morgan operated a gambling den under police protection but also commanded crime in partnership with Prohibition bootleggers. Then, Danny Hogan, an underworld "Godfather" of Saint Paul allied with Morgan.

The police of Minneapolis and St. Paul are said not to interfere with these criminals, there being an understanding between Dan Hogan and the St. Paul Police and Edward Morgan and the Minneapolis Police that if the criminal gangs controlled by them refrain from committing crime in the Twin Cities, that they will not be disturbed. It is a well known fact in the community that a very little crime such as bank robberies, etc, is committed here, the criminals are safe as long as they live up to the pledge made by Dan Hogan and Edward Morgan to the local police.|1926 FBI Memo|

The department profiled the community's Chinese population in response to Minneapolis events of the Tong wars killings between the local Hip Sing Tong and On Leong Tong. The raids and arrests were ineffective and no Chinese were deported. The tensions faded with the gradual assimilation of the city's small Chinese population and repeal of exclusion laws.

The Great Depression and the 1930s followed similarly to other growing U.S. cities as the department quelled labor disputes and continued to fight gangsters during the waning years of Prohibition. On December 16, 1932, members of the infamous Barker-Karpis gang robbed the Third Northwestern Bank in downtown Northeast, Minneapolis and killed responding policemen Ira Leon Evans and Leo Gorski. The sensational manner in which the gang blasted their way out led to an intense manhunt that netted some of the culprits but not the leaders who had fled. In a sign of the Great Depression, the city controller's office revealed that the two patrolmen had been working without pay due to a shortage in the police fund. Mayor Anderson blamed "large taxpayers" as not paying their fair share of taxes, shortening the police budget and limiting the department's ability to fund and equip officers.

During World War II, over a hundred police officers entered the armed forces. At home, the stress of the war and fear of attack developed into air raid drills where two wardens were assigned to each city block. Following the war, the program was chartered by the city as the Police Reserve under MPD's Civil Defense unit in 1952. The Reserve bolsters MPD presence at major events to this day. The group's message had exacerbated a real ongoing issue of police brutality in the latter century.

=== Gangs ===
Minneapolis has more than twenty gangs with over 1,000 gang members. Police say gangs account for at least half of the violent crime in Minneapolis. Tensions between gangs and the Minneapolis Police Department were high following the acquittal of officers in the Rodney King beating trial in Los Angeles. In 1992, the MPD contracted with The City, Inc., formed by activist Spike Moss, to bring together active gang members and MPD members in order to encourage younger gang members to give up crime. On September 25, 1992, Officer Jerome (Jerry) Haaf was taking a break at the officers' popular Pizza Shack restaurant in Phillips and was shot behind the back by two Vice Lord gang members. The investigator with him was also wounded. Haaf died from his wounds at Hennepin County Medical Center and the members were later caught, convicted and sent to prison. Chief John Laux suggested the murder was possibly retaliation for an earlier incident in which Metro Transit Police forcibly removed a blind black man who did not have bus fare. At a community meeting earlier in the evening at North Community High School, gang members and community activists interrupted decrying the incident as evidence of police brutality and insensitivity. Former Police Chief Tony Bouza who oversaw the department in the 1980s called the force at the time "brutal". Mayor Sharon Sayles Belton, an African-American herself, stated in 1994 that excessive force was a problem.

==== Civil rights stalls ====
In 2002, then-Chief Robert Olson was accused of stalling federal U.S. Department of Justice mediation between the MPD and hometown civil rights groups focused around North Minneapolis. Unpopular with Mayor R. T. Rybak, Olson was ousted in 2003 and William McManus was appointed, former chief of Dayton, Ohio, and former assistant chief in Washington, D.C. His tenure was intended to reverse Olson's past actions. McManus worked on improving internal promotions and politics within the department to achieve racial equality in officer ranks. The attempted overhaul of Internal Affairs and greater attention over policing did generate larger respect for the department from communities of color and even gang members. However, his support was split in the council, and though personally endorsed, he conflicted with Mayor Rybak over promotions and the handling of the 2003 Duy Ngo incident, in which Ngo, an undercover officer, was shot by another officer. In early 2006, facing an uncertain reconfirmation for a second three-year term, McManus sought and accepted the police chief position in San Antonio, Texas.

Though McManus improved internal diversity during his tenure, his efforts did not address department racism, traced to former chief Olson, and continuing under chief Harteau. In December 2007, five high ranking black police officers filed a lawsuit against the department alleging a long history of systemic racial discrimination and a hostile working environment toward black officers and in April 2009, the city settled with them for $740,000.

=== LGBTQ repression ===
Between the 1960s and the 1980s, the Minneapolis Police Department deliberately targeted multiple Minneapolis gay bars in raids and employed indecency laws to limit LGBTQ expression. Beginning in the 1960s, the department formed The Morals Squad, designed to regulate LGBTQ bodies and social interactions deemed undesirable. The Morals Squad carried out raids on Sutton Place, a gay bar on North Seventh Street in the North Loop neighborhood, suspending its liquor license in 1966. The squad described men kissing, dancing, and holding hands as "indecent acts" worthy of challenge in court.

Between 1979 and 1986, the MPD cracked down on public sex cultures in the Central and Powderhorn neighborhoods, disproportionately arresting and repressing poor, transgender, sex workers, and people of color in the area. Officers made use of laws against "lewd and lascivious behavior" and indecent exposure during arrests. The MPD was justified also by the strong anti-pornography movement in the city, headed by radical and lesbian feminists. In 1979 and 1980, police also raided the Locker Room and Big Daddy's bathhouse, two gay bathhouses in the Loring Park neighborhood. Officers ticketed 116 and 102 men, in December 1979 and February 1980, respectively. Nine men were also arrested for sodomy in the 1979 raid. By the mid-1980s, LGBTQ Minneapolis residents were also being targeted in order to control the spread of HIV/AIDS, and by 1988 bathhouses were banned in the city.

=== Disaster response and military support ===
In 2007, Assistant Chief Tim Dolan succeeded McManus and was shortly promoted to police chief. Sharon Lubinski was appointed Assistant Chief. During Chief Dolan's tenure, the I-35W Mississippi River bridge collapsed on August 1, 2007. Agencies involved in the recovery efforts operated smoothly under post 9/11 disaster and emergency management training. Providing 75 law enforcement units, the MPD's immediate role was to ensure safety and control of neighborhoods surrounding the bridge. For several months after, the traffic control unit was on call to direct traffic. The Minneapolis Emergency Communications Center (9-1-1 center) was recognized in 2008 for their efficient role in the incident.

=== Jamar Clark demonstrations ===
In response to the November 2015 shooting of Jamar Clark by Minneapolis police, citizens organized an extended sit-in at the department's Fourth Precinct, which is responsible for public safety in north Minneapolis, where Clark had been killed. Numerous other demonstrations were held in and around Minneapolis, calling for charges against the officers and the release of videotapes of the incident. Online efforts, including from a petition by Color of Change with 70,000 signatures, supported the in-community protests.

City leaders and the Minnesota Bureau of Criminal Apprehension (BCA) refused to release the videotapes, citing the ongoing investigation. Minnesota Governor Mark Dayton was allowed to view them and reported that they were "inconclusive". In February 2016, the NAACP and ACLU sued the DOJ to release the videotapes.

Police and protesters initially exchanged charges of violence by the other at the precinct occupation, but, police Chief Harteau denied claims that protesters had fired shots and thrown molotov cocktails, instead blaming the incitements on "anarchists" from outside the area.

Black Lives Matter demanded that Hennepin County bypass the traditional Grand Jury process for determining whether to press charges against the officers, arguing that Grand Juries rarely prosecute police. In November 2015, Freeman initially balked. But, in a victory for protestors who had conducted weekly demonstrations at his office for what they called Freeman Fridays, the prosecutor changed his mind with a statement released on March 16, 2016, citing the fact that Grand Jury proceedings lack the level of transparency the citizens were demanding. In addition, Freeman also announced that he would stop all use of Grand Juries in any future police-involved shootings. On March 30, 2016, Freeman announced that he would not charge the officers, citing evidence that they had acted within legal boundaries.

==== Minnesota Lynx ====
Minneapolis police officers rejected a T-shirt that Minnesota Lynx captains wore at a pregame press conference meant to draw attention to problems between police and blacks, with four of them announcing they would disrupt their off-hours contracts to provide security for the Lynx WNBA basketball games. The front of the shirts featured the phrase "Change Starts With Us: Justice & Accountability". On the back was the Dallas Police Department emblem and two black men, to honor Dallas officers who had been killed in a mass shooting during a protest there, and the names of Philando Castile and Alton Sterling who had been killed by police in Falcon Heights, Minnesota, and Baton Rouge, Louisiana, respectively; the bottom read "Black Lives Matter". Other current and retired professional teams and athletes supported the players.

The Lynx players made clear that they sought healing and progress not blame.

You'll see on the backs of our shirts that we're highlighting a longtime problem of racial profiling and unjust violence against blacks in our country. But we do not in any way condone violence against the men and women who service in our police force. Senseless violence and retaliation will not bring us peace.

— Lynx Captain Maya Moore, in a pregame press conference

Chief Harteau expressed disappointment in the officers. "Although these officers were working on behalf of the Lynx, when wearing a Minneapolis Police uniform. I expect all officers to adhere to our core values and to honor their oath of office," she said in a statement addressing their announcement. "Walking off the job and defaulting their contractual obligation to provide a service to the Lynx does not conform to the expectations held by the public for the uniform these officers wear." Mayor Hodges comments were even stronger in her response to ugly comments by the head of the police union.

In contrast to the police chief, the president of the Police Officers Federation of Minneapolis Bob Kroll called the team "pathetic" while saying he "commended" the officers, before threatening that other officers might follow suit, saying: "If (the players) are going to keep their stance, all officers may refuse to work there." Minneapolis Mayor Betsy Hodges repudiated Kroll's statement, writing that "Bob Kroll's remarks about the Lynx are jackass remarks .... Bob Kroll sure as hell doesn't speak for me about the Lynx or about anything else."

=== George Floyd protests ===
The initial police statement regarding the murder of George Floyd indicated Floyd had been "suffering medical distress" without reference to the actions of officer Derek Chauvin. A witness, Darnella Frazier, recorded the assault and murder, contradicting the department's statement. Frazier, who was 17 years old at the time, won the 2020 PEN/Benenson Courage Award from PEN America and a special citation from the Pulitzer Prize committee in 2021.

=== 2020-2021 reforms ===
The Minnesota Department of Human Rights, an administrative agency of the state, opened a civil rights investigation into the practices of the Minneapolis Police Department on June 2. One immediate result was a consent decree with the city; on June 5, the Minneapolis City Council authorized the mayor to agree to a temporary restraining order with the State of Minnesota banning chokeholds and requiring police officers to both report and intervene against the use of excessive force by other officers, as well as banning neck restraints and also the use of crowd control weapons such as chemical agents and rubber bullets without permission from the police chief or deputies. Minneapolis mayor Jacob Frey then approved the order and directed these changes to go into effect immediately. On June 8, 2020, the reforms to the Minneapolis Police Department were approved by Hennepin County Court judge Karen Janisch. Despite ordering that the Minneapolis Police Department must comply with the civil rights investigation, the six reform measures which the Hennepin County court ordered the Minneapolis Police Department to comply with are preliminary. On June 10, 2020, Minneapolis Police Chief Medaria Arradondo cancelled future contract negotiations with the police union and announced plans to bring in outside experts to examine how the existing contracts can be restructured to create a warning system which will provide transparency about "troubled" officers and "flexibility for true reform".

On June 26, 2020, the Minneapolis City Council approved a proposed charter amendment to replace the Minneapolis Police Department. The proposed amendment was drafted by council members Jeremiah Ellison, Alondra Cano, Cam Gordon, Steve Fletcher and council President Lisa Bender. The proposed amendment would replace the Minneapolis Police Department with a Department of Community Safety and Violence Prevention, eliminate the city charter's requirement of a minimum number of police officers based on population, and would allow for, but not require, the new department to have a Division of Law Enforcement Services. The new department would be led by someone with "non-law enforcement experience in community safety services, including but not limited to public health and/or restorative justice approaches."

On July 21, 2020, the Minnesota state legislature passed major police reform legislation. The law bans police from using chokehold restraint, unless they were at greater risk. The law also bans the old warrior training program, which was regarded as dehumanizing people and encouraging aggressive conduct. The law also requires training peace officers throughout the state of Minnesota to deal with people with autism or in a mental health crisis and also de-escalation training for situations that could turn volatile. The law also creates a special independent unit at the Bureau of Criminal Apprehension for investigations of fatal police encounters and also a new community relations advisory council to consult with the Police Officers Standards and Training Board on policy changes. The police reform legislation was signed into law by Minnesota Governor Tim Walz on July 23, 2020.

On August 5, 2020, the Minneapolis Charter Commission voted 10–5 to keep the proposed amendment off the November 2020 ballot. Instead, the review of the proposed amendment will be extended by at least 90 more days. Some members of the Commission criticized how the proposed amendment was being rushed.

=== Aftermath ===
Since the murder of George Floyd on May 25, more than 100 people were shot in Minneapolis in less than 50 days, compared with 269 in all of 2019. There have also been 32 murders in 2020, compared with 48 in 2019.

Meanwhile, 75 of the department's 800 officers have stopped working and filed for disability pensions, while another 75 are applying for such pensions while still working.

False rumors about the suicide of a homicide suspect who was being pursued by police forces led to a riot on August 26, 2020. At the time, the homicide was the 52nd of the year in the city. Many of the city's residents were still on edge from the murder of George Floyd the previous May; the police department had mischaracterized Chauvin's murder of Floyd as a death following "medical distress" in early statements about the incident. Demonstrators reacting to news of a new shooting death, that video later showed was a suicide, did not trust initial police accounts of the incident. Many stores and business were looted and vandalized, and several fires were reported. Two Minneapolis police officers were seriously injured during the unrest.

In September, The New York Times reported that the City Council's pledge in June to dismantle MPD "has been rejected by the city's mayor, a plurality of residents in recent public opinion polls, and an increasing number of community groups. Taking its place have been the types of incremental reforms that the city's progressive politicians had denounced." A poll by the Star Tribune reported that a plurality of residents, including 50 percent of Black people, opposed reducing the size of MPD. In November, The Washington Post reported that violent crime had surged in Minneapolis since the George Floyd protests began. In July 2021, Hennepin County Judge Jamie Anderson ruled that the Minneapolis City Council and Mayor's office "failed to perform an official duty clearly imposed by law" after failing to fund and hire enough officers to meet the city charter's minimum police officer requirement and ordered the Minneapolis Police Department, though not the city itself, to hire more officers. On August 10, 2021, the Minnesota Supreme Court rejected an effort which was made by the city of Minneapolis to overturn the ruling. A proposed Minneapolis charter amendment that would have replaced the Minneapolis Police Department with a Department of Public Safety and eliminated the position of Chief of Police was rejected by a margin of 56% to 44% in the November 2021 general election.

== Racial discrimination ==
According to police records documenting use of force, Black people were the target of police force in 6,650 out of 11,500 recorded acts of force, 58% of the time, despite comprising 19% of the Minneapolis population. According to a New York Times analysis, this means that Black people were seven times more likely to be the subject of MPD force as white people. Between 2000 and 2021, Minneapolis police killed 35 people; of them, 23 were Black, 5 were white, 3 were Asian, 2 were American Indian, and 2 were Hispanic. Of the 149 Minnesotans killed by police between 2000 and 2015, 67 were "people of color".

In 2001, the tactic of racial profiling became an issue. The state legislature attempted to mandate data collection of a person's race in traffic stops to reveal profiling trends. Though the measure was defeated, departments were offered incentives to volunteer for a pilot project to collect the data. MPD released its report in 2003 indicating it was more likely to stop a non-white person. The city under Mayor R.T. Rybak convened an audit of MPD to determine why and formulate steps to address the issue.

Despite these and other programs and promises of police reform, actual improvements have been only marginally effective and, according to some, have regressed going into 2016.

In 2012-2014 the incarceration rate for Black people was nearly ten times that of white people, as explained by rates of criminal acts. In 2015, 50% of all youth imprisoned in the State of Minnesota were Black youth from Hennepin County. That same year, 35% of adult inmates in Minnesota, 25% of whom were from Hennepin County, were Black. During the five-year period from 2015 to 2020, the department reported its officers used violence against Black people at about seven times the rate of violence used against white people.

Black people account for 60% of the Minneapolis Police Department's low-level arrests, overall. Between 2012 and 2014 Minneapolis police arrested blacks nearly ten times more for low-level offenses than white people. Police officers have more options for how to respond to low-level offenses, which, if they lead to an arrest, can start or sustain a downward spiral of a life-cycle of arrests, incarceration, and unemployment. Of nearly 10,000 low-level arrests over 33 months made by 1,017 Minneapolis officers between 2013 and 2014, the vast majority were made by eight officers. Seven averaged between 1,000 and 1,250. One made 2,026. In 2014, the average number of low-level arrests per officer was 51. Even taking out the eight officers who make the majority of arrests, Black citizens were still arrested eight and a half times more than whites were for overall low-level violations. Low-level offenses include things like: curfew violations, loitering, trespassing, drinking in public, and open bottle.

In a letter to Minneapolis Mayor Betsy Hodges and chief Harteau, the American Civil Liberties Union of Minnesota and its Criminal Law Reform Project reported that the State of Minnesota was the third highest in the country for arrests for possession of marijuana, at nearly 8%, compared to the national average of under 4%; and that Minneapolis Police Department's rates "are even worse". Between 2004 and 2012 the department was, on average, 11.51 times more likely to arrest an African American person than a white person for marijuana possession. The inequities extended past controlled substances arrests. For the same period, Minneapolis Black citizens were 8.86 more likely than white citizens to be arrested for disorderly conduct, 7.54 times more likely than white citizens to be arrested for vagrancy; and Minneapolis youth of color were 16.39 times more likely than white youth to be arrested for curfew or loitering offenses.

Data from 2021 showed that MPD stopped Black drivers for minor traffic violations at nine times the rate of white drivers, and searched Black drivers at 29 times the rate of white drivers.

== Officers killed in the line of duty ==
Fifty officers and three dogs have been killed in the line of duty while working for the MPD. The first officer to be killed in the line of duty was killed by gunfire in 1884. The most recent death in the line of duty was in 2024 when Officer Jamal Mitchell was shot to death while responding to a shooting. From 1906 to 2009 an officer died in the line of duty every 7 years or less. The list below shows the known ways MPD officers died in the line of duty.

- Animal related 1
- Assault 3
- Automobile crash 1
- Drowned 1
- Electrocuted 1
- Gunfire 28
- Heart attack 3
- Motorcycle crash 5
- Struck by vehicle 5
- Vehicle pursuit 1
- Vehicular assault 1

== Misconduct and internal affairs ==
=== Complaints ===
In 1989, the department conducted a drug raid at the home of an elderly couple, Lloyd Smalley and Lillian Weiss, after receiving inaccurate information from an informant. The flashbang grenades police used in the raid set the home on fire. Police said they were certain no one was inside, and so, at first, made no attempt at rescue. Smalley and Weiss died of smoke inhalation.

In 2010, police raided the apartment of Rickia Russell looking for illegal drugs. While Russell was eating dinner with her boyfriend, police threw a flashbang grenade after breaching the door. The exploding flashbang gave Russell third degree burns on both calves, and burns to her head. The contraband the squad was looking for was not found in the apartment, and the Minneapolis City Council agreed to pay $1 million in damages.

In 2016, a study commissioned by the city's Police Conduct Oversight Commission found that making a misconduct complaint at most Minneapolis Police precincts or online resources was difficult if not nearly impossible. When undercover lawyers tested Department personnel and system they observed numerous cases of obstruction or unnecessarily complicated processes. The 4th Precinct, in north Minneapolis, received heavy scrutiny after the police shooting of Jamar Clark, a young black man there, in 2015.

When citizens have succeeded in filing complaints about Minneapolis police misconduct, however, little meaningful action has been taken by the department. During one period more than half of the 439 reviewed complaint cases were dismissed because they were older than 270 days. No officers were disciplined.

On April 27, 2022, the Minnesota Department of Human Rights concluded an investigation into the MPD and other city leadership. The report concluded an underlying racial bias in a number of police-citizen interactions.

=== Misconduct lawsuits ===
Minneapolis made $14 million in payouts for alleged police misconduct between 2006 and 2012. In 2020, KSTP-TV News' 5 Investigates unit found Minneapolis had paid millions of dollars in settlements because officers had lied about use of force, dishonesty for which officers are rarely disciplined.

==== Rod Webber incidents ====
In 2015, Minneapolis officer Rod Webber threatened a black teenager, Hamza Jeylani, who captured the incident on his phone. "Plain and simple, I'm going to be honest with you. If you fuck with me I'm going to break your legs," Webber told Jeylani. When Jeylani asked Webber why he was being pulled over, Webber replied, "because I feel like arresting you." Webber was subsequently fired. While still reported as fired, a new investigation was opened against him in December 2020 into allegations that he stated he was "proud Americans killed Somalis in Black Hawk Down" when he pulled over Somali teenagers, during a separate traffic stop in 2015. The Police Officers Federation of Minneapolis was said to have covered up the incident after it was reported.

==== Green Bay incident ====
The department did respond in 2013, however, when the Green Bay, Wisconsin Police Department responded to a disturbance that involved two off-duty Minneapolis police officers. Both officers were subsequently fired. The incident began with Shawn Powell and Brian Thole, both employed at the department's north Minneapolis precinct at the time, texting a Green Bay officer he knew, Nate Allen, referring to Allen as "Nigs", and, when Allen did not respond, "you faggots". Referring to a black man who drove by, he said to Allen and another Green Bay officer, "What is that? Green Bay is too nigger friendly." Powell repeated the racial slur a number of times later related to a clash he and Thole had with four black men, at least one of whom Powell hit in the face. Questioned about what started the incident, Powell told Green Bay police that the other men were "doing their monkey shit". When Green Bay officers did not pursue the black citizens, the Minneapolis officers became abusive with their professional peers, calling them "fucking jokes", and repeatedly disparaging them with similar language. Thole tried to talk them out of making a report because, he said, "I have a lesbian fucking chief who's looking to fire people for any reason."

Both officers had previous misconduct issues. Powell was involved in a lawsuit against the City related to him and other officers severely beating an African American man in 2010. The suit was settled with Minneapolis paying the victim $235,000. Powell was also involved in a lawsuit for the wrongful death of a Somali man who, according to legal documents, was brutally assaulted, tortured and killed. Both Thole and Powell were fired in December 2013.

==== Mike Spann beating ====
Three white Minneapolis police officers were charged in the beating of an African American man in a suburb south of Minneapolis, in 2013. William C. Woodis, Christopher J. Bennett and Andrew R. Allen were off-duty and having drinks at a bar when a black man introduced himself to them. When Apple Valley, Minnesota, police were called the officers claimed that Spann followed them out of the bar, but security camera footage showed them following him. Spann's nephew, who was also hit by the officers, as well as another witness who did not know Spann or the officers, said that the officers were "on attack". In June 2013, Woodis and Bennett pled guilty to misdemeanor charges of disorderly conduct. Charges against Allen were dropped. However, it was also alleged that during the incident, which occurred in November 2012, all three officers were also allegedly used racial slurs as well, which made them all subject an internal investigation by then police chief Janee Harteau. The internal investigation was still ongoing in December 2013.

==== Assault of Mohammad Osman ====
On October 10, 2017, a Minneapolis jury convicted former Minneapolis police officer Christopher Reiter of third degree aggravated assaulting Mohamed Osman during an arrest in May 2016. During the incident, which was caught on tape, Reiter kicked Osman in the head. On December 12, 2017, Hennepin County District Judge Fred Karasov sentenced Reiter to serve six months in a workhouse prison and three years of probation, the maximum sentence for his kind of conviction. The incident also resulted in Reiter being stripped of his peace officer license, thus barring from him from becoming a police officer again.

==== Killing of Justine Damond ====
On July 15, 2017, Justine Ruszczyk Damond, a 40-year-old Australian-American woman, called 911 to report a woman possibly being raped in an alley behind her house. When the police arrived, she was shot and killed by police officer Mohamed Noor, of Somali-American descent, who had been on the force for two years. Following an eight-month investigation from Hennepin county attorney's office and the Minnesota Bureau of Criminal Apprehension, Noor was charged with third degree murder, second intentional murder and second degree manslaughter. In April 2019, Noor was convicted of third degree murder and second degree manslaughter but acquitted of second degree murder. On June 7, 2019, Noor was sentenced to 12.5 years in prison. Damond's family brought a civil lawsuit against the city alleging violation of Damond's civil rights, which the city settled for twenty million dollars, one of the largest-ever settlements in a suit involving a police killing. In July 2019, Noor filed an appeal to overturn his convictions of third degree murder and second degree manslaughter. The conviction on third-degree murder was overturned by the Minnesota Supreme Court on September 15, 2021, and in October 2021, his sentence was revised to 4.75 years in prison.

==== Shooting of Jamar Clark ====
The Minneapolis police shooting of Jamar Clark on November 16, 2015, heightened tensions between the city and its citizens. Clark, a 24-year-old African-American man who family say was starting to find his way after a troubled past, died two days later. Police said that Clark reached for Officer Mark Ringgenberg's gun when Officer Dustin Schwarze shot him. Officer Schwarze and Officer Ringgenberg responded to a domestic violence call, but several witnesses disagreed, saying that Clark was handcuffed and thus unable to at the time. Video showed the struggle and confirmed that Clark did indeed try to disarm Officer Ringgenberg. Mayor Betsy Hodges requested an investigation by the United States Department of Justice Civil Rights Division of the federal government. The U.S. Department of Justice (DOJ) arrived a week later. Eight months later, Hodges announced that the DOJ had declined to bring civil rights charges confirming the officers' account of the incident.

Both Schwarze and Ringgenberg had been previously sued for misconduct in federal court. On June 13, 2019, Schwartze was removed as a plaintiff in a civil lawsuit filed by Clark's family. In August 2019, the Minneapolis City approved a $200,000 settlement which Clark's family had accepted.

==== Murder of George Floyd ====
On May 26, 2020, the Minneapolis Police Department garnered much media attention after a video went viral of Derek Chauvin, a white, on-duty Minneapolis police officer, murdering George Floyd, an African American man. The video shows Chauvin kneeling on Floyd's neck, with Floyd saying that he could not breathe and losing consciousness. According to police spokesman John Elder, officers were called at around 8:00 pm on Monday, May 25, to investigate a report of a forgery at a business. Police reportedly found a man, believed to be in his 40s, matching the suspect's description in a car. The man reportedly resisted arrest and was taken to Hennepin County Medical Center, where he was pronounced dead. The FBI and state agents announced investigations into Floyd's murder. The officers involved were placed on administrative leave, per department protocol and fired later the same day. Criminal charges against the four officers were subsequently laid. The city agreed to pay $27 million to settle a civil lawsuit from Floyd's family, the largest pre-trial settlement for a civil-rights claim ever made in the US. Chauvin was charged with unintentional second-degree murder, third-degree murder and second-degree manslaughter, while the other three faced charges of aiding and abetting both second-degree murder and second-degree manslaughter. On April 20, 2021, following a criminal trial, a jury convicted Chauvin on all three charges.

On June 16, 2023, the Justice Department issued a report on the police department which said, "Our investigation found that the systemic problems in MPD made what happened to George Floyd possible." Examination of events years prior to Floyd's murder revealed patterns of unlawful use of deadly force, higher rates of traffic stops, searches, and unlawful use of force against African Americans and Native Americans, officers making racist comments, first amendment violations against protesters and journalists, and indiscriminate use of force against peaceful versus violent protesters.

=== Rape kits ===
The department has a large backlog of rape kits it has never tested. In 2015, 194 such kits were discovered. Mayor Jacob Frey called the unprocessed evidence an "unjustified mistake". In 2019, about an additional 1,700 untested kits were found. Police Chief Medaria Arradondo said he had no explanation for the discrepancy in the reported numbers or why so many kits went untested.

== Organization ==
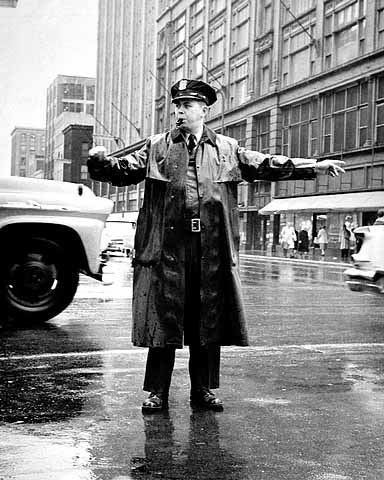
Traffic control in 1959.

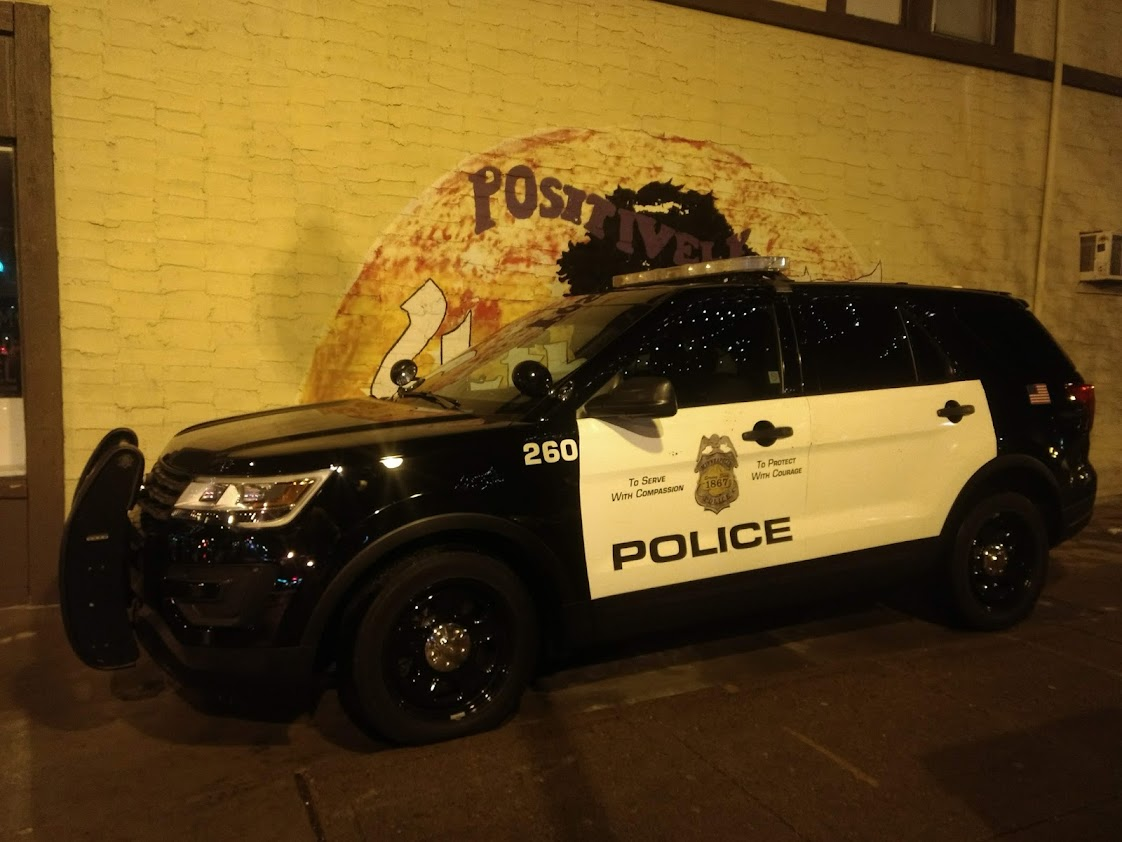
Minneapolis Police Department Ford Police Interceptor Utility (Explorer)

The heads of the Minneapolis Police Department are the chief of police and the assistant chief. The department is organized into three administrative bureaus: Patrol, Investigations, and Professional Standards, each of which are led by a deputy chief. The Patrol Bureau divides the city into five precincts each with a precinct commander, given the rank of inspector. MPD operates under a decentralized structure giving independence to each precinct and bureau to manage crime and policing. Under the city charter, the mayor has "complete power" over the police department. The city charter also limits the power which the city council has to cut funding for the Minneapolis Police Department, which must represent a proportion of the city's population at a minimum of .0017 employees per citizen.

The MPD had over 800 police officers. Of the 800 police officers 100 were lieutenants, 200 were sergeants, and 500 were officers. Forty-five lieutenants oversaw specialty units, forty oversaw investigative units and only fifteen oversaw patrol shifts. One hundred sergeants worked in investigations. Fifty sergeants worked in specialty units and fifty worked in patrol. Three hundred officers worked in patrol while 200 were in specialty units. As of 2024 MPD has roughly 570 total police officers.

Uniformed workers are represented by the Police Officers Federation of Minneapolis. In 2020, the union was headed by Lieutenant Bob Kroll. He was replaced in 2021 by Sherrel Schmidt

=== Demographic composition ===
In 2016, 76.9% of full time sworn officers were White, 8.56% were Black, 5.47% were Asian, 4.4% were Hispanic, and 4.6% were other race.

=== Patrol Bureau ===
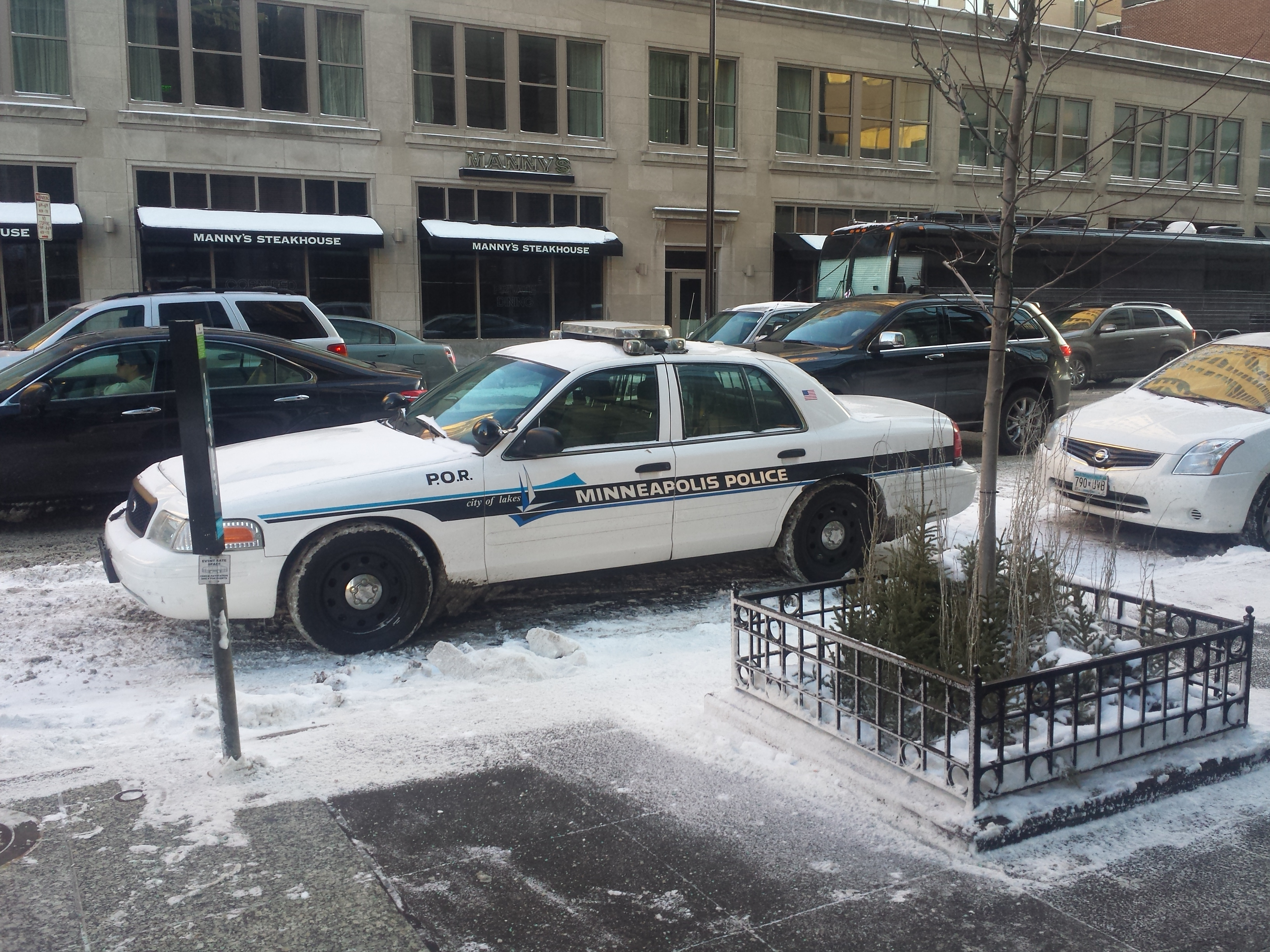
Minneapolis Police car with livery used from the early 1990s to late 2000s.

The Patrol Bureau provides comprehensive police services such as 911 response, crime prevention, traffic control and emergency services. The bureau comprises the five precincts, the Special Operations Division, Community Crime Prevention/SAFE Central, and the Police Athletic League.

Each precinct has a Community Response Team that does undercover street level narcotics and prostitution investigations as well as plain clothes patrol. Each Precinct also has a directed patrol beat unit that does uniform or plain clothes patrol in cars, on foot or on bikes. The beats do crowd control, directed patrol in high crime areas or crime specific patrol like gang or drug suppression. They also serve as the primary responder to special events and demonstrations that have a risk for civil disorder.

==== Special Operations Division ====
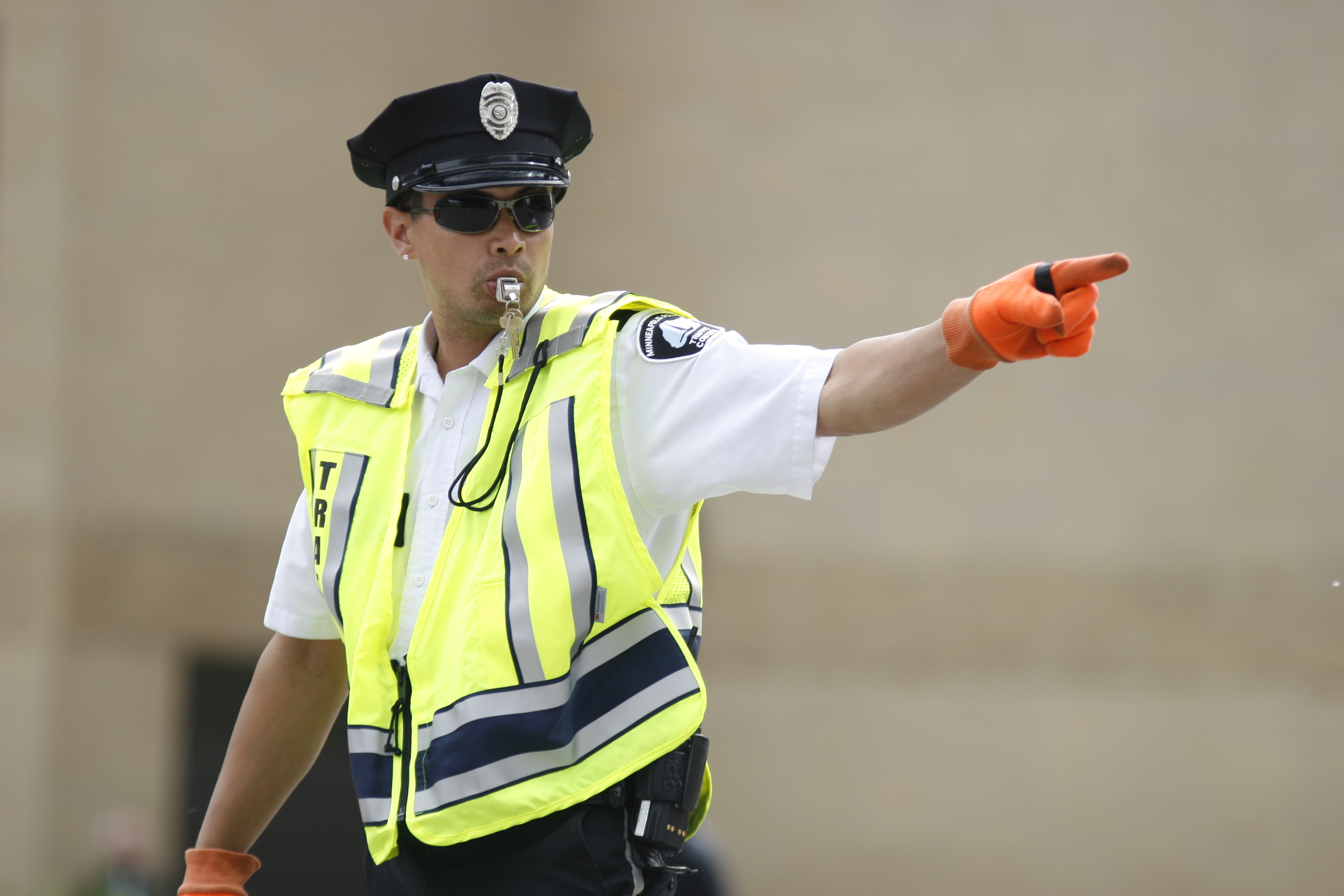
Minneapolis traffic officer

- Bomb-Arson Unit
- Canine

The Minneapolis Police Canine Unit has 17 canine teams and the training facility is in Northeast, Minneapolis.

- Homeland Security
- Mounted Patrol

The Minneapolis Mounted Patrol Unit is headquartered at the First Precinct and has eight full-time riders of the thirty fully trained MPD sworn officers in the unit. It is the largest mounted patrol in the five-state Upper Midwest and operates on donations. Minneapolis owns eleven horses that commute from a rented barn in Delano, Minnesota. Part of the older waterworks plant in Columbia Heights will be converted into a new stable.

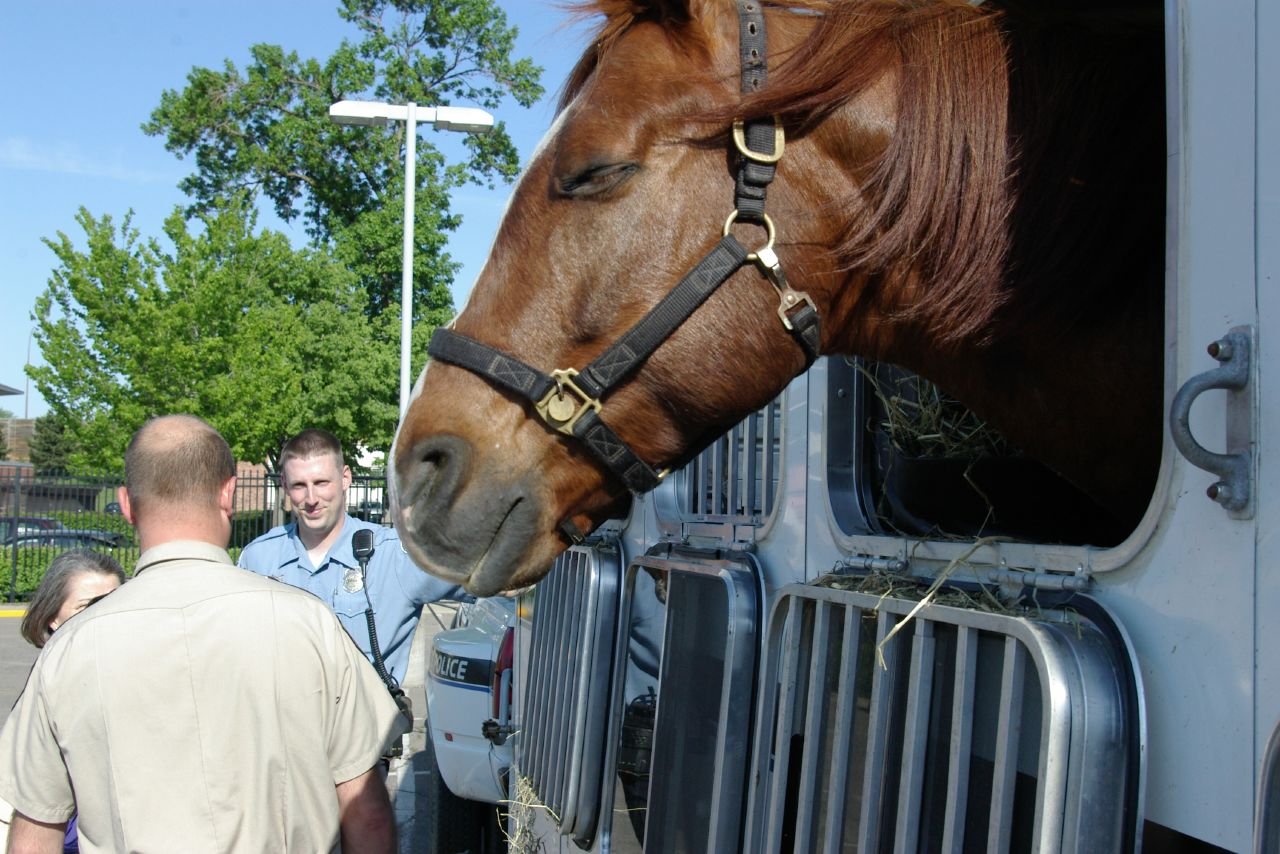
A horse at a police fest in Minneapolis

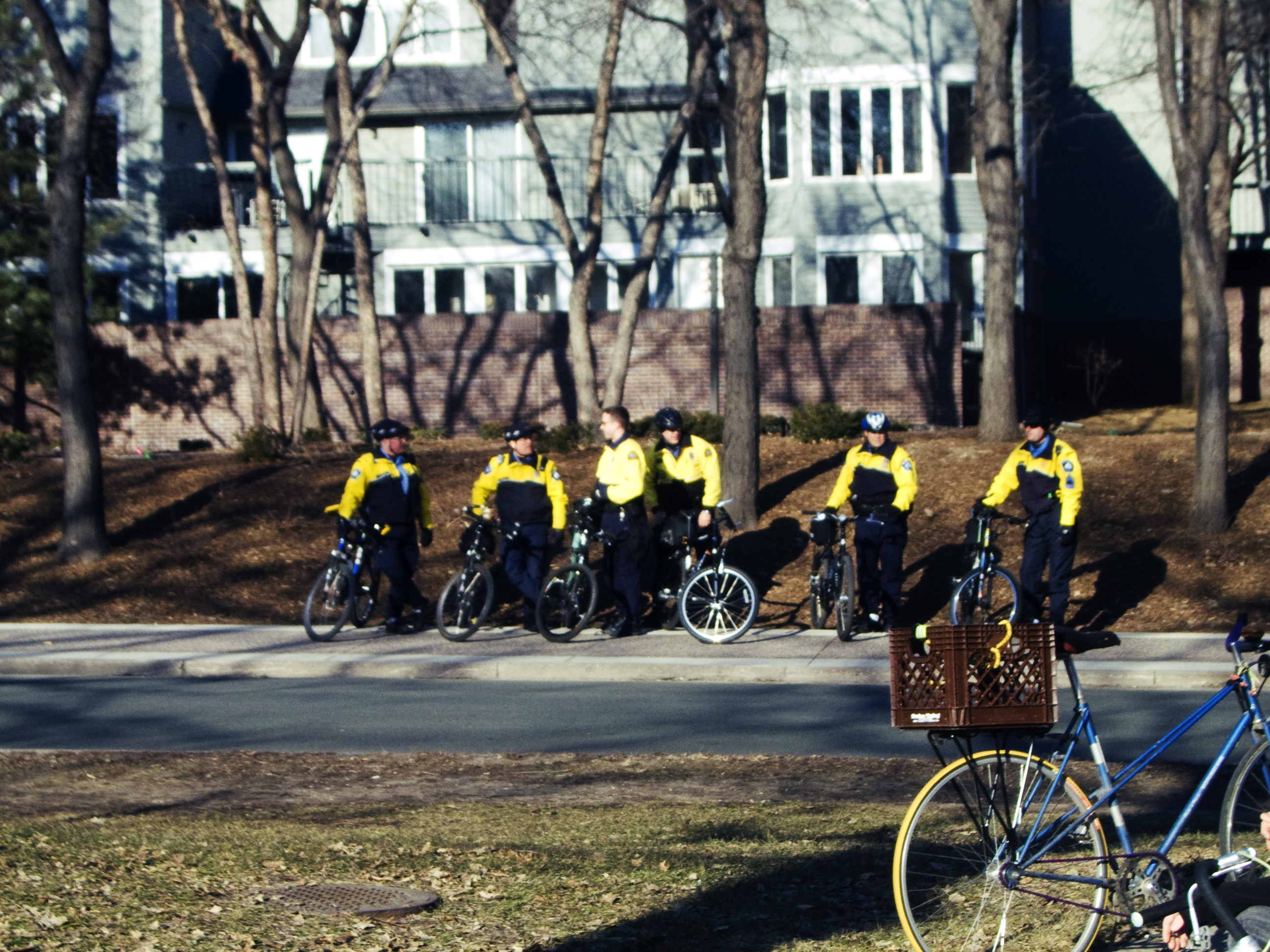
Bike patrol unit

- Police Activities League (PAL)
- Special Events/Reserve
- Strategic Operations Unit
- Special Weapons and Tactics (SWAT)

The Special Weapons and Tactics team responds to barricaded suspects, sniper situations, hostage incidents and large civil disturbances. The SWAT team also serves high-risk arrest or search warrants.

- Traffic Enforcement and Accident Investigation
- Traffic Control
- Intelligence Sharing and Information Center

=== Investigations Bureau ===
The Investigations Bureau performs comprehensive investigative services, including case management, suspect criteria, victim support and preparation of evidence for court. The bureau is composed of the Criminal Investigations Division, Crime Lab and Support Services.

Criminal Investigations Division

- License Investigations Unit: investigates applicants for business licenses and permits and helps monitor and regulate the operation of these businesses.
- Assault Unit: investigates cases involving first, second, third and fourth Degree Assault (significant bodily harm) or greater
- Family Violence Unit: has three investigative sections, Domestic Assault, Child Abuse and Vulnerable Adults.
- Forgery/Fraud Unit: investigates financial crimes consisting of forgery, financial transaction card fraud, theft by swindle, identity theft, and embezzlement.
- Homicide Unit: investigates murder, kidnappings, fatal accidents, drug overdoses, suicides and attempted suicides.
- Juvenile Unit: investigates robbery, assault and missing persons where the suspect or missing person is a juvenile.
- Robbery Unit
- Sex Crimes Unit: handles predatory offender registrations and coordinates Level III Sex Offender community notifications along with conducting sexual assault, child molestation, indecent exposure, luring and stalking investigations.
- Auto Theft Prevention (ATP) does undercover decoy and bait vehicle operations.
- Joint Terrorism Task Force (JTTF)
- Violent Criminal Apprehension Team (VCAT)
- Violent Offender Task Force (VOTF): works with the FBI to supports investigations by coordinating intelligence with a focus on arresting violent criminal suspects.
- Weapons Function: investigates the illegal carrying, selling and making of firearms. The unit also investigates unlawful discharge of a firearm.
- Precinct Investigations Unit: investigations unit investigates all property crime and adult missing persons.

=== Professional Standards Bureau ===
The Professional Standards Bureau focuses on the integrity of department employees from background screening through hiring and ongoing training and maintains the technical operations of the department. The bureau comprises the Background Unit, Internal Affairs, Mediation Compliance, Recruitment, Training, Business Technology Unit and Intellectual Properties. The bureau has three divisions the Administrative Services Division, Training Services Division and Internal Affairs Division.

- Business Technology
- Internal Affairs

The IAD investigates complaints against MPD employees.

- Backgrounds

The Backgrounds unit does background investigations on all potential employees for the Police Department, Fire Department and the Minneapolis Emergence Communications Center (MECC).

- Training

The Training Services Division runs the ACADEMY, FIELD TRAINING program, IN-SERVICE TRAINING and the Range.

=== Volunteer units and activities ===
The Minneapolis Police Reserve is a volunteer 60 non-sworn officer unit in charge of emergency preparedness, general public safety, and provides major support for traffic and crowd control. Officers are non-sworn and wear a light blue uniform with black slacks. Conceived after World War II as the civil defense force in anticipation of a nuclear attack during the Cold War, the reserve's role diminished after the Soviet-era. The unit's responsibility however was reaffirmed after the attacks of September 11, 2001 and was reassigned under the Minneapolis Police Department's Emergency Preparedness Coordinator, tasked with domestic defense in situations of civil unrest and disasters. Though officers are not on regular active patrols, they are on-call 24 hours and respond to rioting, protests, officer shootings, large crime scenes, fires and explosions, and natural disasters, as well as events requiring a security presence such as dignitaries and concerts. They also provide officers to traffic control.

The MPD also has other volunteer activities including

- Police Band
- Police Chaplain Corps
- Police Explorers
- Police Athletic League (PAL)
- Block Club Leaders
- Police Precinct Advisory Councils
- McGruff House Program
- Community Justice Project

=== Rank structure ===
Title	Insignia	Insignia (dress uniform cuff)
Chief of police		Broad gold stripe and two narrow gold stripes below gold star
Assistant chief		Broad gold stripe and narrow gold stripe below gold star
Deputy chief		Broad gold stripe
Inspector		Two narrow gold stripes
Commander and chaplain		Two narrow gold stripes
Lieutenant		Narrow gold stripe
Sergeant (20+ years of service)		
Sergeant (16–20 years of service)		
Sergeant (11–15 years of service)		
Sergeant (6–10 years of service)		
Sergeant (0–5 years of service)		
Police officer / investigator		

== Duty guns ==
Prior to 1988 MPD officers were authorized to carry a Colt or Smith & Wesson revolver in .38 or .357 caliber. From 1988 to 2002 MPD officers were authorized to carry Beretta or Smith & Wesson semiautomatics in 9mm or .45. In 2002 the .40 cal was authorized for use. In 2006 MPD officers were authorized to carry a Beretta, Smith & Wesson, H&K or SIG Sauer in 9mm, .40 or .45 in DA/SA only. From 2012 to 2015 MPD officers were authorized to carry only the Smith & Wesson M&P in 9mm or .45. From 2015 to present MPD officers are authorized to carry a Smith & Wesson M&P, SIG Sauer P320 or Glock in 9mm or .45 cal.

Off duty MPD officers are authorized to carry a Smith & Wesson J frame revolver or a Colt model D revolver. MPD officers are also authorized to carry any subcompact version of their duty gun.

All MPD officers are grandfathered in to carrying whatever gun was authorized when they were hired.

Officers were authorized to buy their own rifle and carry it on patrol if they wished from 2006 to 2015. Officers had to buy and carry the Smith & Wesson M&P 15X rifle. The city stopped this program in favor of having patrol rifle officers specially selected and trained to carry a rifle on patrol. The MPD uses the Remington Model 870 shotgun as their duty shotgun and the Colt model 6940 rifle as their duty rifle. Only 100 patrol officers are authorized and trained in the use of the duty rifle and carry it on patrol. The SWAT team uses the Colt M16A1 rifle, Colt model 6943 carbine and H&K MP5 SMG in 9mm or 40 cal. The SWAT team also uses the Accuracy International Arctic Warfare bolt action .308 rifle as their sniper rifle.

The MPD SWAT team uses OSS suppressors for their rifles, carbines and sniper rifles. The issued OSS suppressors are HX-QD 556k and HX-QD 762 suppressors.

== In popular culture ==
- In the fall of 1990, the department was featured on the first six episodes of Season 3 of the police reality show, COPS. The department was later featured in Season 21 of the show, which aired in 2008 and 2009.

== Other agencies ==
Five other police forces operate in Minneapolis with the Minneapolis Police Department being the largest.

- The University of Minnesota Police Department (UMPD) serves the University of Minnesota's Twin Cities campus. The department employs more than fifty sworn officers. The chief of police is Matt Clark, the former assistant chief of the Minneapolis Police Department. Under Clark's watch, the UMPD increased its cooperation with the Minneapolis Police Department, frequently responding to Minneapolis' calls for service and backing up MPD officers in need of assistance. After the murder of George Floyd, the university said it would no longer contract with MPD for additional large-event security assistance, including the K-9 bomb squad.
- The Minneapolis Park Police Department had thirty sworn patrol officers and twenty part-time park patrol agents as of 2020 who are responsible for law enforcement in city parks.
- The Metro Transit Police Department (officially Metropolitan Transit Police) patrols bus routes and light rail and as of 2023 had over 100 full time police officers.
- The Metropolitan Airports Commission has a police force.
- The Hennepin County Sheriff's Office with 800 licensed and civilian members is headquartered in Minneapolis.

== See also ==
- George Floyd protests in Minneapolis–Saint Paul
- List of law enforcement agencies in Minnesota
- List of Minneapolis Chiefs of Police
- Organized crime in Minneapolis
