= Spike Moss (activist) =

American activist against police brutality

- Born: 1945 or 1946 (age 80–81)
- Occupation: Activist

Harry "Spike" Moss is a community activist in Minneapolis, Minnesota. He has organized against police brutality and "Minnesota racism". The Associated Press state that he is a "civil rights leader"; Moss describes himself as a "freedom fighter".

== Life and activism ==
Moss was born in Paris, Missouri, and was raised in the "Jim Crow South".

Along with Mahmoud El-Kati and Verlena Matey-Keke, Moss helped co-found The Way, a non-profit community center for Black youth. Moss ran the recreation department, organizing activities for youth living in Northside Minneapolis. Moss was the final director of The Way when it closed in 1984. The Way founders saw themselves as part of the Black Power movement.

In 1992, Moss helped form United For Peace, which brought gang members together with the Minneapolis Police Department in an effort to decrease gang violence. The program was ended after the killing of MPD officer Jerry Haaf by members of the Vice Lords gang.

Moss watched the verdict for the Derek Chauvin trial with George Floyd's family, saying "we finally won one."

In 2024, a section of Minneapolis street was named Spike Moss Way in his honor.
