= Liz Lee (politician) =

American politician

Member of the Minnesota House of Representatives from the 67A district
- Incumbent
- Assumed office January 3, 2023
- Preceded by: John Thompson

Personal details
- Born: St. Paul, Minnesota, U.S.
- Party: Democratic (DFL)
- Education: Yale University (BA)
- Occupation: Legislator
- Website: Government website Campaign website

Kaozouapa Elizabeth "Liz" Lee (RPA: Nkauj Zuag Paj Lis, Pahawh: 𖬄𖬲𖬢 𖬑𖬶𖬥𖬰 𖬖𖬲𖬪𖬵 𖬃𖬲𖬞) is an American politician serving in the Minnesota House of Representatives since 2023. A member of the Minnesota Democratic-Farmer-Labor Party (DFL), Lee represents District 67A in the Twin Cities metropolitan area, including parts of Saint Paul in Ramsey County.

== Early life, career, and education ==
Lee was born to Hmong refugees who emigrated to the United States from a Thai refugee camp after being displaced from Laos. She was raised in public housing on the east side of Saint Paul, Minnesota, where she delivered papers for the Eastside Review. In high school, she worked as a House aide to state representative Tim Mahoney.

Lee earned a Bachelor of Arts degree in political science from Yale University. She worked as a staffer for U.S. Senator Amy Klobuchar, U.S. Representative Barbara Lee, and U.S. Representative Keith Ellison. She worked as a nonprofit consultant before being elected to the state legislature.

== Minnesota House of Representatives ==
Lee was elected to the Minnesota House of Representatives in 2022. In the DFL primary she defeated one-term incumbent John Thompson, who was expelled from the DFL House caucus in 2021 amid domestic abuse allegations.

Lee serves as vice chair of the Property Tax Division of the Taxes Committee and as an assistant majority leader of the House DFL caucus. She also sits on the Children and Families Finance and Policy, Education Policy, and Taxes Committees. Lee is a member of the House People of Color and Indigenous (POCI) Caucus and the Minnesota Asian and Pacific (MAP) Caucus.

=== Political positions ===
Lee ran on a platform of rent stabilization, well-paying jobs, infrastructure, and health equity. She joined a group of Minnesota legislators in urging the U.S. Census Bureau to reclassify several Asian ethnicities, including Hmong, saying the bureau "didn't do proper stakeholder engagement" with the Asian community. At a press conference on anti-Asian hate crimes, Lee said she and the MAP Caucus would push for further gun regulations.

== Electoral history ==
2022 DFL Primary - Minnesota State House - District 67A
Party	Candidate	Votes	%
Democratic (DFL)	Liz Lee	2,168	88.93
Democratic (DFL)	John Thompson	270	11.07
Total votes		2,438	100.0

2022 Minnesota State House - District 67A
Party	Candidate	Votes	%
Democratic (DFL)	Liz Lee	6,320	75.13
Republican	Scott Hesselgrave	2,077	24.69
Write-in		15	0.18
Total votes		8,412	100.0
Democratic (DFL) hold			

2024 Minnesota State House - District 67A
Party	Candidate	Votes	%
Republican	Scott Hesselgrave	3,178	25.74
Democratic (DFL)	Liz Lee (incumbent)	9,133	73.96
Write-in		37	0.30
Total votes		12,348	100.00
Democratic (DFL) hold			

== Personal life ==
Lee lives in Saint Paul, Minnesota and identifies as Hmong.
