= Bob Kroll (police officer) =

Former American police officer

- Born: Robert J. Kroll; 1965 (age 60–61)
- Known for: Former President of the Police Officers Federation of Minneapolis
- Spouse: Liz Collin
- Police career
- Department: Minneapolis Police Department
- Service years: 1989–2021
- Status: Retired
- Rank: Lieutenant

Robert J. Kroll (born c. 1965) is an American former police officer and member of the Minneapolis Police Department. He was the president of the Police Officers Federation of Minneapolis, the police union for the police department, from 2015 to 2021. Over the course of his career, Kroll was involved in three officer-involved shootings, had 20 internal affairs complaints, and was the subject of several lawsuits. Kroll has been a longtime opponent to reforms of the police department, including calls to address racial bias within the force and reduce the number of people killed by police. Kroll has generated controversy on a number of occasions. In particular, his comments following the murder of George Floyd in May 2020 resulted in calls for his resignation, including from a number of unions, several former mayors of Minneapolis, and a former police chief.

On January 11, 2021, Kroll announced his retirement at the end of January 2021.

== Career ==
=== Police force and union leadership ===
Kroll joined the Minneapolis Police Department in 1989. He was on the department's SWAT team for 15 years, and served in the vice unit, public housing unit, and as head of the domestic violence unit. He was promoted to sergeant in 1994, elected to the board of the Police Officers Federation of Minneapolis in 1996, and named vice president in 2006. He won his first two-year term as president of the union in May 2015. As head of the federation and its approximately 800 members, Kroll advocated for additional police officers and additional autonomy for the police.

During his career, Kroll was involved in three officer shootings. By 2015, Kroll had accumulated 20 internal affairs complaints, three of which led to discipline, including the one that led to his demotion.

=== Actions and controversies ===
==== 1990s ====
In 1994, Kroll received a five-day suspension for excessive use of force that was later overturned. A 1995 lawsuit against Kroll in federal court alleged that he had used racial slurs while beating, choking and kicking a 15-year-old multi-racial boy. The lawsuit was unsuccessful. Kroll oversaw a botched Emergency Response Unit drug raid in 1996 where an officer was shot by friendly fire.

==== 2000s ====
During a no-knock raid on an elderly couple's residence in September 2002, Kroll was among several officers accused of using excessive force. A lawsuit regarding the incident was settled for $60,000. In March 2003 Kroll was involuntarily demoted for ethical violations. He had his rank reinstated three months later. A City of Minneapolis attorney recommended settling a lawsuit for $15,000 stemming from Kroll kicking and beating a suspect at an impound lot in February 2004. While off-duty in May 2004, Kroll and another officer assaulted several people at an art crawl in northeast Minneapolis. After a man allegedly bumped up against their vehicle, Kroll and the other officer, dressed in plain clothes, punched him, throwing him on the sidewalk and hitting his head on the ground. They taunted bystanders and then punched the man's sister and kicked another person in the face. A complaint about the incident was sustained by the Civilian Review Authority and Kroll was suspended for 20 days. One month later, during a departmental ethics class, Kroll allegedly said that then-Congressman Keith Ellison, a Muslim, was a terrorist. He also used a homophobic slur against a gay staffer to mayor R. T. Rybak, resulting in his suspension.

In 2007, Kroll was named in a racial discrimination lawsuit brought against the city of Minneapolis by five black officers, including police officer Medaria Arradondo who later became police chief. The lawsuit described Kroll as having "a history of discriminatory attitudes and conduct," and alleged that he wore a motorcycle jacket that had a white power patch. The lawsuit also asserted that Kroll was racially discriminatory in overtime assignments following the I-35W bridge collapse.

==== 2010s ====
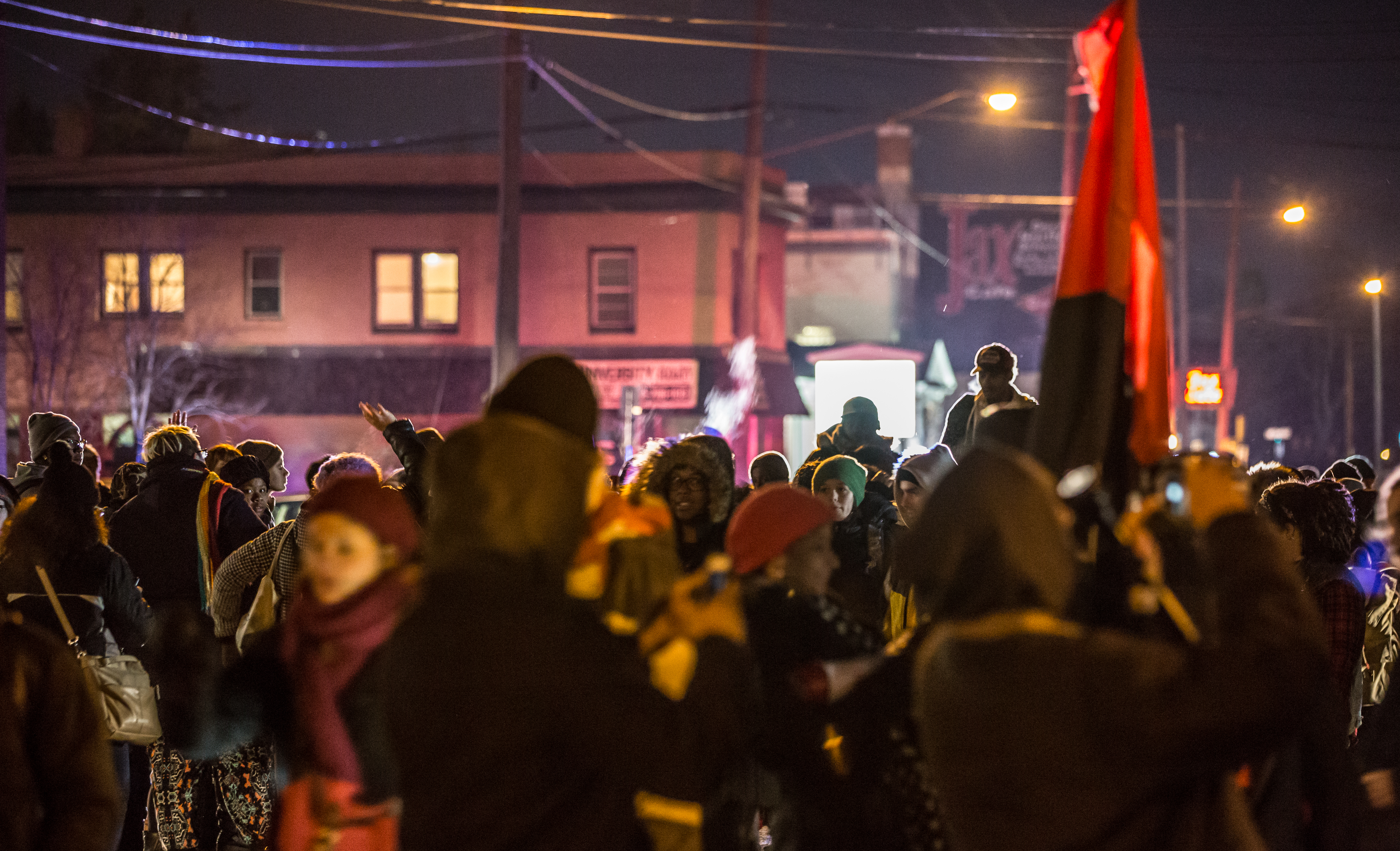
Black Lives Matter protest outside the Minneapolis police federation building on December 3, 2015

Kroll has referred to the Black Lives Matter movement as a "terrorist organization." He was critical of the responses of then-mayor Betsy Hodges and police chief Janeé Harteau, who said that his views were "not consistent with 21st-century policing."

In 2016, after officers walked off a job at a Minnesota Lynx game over jerseys that said "Black Lives Matter," Kroll said that he commended the four officers, saying that Lynx games had "such a pathetic draw." In July 2016, an email from police chief Harteau to Kroll was leaked to the press in which Harteau ordered Kroll to wear his police uniform only for department-sanctioned purposes, which did not include his capacity as a union representative.

During the grand jury investigation of the shooting of Justine Damond in 2018, Kroll challenged Hennepin County Attorney Michael O. Freeman's efforts to gather testimony from officers. Later that year, Kroll pushed back against requirements that police department squad cars have placards informing immigrants of their rights.

In 2019, following a ban on "warrior-style" training for police officers by mayor Jacob Frey, Kroll called the directive unlawful and announced that the union would offer free warrior-style training for officers as long as Frey remains in office.

==== 2020s ====
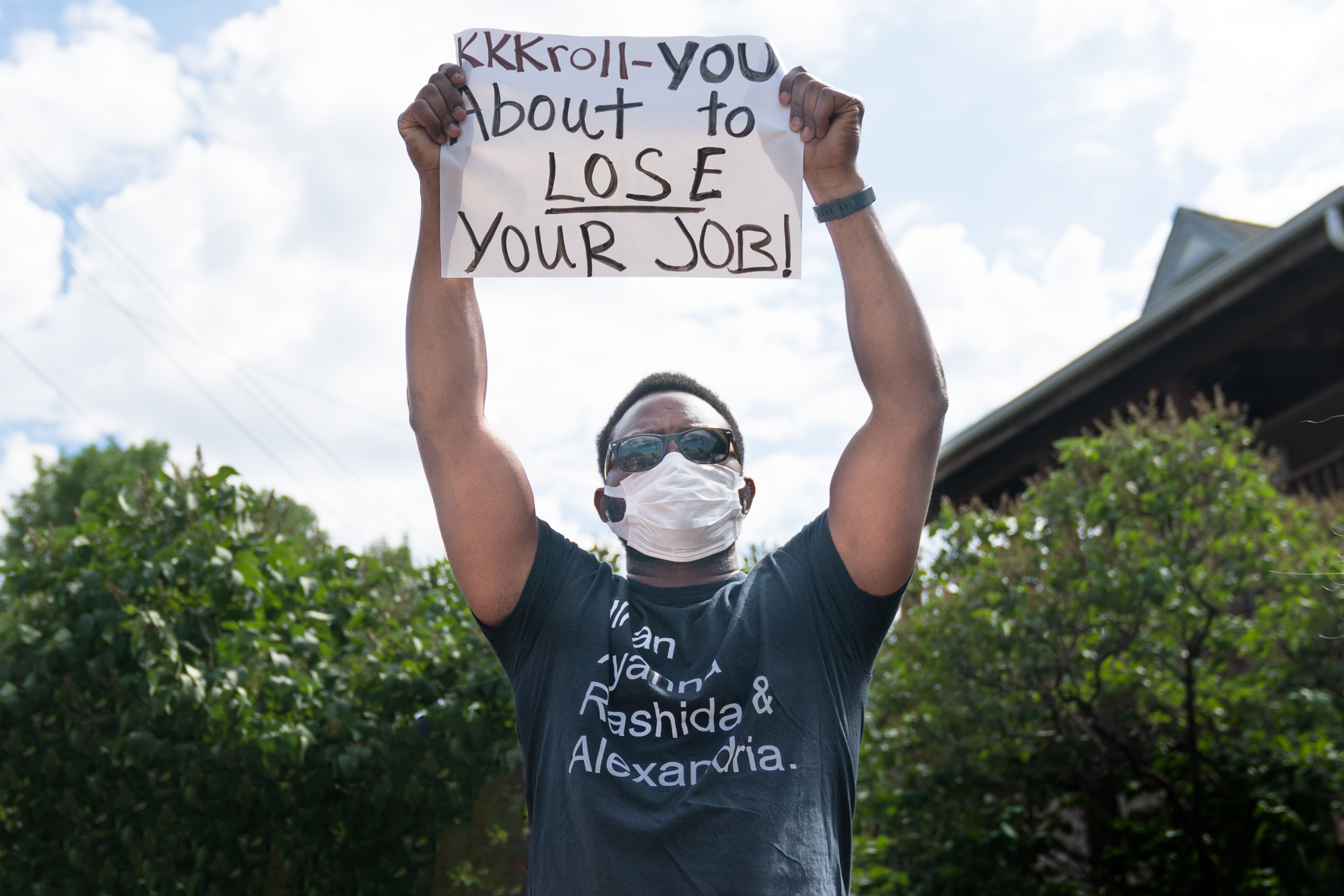
A protester holds a sign at the Minneapolis police federation on June 12, 2020

Following the murder of George Floyd in May 2020, Kroll characterized Floyd as a "violent criminal" and called the protests a "terrorist movement" in a letter to fellow police union members. Kroll came under intense criticism in the wake of his comments. Minnesota AFL–CIO President Bill McCarthy criticized Kroll in June 2020 for "a long history of bigoted remarks and complaints of violence made against him" toward black residents. McCarthy, Education Minnesota (the state's teachers union), and former Minneapolis Chief of Police Janeé Harteau called for Kroll's resignation. Harteau said Kroll's behavior during the George Floyd protests was a "disgrace to the badge." Former Minneapolis mayor R. T. Rybak called Kroll "overtly racist" and "a cancer on this police department, on this city."

Kroll received widespread public attention in protests over Floyd's murder. Demonstrators called for his resignation at a rally outside the Minneapolis federation on July 12, 2020. Minneapolis civil rights activist Nekima Levy Armstrong said in a speech, "Bob Kroll is as racist as they come! And his evil has been allowed to fester inside the Minneapolis Police Department!" A number of protests focused specifically on having Kroll removed from his positions, among other calls for police reform and police abolition.

In a letter published May 27, 2020, the Metropolitan Urban Indian Directors Group, a coalition of 30 American Indian organizations, called for Kroll's termination. The Minnesota Nurses Association also called for his resignation on the same day. Minnesota House of Representatives speaker Melissa Hortman and Minneapolis City Council member Steve Fletcher also called on Kroll to resign.

A 100-person protest group led by Levy Armstrong's Racial Justice Network gathered outside Kroll's home in Hugo, Minnesota on August 15, 2020, to call for his resignation from the Minneapolis police union. Protesters also criticized Kroll's wife, WCCO television reporter Liz Collin, asserting she had a conflict of interest in stories about police violence. Remarks by John Thompson, a Minnesota Democratic-Farmer-Labor candidate for the state legislature from St. Paul, drew controversy. Thompson said in his speech, "You think we give a [expletive] about burning Hugo down?" and also "[Expletive] Hugo." The event also featured the bashing of piñata effigies of Kroll and Collin. Several local media members condemned the symbolic display of violence against a woman journalist. Language used at the event was condemned by leaders of the Minnesota Democratic-Farmer-Labor and Republican parties, and led to an apology from Thompson.

==== Ban from metro county policing ====
In 2023, Kroll was banned from serving as a law enforcement officer in three of the state's most populous metro counties for 10 years, as a result of a successful lawsuit from the Minnesota ACLU. The lawsuit accused Minneapolis police of unconstitutional brutality in response to demonstrations following the murder of George Floyd, and forced the Minneapolis City Council to pay out more that $700,000 in settlement money. The settlement agreement stated that Kroll cannot serve as a licensed police officer or in a leadership role in any policing agencies in Hennepin, Ramsey or Anoka counties for a decade. He is also barred from being a board member, director, officer or staff member or member of the state board that licenses officers.

In 2024, Kroll sought President-elect Donald Trump's nomination to be Minnesota's next U.S. marshal.

== Political views ==
Kroll supported and endorsed President Donald Trump. He spoke at an October 2019 Trump rally in Minneapolis and was featured in a 2020 Trump campaign ad. Kroll also sold "Cops for Trump" shirts, an act that generated concerns about political bias in the police force. According to Minneapolis deputy chief Art Knight, Kroll subscribes to the "broken windows" theory of policing.

== Personal life ==
Kroll grew up on the East Side of Saint Paul, Minnesota. His father was in a union. During a bar fight when he was off-duty, Kroll had part of his ear bitten off.

Kroll is married to Liz Collin, a news anchor for ViacomCBS–owned CBS station WCCO-TV. This relationship has been claimed to be a conflict of interest, as Collin has routinely covered police matters for WCCO since 2013. In June 2020, protests were held outside WCCO's downtown offices, calling on Collin to resign from her post; WCCO responded that Collin had not reported on police issues for at least two and a half years in response to public pressure over the relationship.
