= Tim Mahoney (Minnesota politician) =

American politician

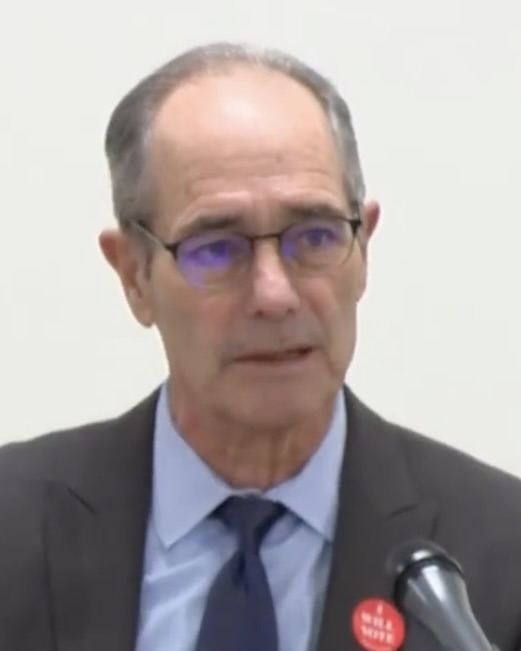

Member of the Minnesota House of Representatives from the 67A district
- In office January 5, 1999 – January 5, 2021
- Preceded by: Jim Farrell
- Succeeded by: John Thompson

Personal details
- Born: September 21, 1953 (age 73) Saint Paul, Minnesota
- Party: Minnesota Democratic–Farmer–Labor Party
- Spouse: Susan Bishop
- Children: 2
- Education: Saint Paul Technical College
- Occupation: pipefitter, legislator

Tim Mahoney (born September 21, 1953) is a Minnesota politician and member of the Minnesota House of Representatives. A member of the Minnesota Democratic–Farmer–Labor Party (DFL), he represented District 67A, which includes all or portions of the Saint Paul Greater East Side, Payne-Phalen, Hayden Heights, Frost Lake, Hillcrest and Phalen Village neighborhoods in Ramsey County, which is in the Twin Cities metropolitan area.

== Early life, education, and career ==
Mahoney is the fifth child of Francis and Eleanor Mahoney. He was raised on the East Side of Saint Paul, graduating in 1971 from Harding High School. He attended Saint Paul Technical College to become a union pipefitter.

== Minnesota House of Representatives ==
Mahoney was first elected to the House in 1998, when incumbent Rep. Jim Farrell ran for Ramsey County Attorney. He defeated fellow DFLers Michele Ford, a legislative staffer, and Brian McMahon, a housing specialist, in the 1998 DFL primary election; he went on to defeat Republican Julie Glanz and Reform candidate Andy Lamotte in the general election. He has been re-elected every two years since then.

He chaired the Finance Subcommittee for the Higher Education and Workforce Development Finance and Policy Division and Bioscience and Workforce Development Policy and Oversight Division during the 2009–2010 biennium, and the Biosciences and Emerging Technology Committee during the 2007–2008 biennium.

Minnesota House of Representatives
Preceded by Jim Farrell	Member of the House of Representatives from the 67A district 1999–present	Incumbent
