= Reclaim the Block =

- Formation: 2018
- Type: grassroots

Reclaim the Block is a grassroots organization founded in 2018 and based in Minneapolis, Minnesota, United States. The group organized protest and started petitions to pressure the Minneapolis City Council to divest money from the Minneapolis Police Department to be spent instead on subsidized housing, addiction resources, youth homelessness causes and crime prevention programs. They also invest in these causes. Instead of the police department, the group support community-based safety initiatives.

In some cases, the group has been partially successful in its lobbying for divestment of the police department's budget. In December 2018, $1 million planned for the police department was instead allocated to violence prevention programs, including youth violence prevention programs and support for survivors of domestic violence. However, Reclaim the Block had advocated a $9 million divestment.

After global protests beginning in late May 2020 following the murder of George Floyd, the Minneapolis City Council announced at a rally jointly held by Reclaim the Block and the Black Visions Collective their intent to disband the Minneapolis Police Department. After a surge in donations, the Minnesota Freedom Fund recommended Reclaim the Block on June 2, 2020 as an alternate organization to donate to.

== See also ==
- George Floyd protests in Minneapolis–Saint Paul
- 2021 Minneapolis Question 2
