= Brian O'Hara =

American police chief in Minneapolis

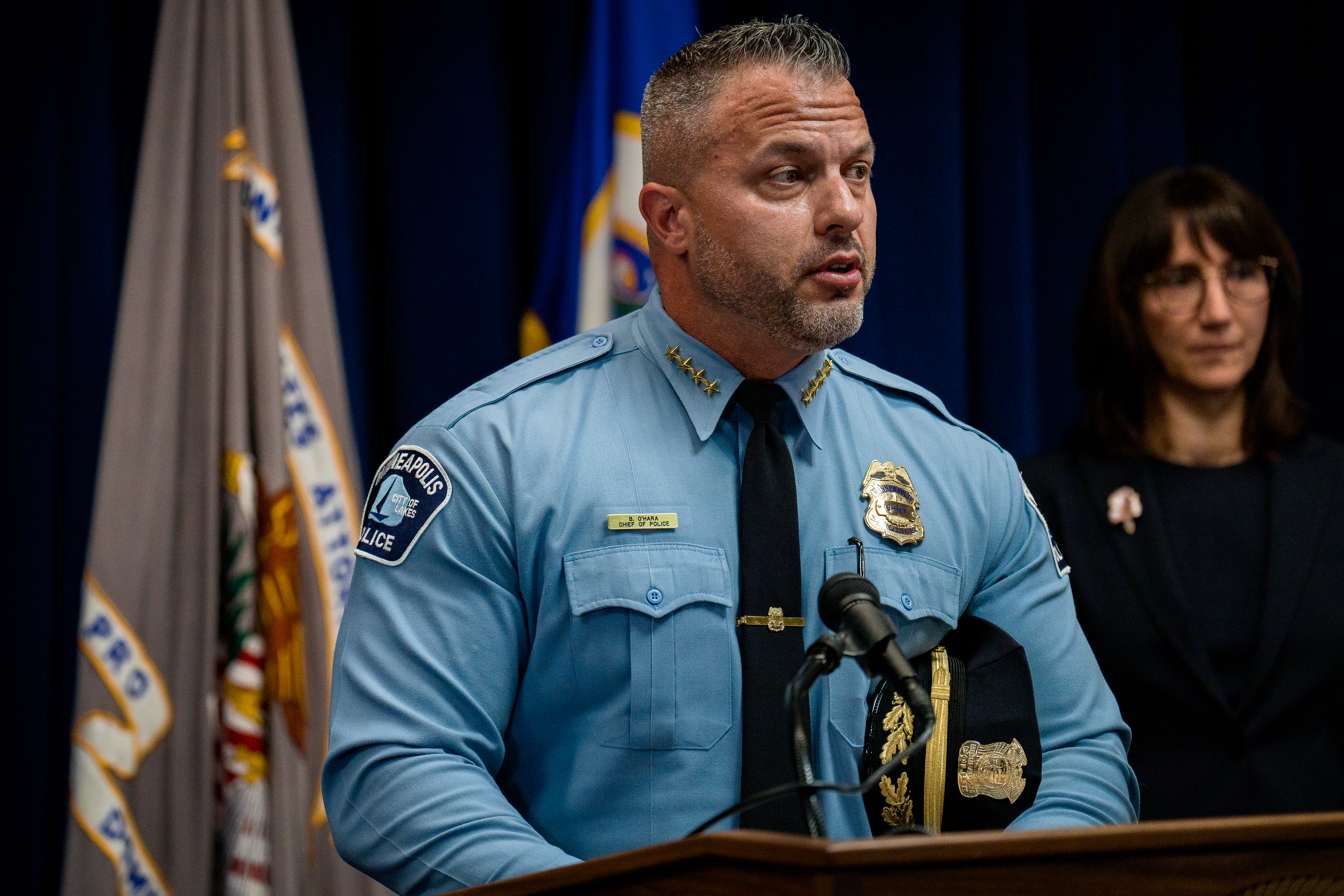
- O'Hara in 2023

54th Chief of the Minneapolis Police Department
- In office November 7, 2022 – May 26, 2026
- Appointed by: Jacob Frey
- Preceded by: Medaria Arradondo

Deputy Mayor of Newark
- In office July 1, 2022 – October 31, 2022 Serving with Rahman Muhammad, Jackie Quiles, and Allison Ladd
- Appointed by: Ras Baraka
- Succeeded by: N/A

Director of the Newark Department of Public Safety
- In office February 16, 2021 – June 30, 2022
- Appointed by: Ras Baraka
- Succeeded by: Raul Malave (interim)

Personal details
- Born: 1979 (age 46–47) Belleville, New Jersey, U.S.
- Party: Democratic
- Children: 2
- Education: Rutgers University–Newark (BS, MA)
- Police career
- Service years: Minneapolis Police Department (2022–2026); Newark Department of Public Safety (2021–2022) Newark Police Department (2001–2021)
- Rank: Chief of Police; November 2022; Deputy Mayor, Newark; July 2021; Public Safety Director; February 2021; Deputy Chief of Police; January 2020; Captain; September 2017; Lieutenant; March 2011; Sergeant; January 2006; Police Officer; August 2001

Brian O'Hara (born 1979) is an American law enforcement administrator who was the chief of the Minneapolis Police Department from November 2022 until his resignation in May 2026. Previously in Newark, New Jersey, he served as deputy mayor of Newark from July to October 2022, as director of the Newark Department of Public Safety from February 2021 to June 2022, and sworn in as a Newark police officer in 2001.

== Early life and education ==
Born in Belleville, New Jersey, O'Hara was raised in Kearny, New Jersey, as one of two siblings. His father died while he was a child, and he was raised by his mother. He attended Kearny High School and graduated in 1997. He lived in Newark, New Jersey, for twelve years, and received undergraduate and graduate degrees in criminal justice from Rutgers University–Newark. While at Rutgers, he received the Richard J. Hughes Award for having achieved the highest academic standing. He holds a graduate certificate in criminal justice education from the University of Virginia.

O'Hara completed the Harvard Kennedy School's program for Senior Executives in State and Local Government. He is a graduate of the 240th Session of the FBI National Academy and of the 54th Session of the Senior Management Institute for Police at Boston University, O'Hara was also a certified public manager and police academy instructor.

== Career ==
=== Newark Police Division ===
O'Hara was sworn in as a Newark police officer in 2001 and began as a patrol officer in the city's West District, serving in the Vailsburg Task Force and Safe City Task Force. As a sergeant, he worked as a field supervisor in the North District and the Office of Policy and Planning. As a lieutenant, he was the North District Executive Officer and served as a special assistant to the Police Director. He commanded the Metro Division and Traffic Unit.

In 2017, O'Hara was promoted to captain and appointed to oversee the implementation of a federal consent decree mandating the City of Newark reform its policies and training around police use of force, civilian oversight, supervision, internal affairs, and procedures for stops, searches, and arrests. He was known to lead town hall meetings to obtain community input for reforming police policies, and he was credited by the independent federal monitor for the "unprecedented progress with policy development, drafting new policies required by the Consent Decree, and proposing revisions to some of its current policies to meet Consent Decree standards."

Peter Harvey, who served as the first African-American Attorney General of New Jersey, attributed the success of Newark's compliance with a federal consent decree to reform the Newark Police Department to O'Hara. He acknowledged that some supervisors retired as they struggled to keep up with the pace of change. Furthermore, Harvey recognized O'Hara's efforts in implementing policies that went beyond the requirements of the agreement, which resulted in significant progress in the police force's reform in Newark.

From 2020 until being appointed Public Safety Director, O'Hara served as deputy chief and Commander of the Accountability, Engagement, and Oversight Bureau of the Newark Police Division. This Bureau comprises the Office of Professional Standards (Internal Affairs); Consent Decree and Planning Division; Training Division; Firearms Range; Community & Clergy Affairs Unit, Technology Unit, Compliance Unit; All Force Investigation & Tracking Team (AFIT); Risk Management Unit, Advocate Unit, and the Candidate Investigations Unit.

=== Newark Public Safety Director ===
By February 16, 2021, when Newark Mayor Ras Baraka tapped O'Hara to serve as Newark's Public Safety Director, O'Hara was already well known in community and law enforcement circles as someone who had spent years working on police reform and building community trust. In this role, O'Hara was the chief executive officer of the Division of Police, Division of Fire, Office of Emergency Management and Homeland Security, and the city's 9-1-1 emergency communications center. O'Hara managed a $244-million budget and had oversight of more than 2,000 employees, including 1,000 sworn police officers, 650 firefighters, and 350 civilian employees.

During his tenure as Newark Public Safety Director, O'Hara was credited with leading police reform efforts, enhancing collaborative partnerships, and reducing the amount of gun violence in Newark.

=== Minneapolis Police Department Chief ===
On September 29, 2022, O'Hara was nominated by Minneapolis Mayor Jacob Frey to succeed Chief Medaria Arradondo as the 54th chief of the Minneapolis Police Department. O'Hara was the first police chief to be appointed in Minneapolis after the murder of George Floyd. O'Hara was selected by Mayor Frey after a search committee referred three candidates for consideration following a national search. After O'Hara toured the city and met with stakeholders and community organizations, O'Hara's nomination was unanimously confirmed by the Minneapolis City Council on November 3, 2022.

The first outsider appointed to lead the department in 16 years, O'Hara was sworn in as the 54th Chief of the Minneapolis Police Department at a private ceremony in Minneapolis City Hall on November 8, 2022, before being welcomed at a multi-cultural community event hosted by Bishop Howell at Shiloh Temple International Ministries in North Minneapolis.

One of O'Hara's major initiatives as Minneapolis police chief has been to curb the use of force by the Minneapolis police department. O'Hara serves as a regular featured speaker at MPD's DC Police Leadership Academy.

In 2023, O'Hara hired a professional to write his Wikipedia page.

On January 18, 2026, O'Hara revealed in an interview which to 60 Minutes that U.S. Immigration and Customs Enforcement (ICE) crackdowns in Minneapolis were also targeting off-duty Minneapolis Police Department officers.

==== Public Safety Initiatives ====
In 2023, the MPD partnered with the U.S. Department of Justice as part of the National Public Safety Partnership initiative, providing officers with training and technical assistance. This partnership, which includes federal oversight, is unprecedented in U.S. history. In December 2024, the DOJ hosted the National Public Safety Partnership Summit in Minneapolis, bringing over 500 federal, state and local law enforcement executives to Minneapolis to share experiences about what is working to reduce violent crime while rebuilding trust in communities.

==== Crime Statistics and Operations ====
"Operation Safe Summer" is an initiative by the Minneapolis Police Department aimed at addressing crime hotspots in the city by increasing law enforcement presence. During this operation, both uniformed and undercover officers are deployed in specific areas known for higher crime rates, such as the North Side, downtown, and along East Lake Street. The operation has reported positive outcomes, with a 33% decrease in homicides and 37% fewer gunshot victims in the first half of 2023 compared to the previous year, alongside an 18% increase in gun seizures.

==== Staffing and Budget Concerns ====
In 2023, Chief Brian O'Hara expressed concerns regarding the lowest staffing levels in years for the Minneapolis Police Department, with the city's budget providing for 731 sworn officers, a number mandated by law, while only 564 were available for street duty. The MPD faced a $1 million budget cut from the proposed $195 million (0.05%), resulting in the loss of several civilian positions. Adjustments included reallocating funds for immigration services, supporting a city attorney's office position, and community safety projects. Mayor Jacob Frey noted the importance of proper resourcing for the department amid the budget cuts. However, the budget was not cut; it was increased to $194 million from the last year's budget of $187 million.

== Personal life ==
O'Hara was raised Catholic.

He is married to Wafiyyah O'Hara.

He was accused of inappropriate sexual relationships with three female subordinates in the MPD.

== See also ==
- Newark Police Department
- List of Minneapolis Chiefs of Police
- Police abolition movement in Minneapolis
