= Minnesota Freedom Fund =

U.S. non-profit organization

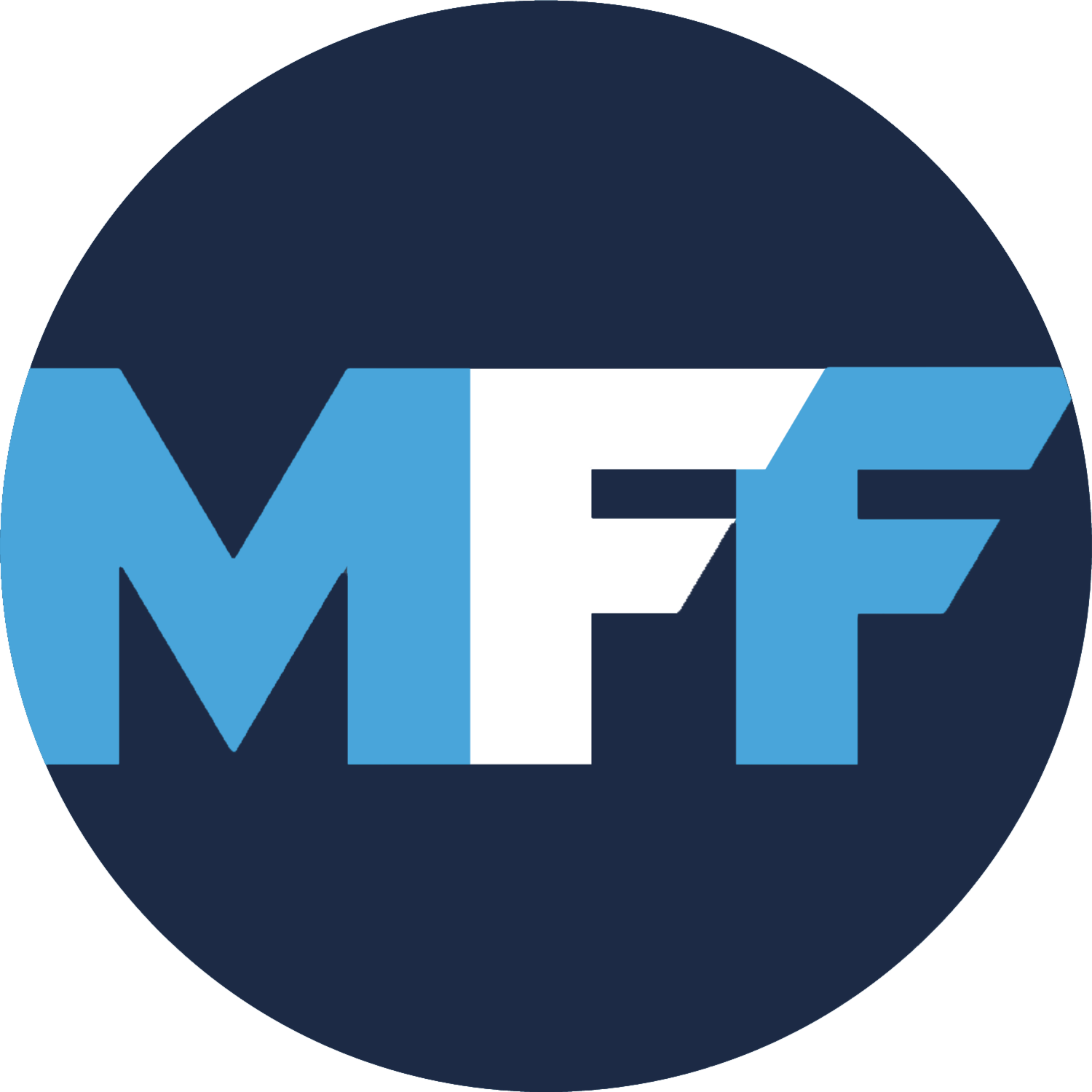
- Formation: 2016; 10 years ago
- Founder: Simon Cecil
- Type: 501(c)(3)
- Location: Minneapolis, Minnesota, U.S.
- Website: mnfreedomfund.org

Minnesota Freedom Fund is a nonprofit organization based in the U.S. city of Minneapolis. The organization works to dismantle wealth-based detention, reform courts, and uphold community power in the voting booth.

== History ==
Minnesota Freedom Fund (MFF) is a nonprofit organization that was founded in 2016 and is based in the U.S. city of Minneapolis. From 2016 to 2025, the organization operated a bail fund, paying bail for people who had been arrested and were awaiting trial. Initially a small organization with a $100,000 in financial assets by 2017, the organization raised $40 million in 2020, following the murder of George Floyd. By May 2021, the organization had spent $19 million largely on posting bail for local cases. Money returned to the organization when a person appeared in court and it was reallocated to other bail posts. The organization did not make bail determinations based on the types of crimes allegedly committed and the posting of bond was made without details of a particular case. Leaders of the organization have expressed support for the abolition of all bail fees.

=== Strategic Shift ===
In 2025, MFF underwent an organizational shift to respond to systemic issues behind wealth-based detention. Transitioning from its origins as a bail fund, the organization now implements programming focused on systemic intervention while working with community partners to dismantle the systems that turn poverty into punishment, reform courts, and uphold community power in the voting booth.

=== Founding ===
The Minnesota Freedom Fund was founded in 2016 by Simon Cecil, a graduate student at the University of Minnesota who received a $5,000 grant through the university's Carlson School of Management and a further $5,000 from a business competition, the Acara Challenge. By April 2017, the organization reported having posted bail for 33 people, all but two of whom had attended their trial. In 2018, the fund paid $9,464 across 113 bail cases. It raised $100,000 in the fiscal year 2017–2018 period.

=== Slow expansion ===
By March 2020, the group reported having provided bail money in 500 cases, including a limited number of U.S. Immigration and Customs Enforcement detention centers. In early 2020, during the initial months of the COVID-19 pandemic in Minnesota, the group sought the release of more inmates, concerned about the virus spreading rapidly throughout the prison population. It removed its upper limit of $1,000 in bail payments. In May 2020, the organization's then executive director Tonja Honsey said that the average amount of money needed by recipients of the fund was $150. Bail amounts of $78, the surcharge cost of Hennepin County court fees, were also common.

Prior to May 2020, the organization had one full-time employee.

=== George Floyd protests and aftermath ===
Following the murder of George Floyd on May 25, 2020, and the subsequent protests, the fund received $20 million in donations over a four-day period, with public postings of donations to the group becoming popular on Twitter. Several public figures and celebrities—such as Kamala Harris, Steve Carell, Cynthia Nixon, and Seth Rogen—were among those praising the organization's mission on social media. Publications such as Rolling Stone and Vogue published articles promoting bail funds and how to contribute. On June 2, 2020, the group temporarily suspended further donations, suggesting that visitors to their website donate to the nonprofits Black Visions Collective, Reclaim the Block, Rebuild Lake Street, Northstar Health Collective, or West Broadway Business and Area Coalition. By September it had accumulated $35 million in donations, and its total for 2020 reached $40 million.

The organization said that they would prioritize bail for people who had been detained in connection with the George Floyd protests. Most of the people who were arrested during the late May and early June 2020 events in Minneapolis and Saint Paul were for curfew violations, and many were issued citations and quickly released. Around a dozen protesters had their bail posted by the Minnesota Freedom Fund, according its interim director, Greg Lewin. Among them, the organization posted the $75,000 bail for a 28-year old Saint Paul man who was charged with attempted second-degree murder for allegedly firing gunshots at Minneapolis police officers who were patrolling East Lake Street during the overnight hours of May 31.

About the large financial assets the organization amassed during protests following Floyd's murder, Jeffrey Clayton, executive director of the insurance company trade group American Bail Coalition, said later, "The purpose for what they got the money was not there."

=== Fund growth and distribution ===
The organization faced criticism on Twitter in mid-2020 for its mostly White executive board, and the small proportion of its recent income which had been distributed. In mid-2021 it went through arbitration due to turmoil between staff and the board. Simon Cecil, the founder, formally cut ties with the organization on May 31.

In September 2020, The Washington Post reported that 92% of people arrested in the locale within the fund's scope did not require monetary bail, and that the average bail paid by the group had increased from $342 to $13,195. In May 2021, the BBC said that they had spent $19 million of the money they received in 2020, but money returns to the organization when the people released on bail appear in court. The majority of their expenditures were local Minnesotan cases, but $4.5 million went to the National Bail Fund Network. One recipient of money from the Minnesota Freedom Fund attested that it paid for his bail, legal fees, and to pay for property damage that he was charged with after a Black Lives Matter protest he attended.

In 2020 and 2021, efforts in Minnesota were made to reduce inequities in the application of bail, but also to seek greater oversight of the Minnesota Freedom Fund. In December 2020, prosecutors in the Minnesota counties of Hennepin and Washington stopped seeking bail for people charged with nonviolent felonies, which the use of bail had disproportionately effect on people of color. In the 2021 Minnesota Legislative Session, some lawmakers proposed legislation to require bail funds to make public the person or organization that posts bail for certain violent crimes, and to prohibit bail funds from posting bail for people charged with violent crimes or had a prior conviction for violent crime. By May 2021, the organization had distributed $19 million for more than 900 criminal and immigration bonds.

According to then-leader Greg Lewin in 2020, the bail fund "do not make determinations of bail support based on the crimes that individuals are alleged to have committed". Co-executive director Mirella Ceja-Orozco had said that the organization does not "judge whether the person had committed a crime or not because that's what the courts are for." The fund has drawn criticism for some of the people it bailed out. A 32-year-old man from Minneapolis who was bailed out of jail by the organization in July 2020 after an alleged assault, was charged in connection to another alleged assault in August. By August 2020, the organization had paid the $100,000 bail for a person accused of second-degree murder and the $350,000 bail for a person accused of sexual assault and kidnapping. In February 2021, Hennepin County Attorney Michael O. Freeman criticized the organization for twice bailing out a man with pending charges for weapons and rioting charges, and a judge set a bail threshold for the man above what the organization typically pays. According to the National Review, the fund was also used to bail out people accused of violent crimes and people with prior convictions for sexual assault.

A 29-year old man from Blaine, Minnesota, was arrested and charged by authorities for his role in several protests and riots in 2020. He twice had his bail paid for by the Minnesota Freedom Fund and was released from law enforcement custody. Authorities alleged that he was responsible for vandalizing a Minneapolis police station on August 15, 2020, possessing unauthorized weapons and damaging property inside the Hennepin County Government Center building on October 15, 2020, and participating in a riot in downtown Minneapolis on December 31, 2020. The Minnesota Freedom Fund paid the $5,000 bail for the arrest on October 15, 2020, and the $60,000 bail for his arrest related to the December 31 riot. The man pled guilty to federal weapons charges in August 2021, stemming from investigations from his prior arrests.

In June 2021, the organization posted bail for people arrested during the Line 3 pipeline protests.

In April 2023, CBS News reported that a suspect who had just been arrested as a suspect for setting a mosque on fire had had his bail for a previous arrest for suspected arson that had happened in 2021 paid for by the organization.

== Policy positions ==
The organization supports abolition of bail fees. It believes that bail furthers poverty by keeping people in jail longer, resulting in job loss, and it promotes plea deals that can allow people to leave jail.
