= Virginia Lane Frazier =

- Born: October 14, 1921
- Died: 2012 (aged 90–91)
- Burial place: Fort Snelling National Cemetery
- Military career
- Women's Army Corps: Army
- Service years: 1943–1945
- Unit: 6888th Central Postal Directory Battalion
- Awards: Congressional Gold Medal (2022)

Virginia Lane Frazier (1921–2012) was one of the first black women to enlist in the US Army Women's Corps from Minnesota during World War II. She served in the 6888th Central Postal Directory Battalion, the only all-African American, all-female unit to be deployed overseas during the war.

== Biography ==
Lane grew up in Minneapolis. She attended Wayman A.M.E. Church and won literary and art awards through the state for her writing. She was descended from Ophelia Rice, one of the founders of the Bethesda Baptist Church and a member of the Negro State Federated Women's Club, who had arrived in Minnesota in 1864 through the Underground Railroad.

Lane enlisted in the U.S. Army Women's Corps with other Minnesota black women such as Vernie Mae Smith, Bernice Eunice Huggar, and Elnora Alta Wallace. She completed her basic training in Iowa and reported to the Walla Walla Air Force base as one of the first black women assigned to the Air Corps. With her downtime, Lane played tennis, winning station championships, and was crowned "Miss Section B" of the 224th WAC Battalion.

In February 1945, Lane landed in Birmingham, England after joining the all-black 6888th Central Postal Directory Battalion (nicknamed the Six Triple Eight), which was responsible for processing a large backlog of undelivered mail, affecting morale on the European front. Birmingham had survived the Battle of Britain, but was subject to frequent air raids. The battalion worked out of a bombed-out Birmingham schoolhouse and processed an average of 65,000 pieces of mail per shift. They cleared the 17-million item, six-month backlog of mail in three months. However, the group also faced racial segregation.

Bronze replica of the Congressional Gold Medal awarded to the members of the 6888th Central Postal Directory Battalion

Lane was discharged in November 1945 and received five medals: the European Theater of Operations ribbon, the WAC medal, the Good Conduct medal, the American Defense ribbon, and the Victory ribbon. She married Arthur L. Frazier, a fellow veteran, in 1946. The couple moved to California and had eight children.

Virginia Lane Frazier passed away in 2012. She rests at Fort Snelling National Cemetery.

The battalion received Congressional Gold Medals from Joe Biden in 2022. Her daughter and granddaughter traveled to Birmingham to remember her in 2023.
