= 2021 Minneapolis Question 2 =

Political movement in the U.S. state of Minnesota

- November 2, 2021
- Public Safety Ballot Measure

Results
| Choice | Votes | % |
|---|---|---|
| Yes | 62,813 | 43.83% |
| No | 80,506 | 56.17% |
| Total votes | 143,319 | 100.00% |
Yes:
70%–80%
60%–70%
50%–60%
No:
50%–60%
60%–70%
70%–80%
80%–90%

The police abolition movement gained momentum in the U.S. city of Minneapolis during protests of the murder of George Floyd in 2020 and culminated in the failed Question 2 ballot measure in 2021 to replace the city's police department with a public safety department. The measure would have removed minimum staffing levels for sworn officers, renamed the Minneapolis Police Department as the Minneapolis Department of Public Safety, and shifted oversight of the new agency from the mayor's office to the city council. It required the support of 51 percent of voters in order to pass. In the Minneapolis municipal election held on November 2, 2021, the measure failed with 43.8 percent voting for it and 56.2 percent voting against it.

The ballot measure was part of the political movement in the aftermath of Floyd's murder by local political activists that sought to replace the Minneapolis Police Department with another system of public safety and divert its budget towards social services programs in the city, such as affordable housing, violence prevention, education, and food security. A public pledge by nine of the 13 elected members of the Minneapolis City Council on June 7, 2020, to "defund police" garnered significant attention for the police abolition movement, as well as considerable political backlash. The goals of the "defund police" pledge were never fully defined by city council members at the time of the pledge and the effort largely collapsed in the following months. Polling in August 2020 revealed that even though 73% of respondents supported defunding the police, only 40% supported reducing the size of the police force while 44% opposed.

Public discussion in late 2020 about changing the city's policing policies came during a surge in violent crime. At the end of 2020, city council shifted 4.5 percent of the city's annual police budget to violence prevention programs, despite activists and local lawmakers wanting more. Though the city council committed to maintaining the same number of police officer positions, attrition and disability claims left the department with 200 fewer police officers. Complaints about slower response times to 911 calls increased, and during a City Council meeting Council Member Andrea Jenkins questioned officers' apparent refusal to respond to certain parts of the city.

After the failed vote, public attention shifted away from ambitious police reform measures and towards crime reduction and more incremental reform strategies.

== Background ==
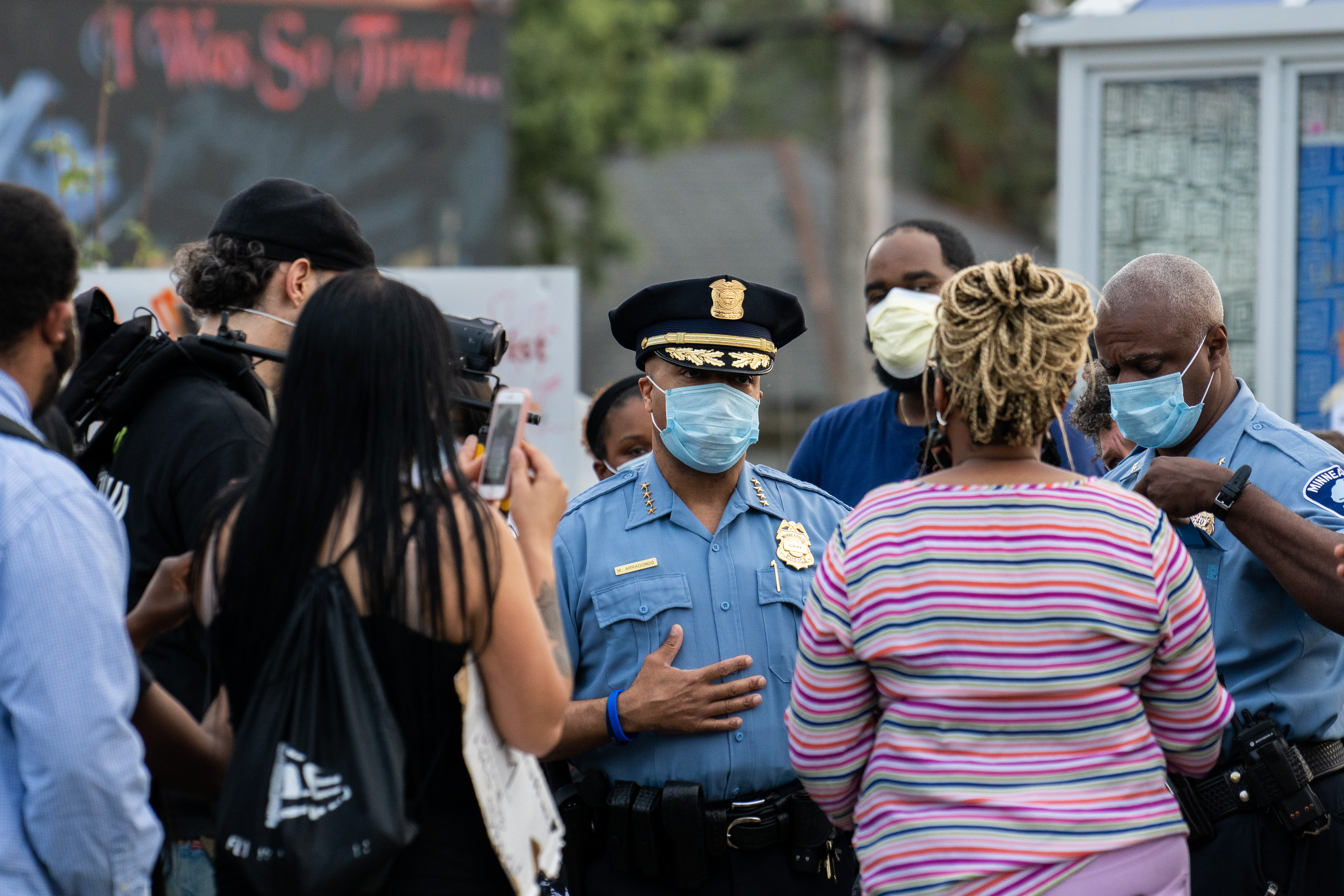
Minneapolis Police Chief Medaria Arradondo, May 31, 2020

=== Police abolition movement ===
Across the United States, community groups advocated for reducing government budgets and “public safety” spending on police and prisons and reallocating funding towards services like housing, employment, community health, and education. In Minneapolis, the local advocacy group MPD150 published a report in 2017 recommending the Minneapolis Police Department be abolished, argued that "the people who respond to crises in our community should be the people who are best-equipped to deal with those crises" and that first responders should be social workers and mental health providers.

=== George Floyd protests ===
Following the murder of George Floyd by police officer Derek Chauvin and the resulting civil unrest, Minneapolis Public Schools, the Minneapolis Park and Recreation Board, multiple private businesses and venues, and the University of Minnesota severed ties with the Minneapolis Police Department. Civil leaders in Minneapolis and elsewhere began calling for reforms of the city's police force, including the defunding, downsizing, or abolishing of departments. During heavy rioting in Minneapolis the night of May 28, 2020, demonstrators set the third police precinct station ablaze as police forces retreated from the area of East Lake Street and Minnehaha Avenue.

== Timeline ==
=== 2020 ===
==== March to Mayor Frey's home ====
On June 6, 2020, thousands of protesters marched in Minneapolis in an event led by local organization Black Visions Collective. Protesters gathered at the city's Bottineau Field Park, marched past the Minneapolis Police Federation's union headquarters, and ended at Minneapolis Mayor Jacob Frey's private home. The march featured chants of "George Floyd!" and "Black Lives Matter!" and pleas to defund the police.

At Frey's home, the crowd demanded that he come outside, and then when Frey appeared asked if he supported abolishing the city's police force. After Frey responded that he did not, the crowd ordered him to leave and booed him away. At the rally, United States Representative Ilhan Omar, whose Minnesota's 5th congressional district encompassed Minneapolis, denounced the city's police force as "inherently beyond reform".

==== Powderhorn Park rally ====
A "defund police" sign and stage before a rally at Powderhorn Park in Minneapolis, June 7, 2020

On June 7, 2020, at a Powderhorn Park rally organized by Black Visions Collective and several other black-led social justice organizations, nine of the 13 members of the Minneapolis City Council vowed before a large crowd to dismantle the city's police department.

Onstage taking the pledge were Council President Lisa Bender, Vice President Andrea Jenkins and Council Members Alondra Cano, Phillipe Cunningham, Jeremiah Ellison, Steve Fletcher, Cam Gordon, Andrew Johnson, and Jeremy Schroeder. At the rally, Bender said of the pledge to abolish the city's police force, "Our efforts at incremental reform have failed. Period." Council Member Linea Palmisano attended the rally as an audience member, but did not go on stage or take the pledge, and Council Members Lisa Goodman and Kevin Reich did not attend nor agree to the pledge.

The June 7 pledge by nine city council members, though it represented a veto-proof majority, did not actually disband the Minneapolis police force and details about the next steps in the process were not defined at the time. Some activists wanted to consider the idea of unarmed crisis response personnel and re-purposing the police department's $193 million annual budget for education, food, housing, and health care.

==== Council approves city charter referendum ====
The city council voted unanimously in late June 2020 to place the option of revising the city's charter to permit removing the minimum staffing requirement from the City Charter, renaming the Police Department and shifting oversight from the Mayor to the City Council. The charter required the city to “fund a police force of at least 0.0017 employees per resident”.

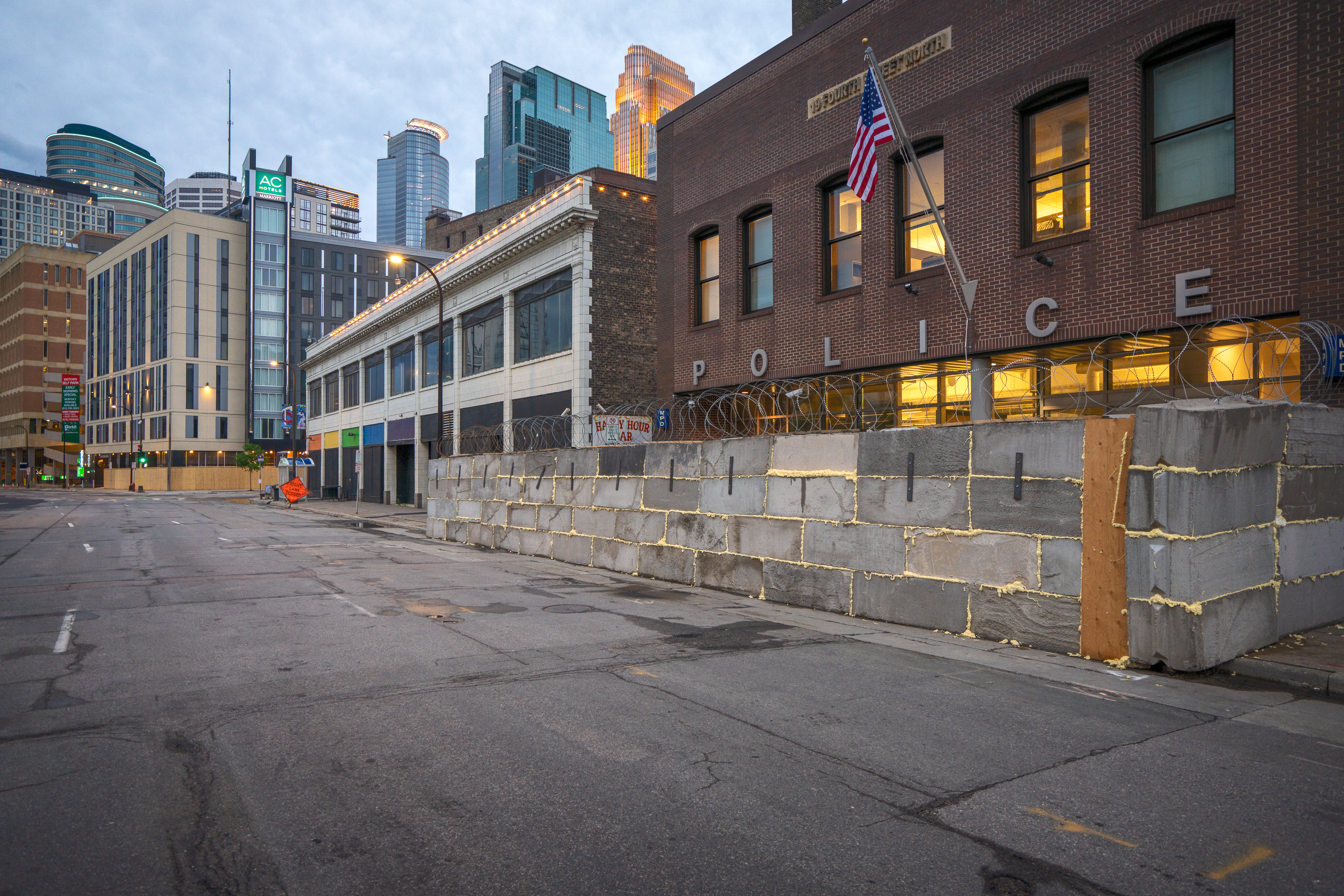
Minneapolis first police precinct building protected by a temporary wall, June 9, 2020

Anti-police graffiti, June 13, 2020

==== Private security hired for city councilors ====
Several city council members received death threats in the wake of the pledge to defund the city's police. It was revealed in July 2020 that on June 7, 2020, the same day that they pledged to "begin the process of ending" the police department, Council Members Cano, Cunningham, and Jenkins used $152,400 in city funds to hire private security guards. All three had pledged on stage to "defund police" in the city. Several activists felt it was it was hypocritical for councilors to have extra security when the same privilege was not extended to other residents of the city. According to the mayor's office, the three council members had not asked for a Minneapolis police vehicle to park outside their home to maintain a security presence.

==== Opposition from Black leaders ====
In June 2020, the council's move to amend the city charter drew opposition from some Black leaders and activists who felt that the council was "pandering" to activists, in the words of a local pastor. Others felt that the council had not adequately included voices from the Black community in the process and expressed the need to address public safety concerns as black residents were disproportionately victims of crime and witnesses of crime in the city, just as they were disproportionately victims of excessive police force.

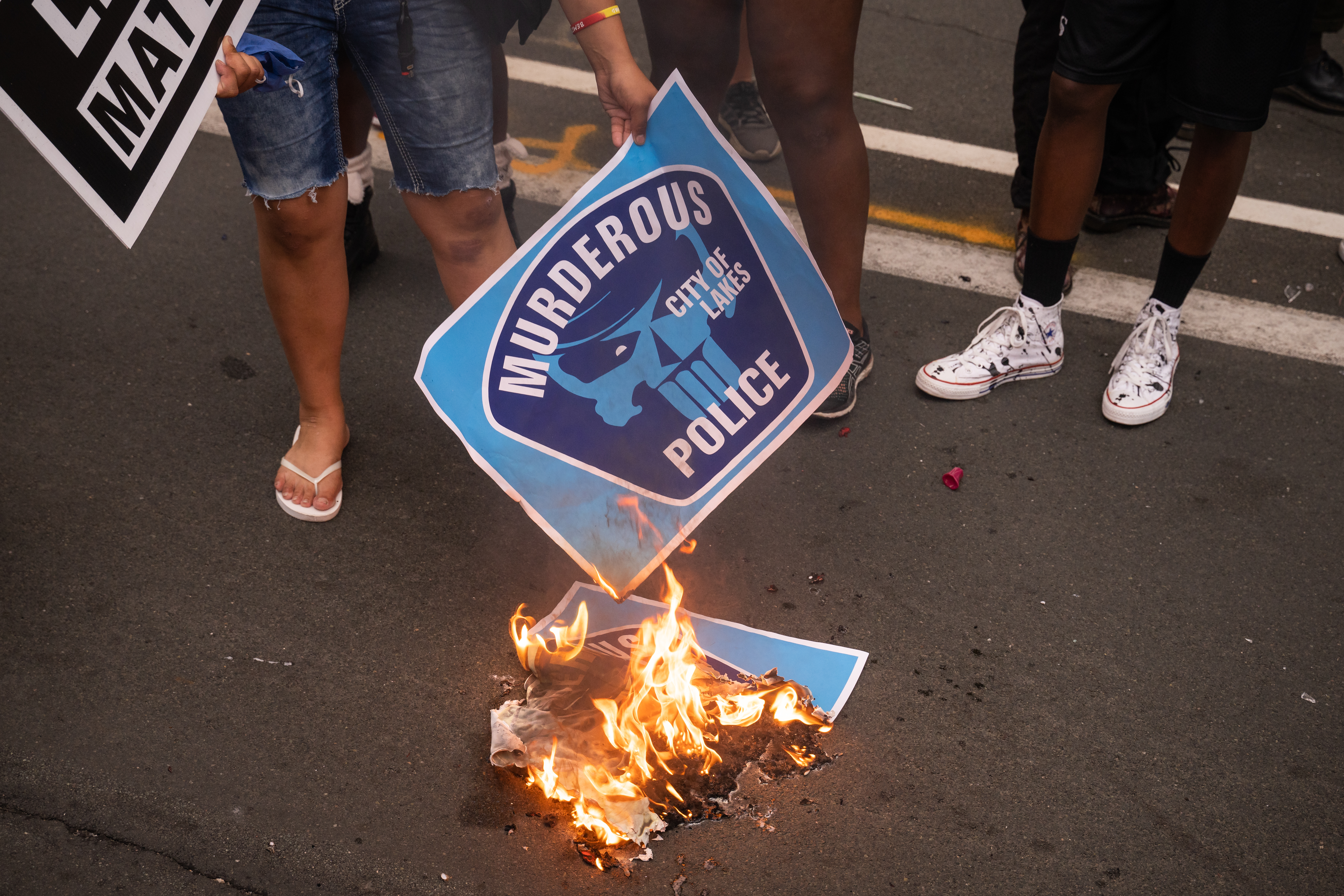
Protest demonstration, August 24, 2020

==== City charter referendum blocked ====
In August 2020, the Minneapolis City Charter Commission voted to block plans to hold a vote on the proposed city charter amendment in November 2020, citing a need to for longer review and greater public input. The charter amendment still had the potential to be put before voters in November 2021 with the city's mayor and city council seats up for re-election.

==== "Defund police" pledge reinterpreted ====
The June 7, 2020, pledge by nine of the 13 Minneapolis Council Members to abolish the police department generated substantial media coverage initially, but the pledge largely collapsed in the following months. Council members who took it had different interpretations about its meaning when reflecting back on it several months later. Council Member Andrew Johnson, for example, said the pledge was meant "in spirit" and not to be taken literally. Some advocates, however, were expecting complete abolition of the police force, or a substantial reduction in the department's budget. When asked directly in October 2020 by Minnesota Public Radio if they still supported abolishing the police department, no Minneapolis council member directly answered "yes", and Council Members Ellison and Goodman declined to respond to the survey at all. During his reelection campaign in 2021, Minneapolis City Council Member Phillipe Cunningham said that he did not see the "defund police" sign at the June 7, 2020, rally before going on stage, and that he did not support the aim of the Black Visions Collective, an organizer of the event, to abolish the police.

==== Municipal election results and aftermath ====
With 86% of the vote in the election on November 3, 2020, Minneapolis voters approved a referendum about the timing of municipal elections, putting city council seats temporarily under two-year terms with the next election scheduled for 2021. Of the nine Council Members that made the pledge, seven ran for reelection. Minneapolis Council President Lisa Bender announced that she would not seek reelection to her tenth ward seat. Bender said her decision was made before the period of prolonged unrest in the city sparked by George Floyd's murder. In December 2020, Council Member Alondra Cano declined to seek reelection to her seat representing the city's ninth ward that sustained heavy damage during the May 2020 riots. Bender and Cano were among the nine city councilors that pledged to abolish the city's police department. Minneapolis Mayor Jacob Frey announced his intention to run for re-election in 2021 also.

==== Violence prevention pilot programs established ====
Protest march on Interstate 94, November 4, 2020

By late 2020, public polling revealed mixed views among Minneapolis residents about reduced funding for the police, with more than half of the city's residents opposing a reduction in the size of the police force. Decisions about the allocation of city resources and size of the police department came as Minneapolis had tallied its highest levels of violent crime in decades.

Because there were more unfilled positions than could be filled in one year in 2021, it was possible to both retain positions (that could be filled in future years) and reallocate funds to other projects. In December, the Minneapolis city council voted to redirect $7.7 million of the police department's proposed $179 million budget to mental health crisis teams, violence prevention programs, and for civilian employees to handle non-emergency theft and property damage reports. The council placed $11.4 million of the police budget in a reserve fund that requires ad hoc council approval for police recruitment and overtime. By a 7–6 margin, the council voted to keep in place the police department target level of 888 officers for 2022 and beyond.

The debate to reduce police funding in Minneapolis occurred as the city contended with persistently elevated levels of violent crime following the murder of George Floyd in May 2020. On June 17, 2021, the city council unanimously approved the release of $5 million in emergency funds to cover police overtime, which partially offset the budget reductions in December 2020.

=== 2021 ===
==== Council renews action ====
In January 2021, Minneapolis City Council Members Phillipe Cunningham, Steve Fletcher, and Jeremy Schroeder introduced a new city charter amendment to remove the city charter amendment to require a minimum number of police officers, rename the Police Department to the Department of Public Safety, and place the new department under the control of the City Council. Minneapolis Mayor Jacob Frey said he opposed the approach. The council members voted to put the amendment before voters in the 2021 November municipal election.

==== Outside money enters the 2021 campaign ====
The Open Society Policy Center based in Washington, D.C. donated $500,000 to create a new political committee and non-profit, Yes 4 Minneapolis, to advance the police abolition movement in Minneapolis and influence the 2021 municipal elections. The new entity sought to work closely with two existing local organizations, Reclaim the Block and Black Visions, that led police abolition protests rallies in June 2020. By the end of the campaign, Yes 4 Minneapolis spent over $3.5 million, with most of the money coming from special interest groups outside the city.

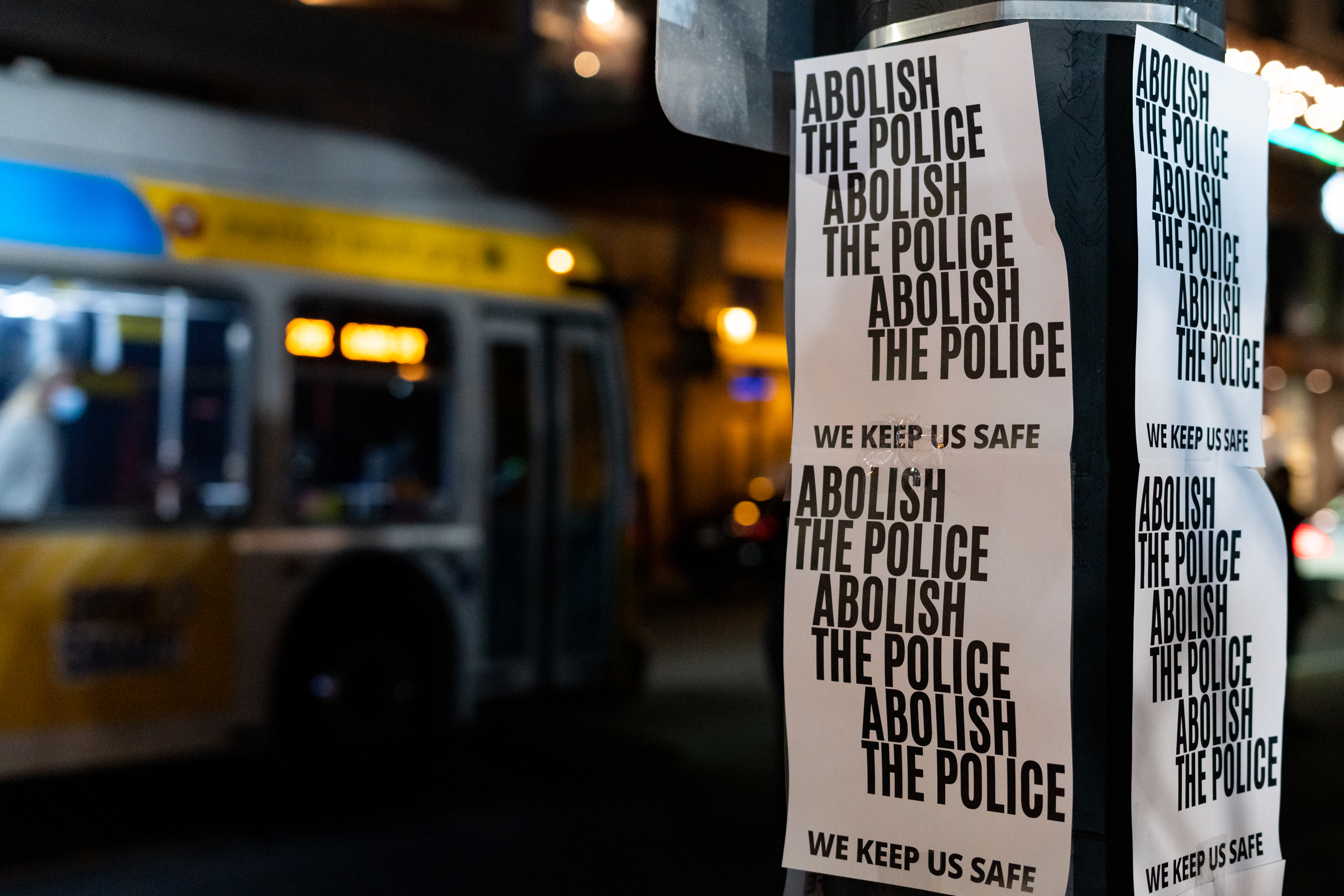
"Abolish the police" signs in Uptown, Minneapolis, October 2, 2021

==== Reduction in police officers via attrition ====
The city charter's minimum number of police officers was set at 0.007 percent of the city's population, which in the most recent census equated to about 730 sworn officers. By January 30, 2021, Minneapolis had 817 sworn officers under employment, but 155 were on continuous leave due to post-traumatic stress blamed on the response to civil unrest that followed the murder of George Floyd on May 25, 2020. By February 2020, Minneapolis was down to only 638 officers that were capable of working, which was well below the 2019 average of 851 sworn officers. Due to the shortage of officers, the police department focused on responding to 9-1-1 calls as the city dealt with a surge in violent crimes such as homicides, shootings, and robberies. Police were much less able to respond to calls for help and some formed their own safety patrol, although they did not last. A group of north Minneapolis residents sued the city for not adequately staffing its police department and won a judgement requiring the city to provide the minimum number of police required by City Charter by June 30, 2022.

==== Activist plan ====
A coalition of progressive organizations—Yes 4 Minneapolis, Reclaim the Block, and TakeAction Minnesota—launched a petition drive in February to put the future of the city's police department before voters on the November 2021 ballot. The petition sought to amend the city's charter to remove the minimum staffing requirement, rename the police department to a "public safety department" and shift oversight from the Mayor to the City Council. On April 30, 2021, advocacy organizations delivered more than 20,000 petition signatures to the Minneapolis city clerk's office to meet a deadline imposed by the city's charter commission for the measure to be considered for the November ballot. By city law, at least 11,906 register voters, or 5% of votes cast in the last general election, must be certified by the clerk by May 17. The clerk certified 14,101 of the signatures as valid, which advanced the proposal for review by the Charter Commission. To be enacted, 51% of city votes would have to approve it.

==== City council plan ====
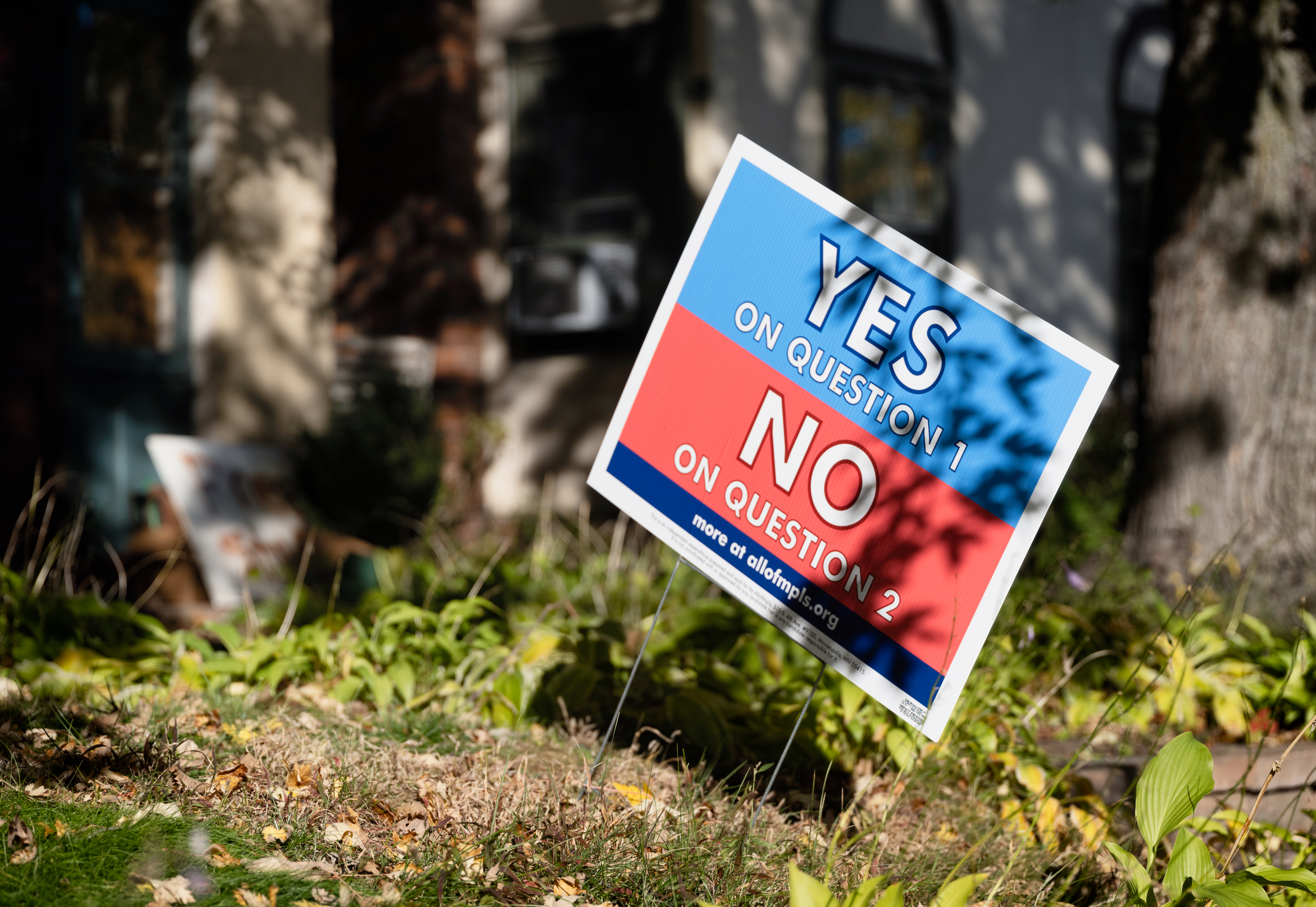
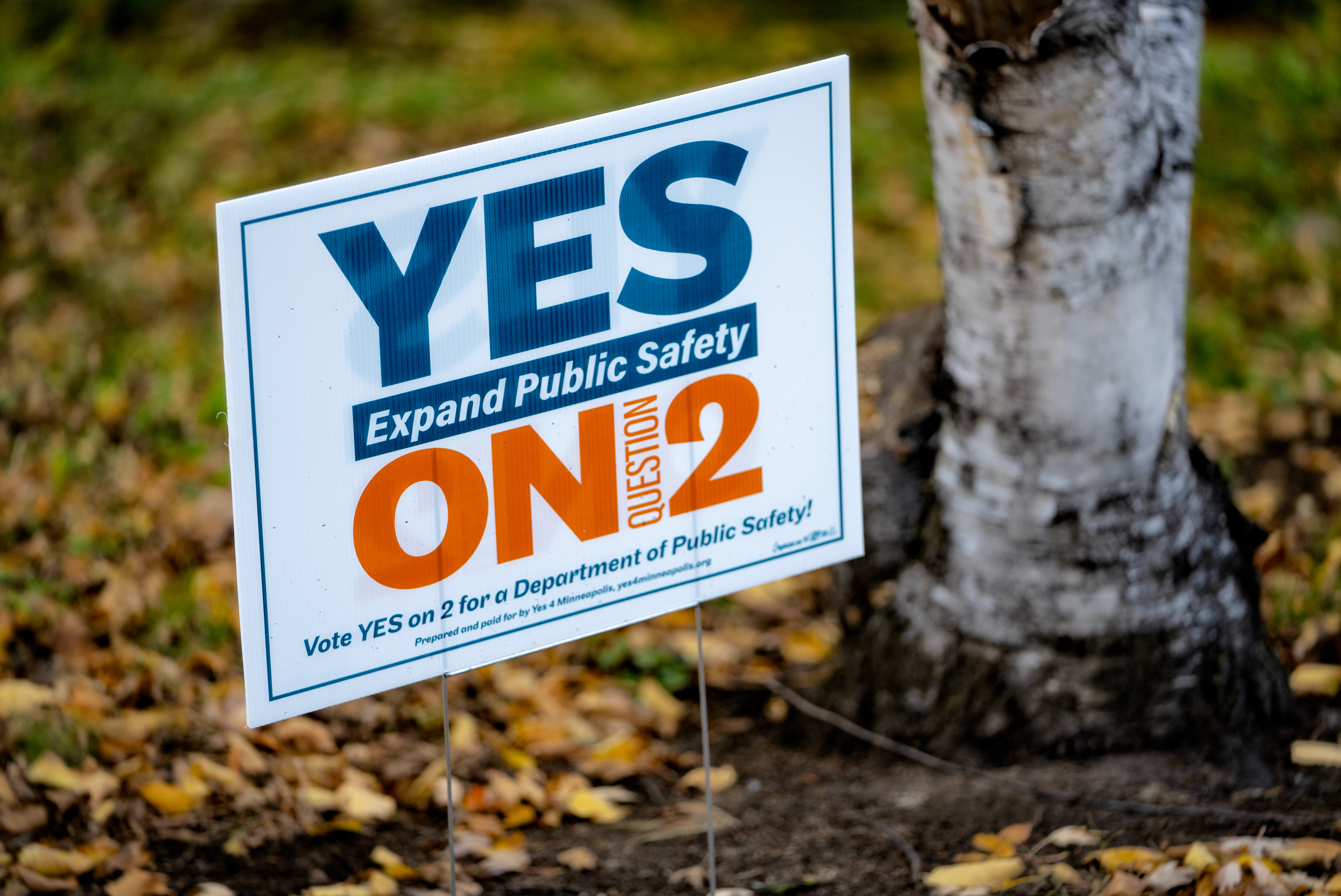
A sign opposing Question 2 (at left) and supporting Question 2 (at right).

On March 12, 2021, the city council approved by an 11–2 vote, the plan by Cunningham, Fletcher, and Schroeder to put before voters a proposal to eliminate the city charter requirement to maintain a police force of a minimum number of officers based on the city's population, rename the Police Department as the Department of Public Safety, and place the new department under the control of the City Council. Council members Palmisano and Goodman were the only two dissenting votes. The city's Charter Commission, under the charter amendment process, had until August 2021 to review the council's recommendation.

The council's proposal was nearly identical the plan outlined in the petition drive because the Council Members worked with activists to create the two proposals. The key difference, however, was that the council plan required the new department to maintain some sworn police officers, while the activist plan allowed eliminating sworn police officers completely, requiring police "only if necessary". This would leave open the possibility of eliminating sworn police officers completely. In June 2021, Cunningham, Fletcher, and Schroeder withdrew their proposal to avoid having two similar proposals before voters.

==== Court challenges ====
Several lawsuits were filed by Minneapolis residents to prevent the police force from being reduced in size or eliminated. In July 2021, Hennepin County Judge Jamie Anderson ruled in favor of plaintiffs from the Hawthorne and Jordan neighborhoods in North Minneapolis, the part of the city with the highest number of minority persons, who argued that the city was in violation of the charter requirement to maintain at least 730 sworn officers. Anderson's ruling required the city to take immediate steps to maintain an adequately sized police force and meet the requirement of at least 730 police officers by June 30, 2022. On August 11, 2021, the Minnesota Supreme Court denied a city request to review Anderson's ruling, effectively allowing it to stand.

In mid 2021, another group of Minneapolis residents from North Minneapolis sued the city to block the ballot measure, arguing that the description and wording of the ballot measure was misleading as it did not clearly say that it would remove the minimum staffing levels for police. Judge Anderson ruled in favor of the residents on September 7, 2021, and barred counting votes cast for or against the Council-approved language. The city council met in an emergency session and approved new ballot language later the same day which included an explanatory note which gave more details on what the amendment actually did. After an appeal to the Minnesota Supreme Court, the justices overturned Judge Anderson's ruling on September 16, 2021, allowing votes to be tallied, but by then, the City Council had already approved the clarifying language.

== November 2021 election ==
Results of Question 2 by precinct Yes: 70%–80% 60%–70% 50%–60% No: 50%–60% 60%–70% 70%–80% 80%–90%

=== Ballot measure ===
Final language printed on the ballot language as on the November 2021 municipal election ballot:

City Question 2 – Department of Public Safety

Shall the Minneapolis City Charter be amended to remove the Police Department and replace it with a Department of Public Safety that employs a comprehensive public health approach to the delivery of functions by the Department of Public Safety, with those specific functions to be determined by the Mayor and City Council by ordinance; which will not be subject to exclusive mayoral power over its establishment, maintenance, and command; and which could include licensed peace officers (police officers), if necessary, to fulfill its responsibilities for public safety, with the general nature of the amendments being briefly indicated in the explanatory note below, which is made a part of this ballot?

Explanatory Note: This amendment would create a Department of Public Safety combining public safety functions through a comprehensive public health approach to be determined by the Mayor and Council. The department would be led by a Commissioner nominated by the Mayor and appointed by the Council. The Police Department, and its chief, would be removed from the City Charter. The Public Safety Department could include police officers, but the minimum funding requirement would be eliminated.

The ballot measure needed at least 51 percent of vote to be approved. By state law, city officials would have 30 days to implement the charter changes, if the amendment were to pass. The exact structure of the new department, the services it would provide, the number of police officers it employs, and its funding level were not disclosed at the time of the vote and were planned to be revealed only if the amendment passed.

=== Result ===
On November 2, 2021, voters in Minneapolis rejected the ballot measure with 80,506 or 56.2 percent of votes cast for "no" versus 62,813 or 43.8% of votes for "yes". One poll reported less support for the proposed safety department among Black voters than among White voters, with Black voters reporting concerns about the potential negative impact of cutting the police force on public safety. The precinct that voted for Question 2 by the highest margin (78%) was precinct 2-10.

City Question 2
| Choice | Votes | % |
|---|---|---|
| For | 62,813 | 43.83 |
| Against | 80,506 | 56.17 |
| Total | 143,319 | 100.00 |

== Aftermath ==
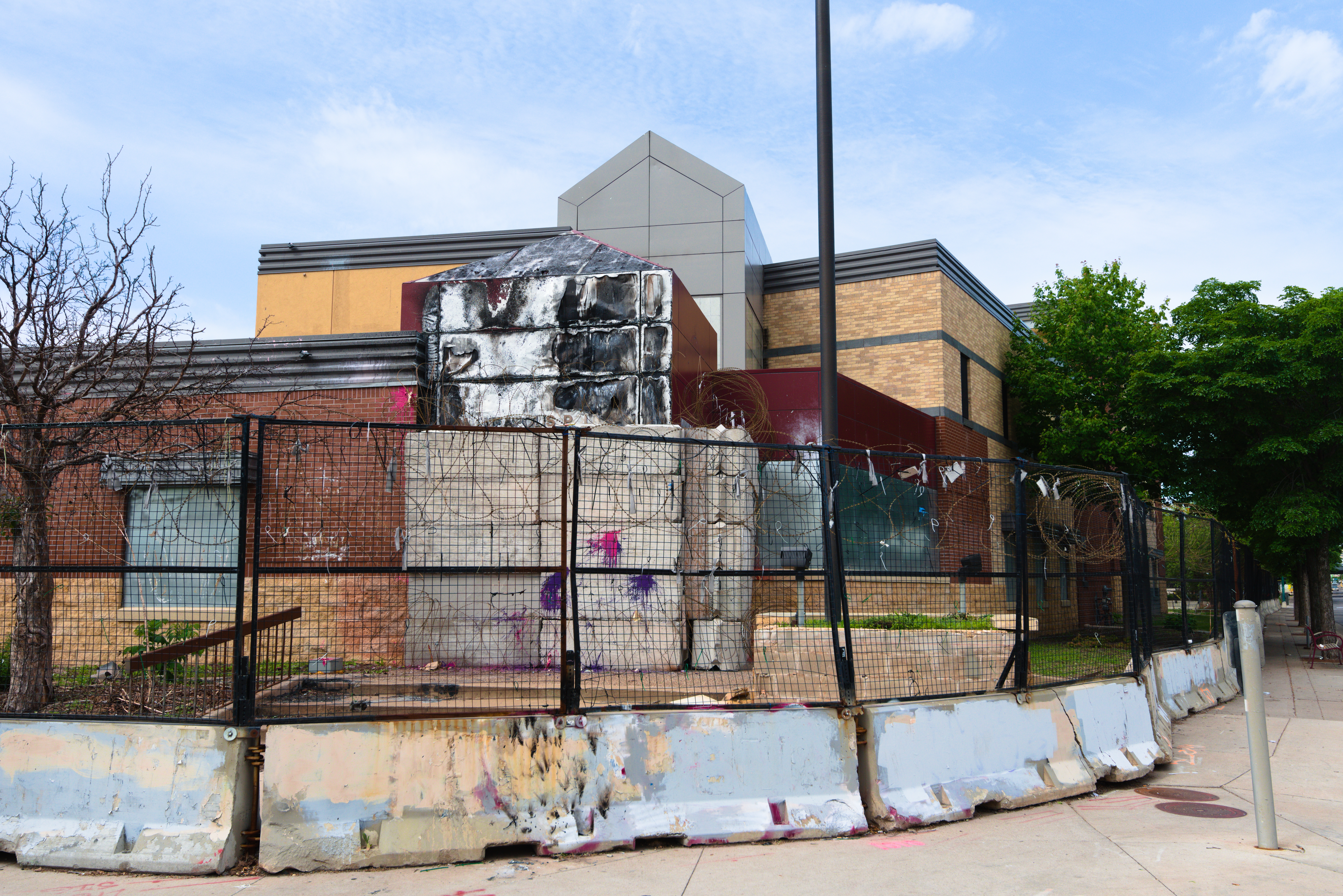
The vacant Minneapolis third precinct police station, June 10, 2022

In December 2021, city officials restored police funding in Minneapolis to $191 million—the approximate amount of the police budget at the start of 2020 and prior to the financial resource diversion following the murder of George Floyd. The city also funded an $11.3 million Office of Violence Prevention and $6 million for mental health responders. The Minneapolis Park and Recreation Board's police department, which had cut ties with the Minneapolis Police Department in the days after Floyd's murder, re-established its relationship on May 4, 2022. The University of Minnesota reinstated its relationship with Minneapolis Police Department on August 24, 2022.

Rising violent crime in the United States had resulted in backlash against efforts to "defund the police" and shifted public conversation away from police reform to reducing crime. In Minneapolis, the city's police force lost 300 officers in the aftermath of Floyd's murder. Ruling in a lawsuit filed by northside residents, the Minnesota Supreme Court ruled on June 20, 2022, that Minneapolis was required to enforce its charter and work in good faith to restore officer levels to a minimum of 731 police. On November 2, 2023, the city council approved a plan to create a new police station and community center serving the third precinct that would be located a half-mile north the building that was torched during the 2020 riots. Leading up to, and as a result of, the 2023 Minneapolis City Council election, many local elected officials distanced themselves from the "defund police" and "police abolition" movements in favor of more nuanced and incremental reform strategies to policing.

== See also ==
- 2020–2021 Minneapolis–Saint Paul racial unrest
- George Floyd Square
- Government of Minneapolis
- List of civil unrest in Minneapolis–Saint Paul
- Timeline of race relations and policing in Minneapolis–Saint Paul
