= Medaria Arradondo =

American former police chief of Minneapolis (born 1967)

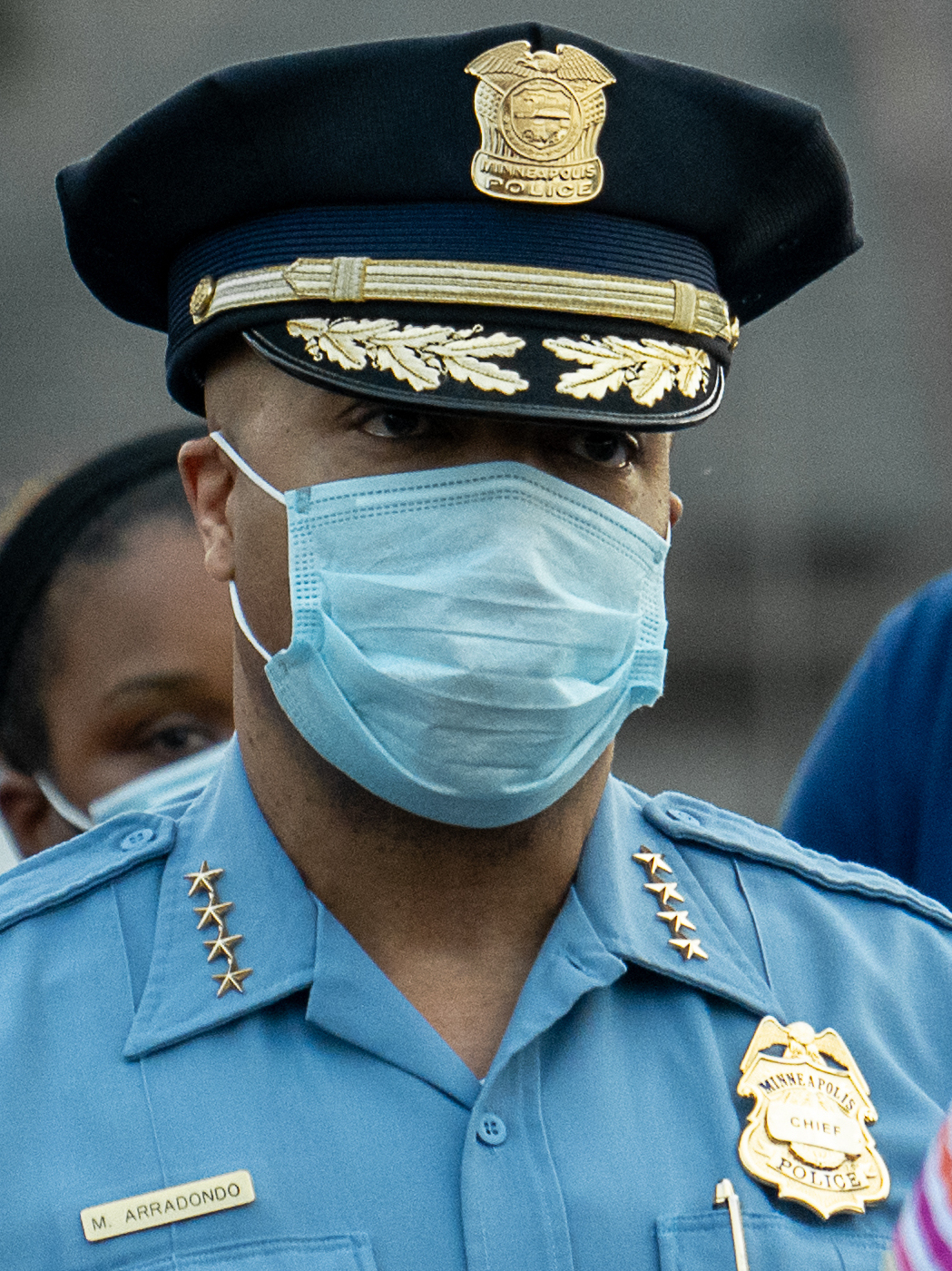
- Arradondo in 2020

53rd Chief of the Minneapolis Police Department
- In office July 21, 2017 – January 15, 2022
- Appointed by: Betsy Hodges
- Preceded by: Janeé Harteau
- Succeeded by: Brian O'Hara

Personal details
- Born: 1967 (age 58–59) Minneapolis, Minnesota, U.S.
- Children: 2

Medaria Arradondo (born 1967) is an American law enforcement official who served as the Chief of the Minneapolis Police Department from 2017 to 2022. He was the first black chief of the Minneapolis Police Department.

== Career ==
A fifth-generation Minnesota resident of Colombian heritage, Arradondo joined the MPD in 1989 as a patrol officer in the Fourth Precinct and worked his way up through the police ranks until he was named the inspector for the First Precinct. In 2007, he and four other African-American officers sued the department alleging discrimination in promotions, pay, and discipline. The lawsuit was settled by the city for $740,000, and in December 2012 Arradondo was promoted to head of the Internal Affairs Unit responsible for investigation of allegations of officer misconduct.

Arradondo was a Deputy Chief and Assistant Chief before being nominated as Minneapolis's new Chief of Police by Mayor Betsy Hodges after the resignation of former police chief Janeé Harteau in mid-2017, shortly after the shooting of Justine Damond by former Minneapolis police officer Mohammed Noor.

During Super Bowl LII, Arradondo authorized banning Philadelphia-style tailgating.

As police chief, Arradondo stopped the practice of low-level marijuana stings due to complaints about racial disparities, and codified the relationship between police and emergency medical service providers (EMT).

Arradondo was chief of police during the high-profile murder of George Floyd and subsequent widespread protests and destruction. He fired all four officers involved, which was a historic decision, and later directly addressed the family of George Floyd, stating that his position that all four officers involved were at fault and he was awaiting charges from the county attorney and/or FBI. On June 10, 2020, Arradondo announced both the cancellation of future contract negotiations with the police union and plans to bring in outside experts to examine how the contract with the Police Officers Federation can be restructured to create a warning system which will provide transparency about "troubled" officers and "flexibility for true reform". On June 16, 2020, Arradondo dismissed the significance of recent reports of 19 departures from the Minneapolis Police Department within a year, stating that the Minneapolis Police Department experiences an average of 40 departures per year.

During a 60 Minutes interview with Lesley Stahl which aired on June 21, 2020, Arradondo stated that there was distrust of law enforcement in Minneapolis's black community and that "we need good policing. We know it's broken. We need to make changes." During the interview, Arradondo did not back demands for dismantling and defunding the Minneapolis Police Department, suggesting instead the enforcement of recent bans on physical restraints such as chokeholds and neck restraints, eliminating barriers that protect Minneapolis police officers from misconduct charges, and changes to police union contracts which allow officers who are fired or disciplined to get arbitration.

He opposed a 2021 ballot measure to abolish the Minneapolis police department, which voters ultimately rejected with 56% against.

In December 2021, Arradondo announced his retirement effective January 15, 2022.

== Dates of rank ==
- Police Officer - 1989
- Sergeant - 1999
- Lieutenant - 2005
- Commander - 2011
- Inspector - 2013
- Deputy Chief - 2015
- Chief of Police - 2017

== Personal life ==
Arradondo is one of nine siblings. He graduated from Roosevelt High School in Minneapolis and Finlandia University (then called Suomi College) in Hancock, Michigan. Arradondo is the first black person to serve as chief of the Minneapolis Police Department.

== See also ==
- 2020–2021 Minneapolis–Saint Paul racial unrest
- Police abolition movement in Minneapolis
