= Black Visions Collective =

American Black liberation non-profit organisation

- Formation: 2017; 9 years ago
- Type: Non-profit
- Purpose: Black liberation
- Headquarters: Minnesota, United States
- Region served: Minneapolis–Saint Paul metropolitan area
- Website: www.blackvisionsmn.org

Black Visions Collective (BLVC) is an American nonprofit organization for Black liberation based in Minnesota, founded in December 2017. (Note: As of August 2020, BLVC is a non-profit project fiscally sponsored by TakeAction Minnesota, a nonprofit organization with both 501(c)3 and 501(c)4 affiliations.) The group intersects with transgender and LGBTQ communities. Active in the Minneapolis–Saint Paul metropolitan area, BLVC has been involved in Black Lives Matter protests. It has lobbied for part of the Minneapolis Police Department budget to be diverted to programs that support people experiencing youth homelessness, opioid dependency, and mental health issues.

In 2019, BLVC received a grant from the Minneapolis Climate Action and Racial Equity Fund to develop an environmental justice leadership panel of people of color and indigenous people. The fund was created through a partnership between the city of Minneapolis, the Minneapolis Foundation, and the McKnight Foundation.

In June 2020, the Minnesota Freedom Fund recommended that people donate to the Black Visions Collective, among other organizations, after receiving $20 million in a week following the murder of George Floyd.

On May 30, 2020, Sudanese-American musician Dua Saleh released the song "body cast", about police brutality, with proceeds raised going to the Black Visions Collective. The band Walk the Moon announced on the same day that it would match fan donations to the organization up to $4,000.

== See also ==
- 2021 Minneapolis Question 2
