= Consent decree =

Type of legal settlement

A consent decree is an agreement or settlement that resolves a dispute between two parties without admission of guilt (in a criminal case) or liability (in a civil case). Most often it is such a type of settlement in the United States. (Note: Consent orders are also used by Canadian courts.) The plaintiff and the defendant ask the court to enter into their agreement, and the court maintains supervision over the implementation of the decree in monetary exchanges or restructured interactions between parties. It is similar to and sometimes referred to as an antitrust decree, stipulated judgment, or consent judgment. Consent decrees are frequently used by federal courts to ensure that businesses and industries adhere to regulatory laws in areas such as antitrust law, employment discrimination, and environmental regulation.

== Legal process ==
The process of introducing a consent decree begins with negotiation. One of three things happens: a lawsuit is filed and the parties concerned reach an agreement prior to adjudication of the contested issues; a lawsuit is filed and actively contested, and the parties reach an agreement after the court has ruled on some issues; or the parties settle their dispute prior to the filing of a lawsuit and they simultaneously file a lawsuit and request that the court agree to the entry of judgment. The court is meant to turn this agreement into a judicial decree. In many cases, the request for entry of a consent decree prompts judges to sign the documents presented then and there. In some cases, however, such as criminal cases, the judge must make some sorts of assessments before the court's entry of the agreement as a consent decree.

The usual consent decree is not self-executing. A consent decree is implemented when the parties transform their agreements from paper to reality. The judge who signed the decree may have no involvement or may monitor the implementation. The judge can only step in to assist in enforcement if a party complains to the court that an opponent has failed to perform as agreed. In this case, the offending party would be committed for contempt.

Decrees by consent are more binding than those issued in invitum, or against an unwilling party, which are subject to modification by the same court, and reversal by higher courts. The decree issued by consent cannot be modified, except by consent. If the decree was obtained by means of fraud or given by mistake, it may be set aside by a court. Errors of law or of inferences from the facts may invalidate it completely.

Typically, a consent decree dispenses with the necessity of having proof in court, since by definition the defendant agrees to the order. Thus, the use of a consent decree does not involve a sentence or an admission of guilt. Likewise, the consent decree prevents a finding of facts, so the decree cannot be pleaded as res adjudicata.

== History ==
Because judicial decrees are part of government civil enforcement in settlements that two parties typically agree to before litigation is filed, they act as a hybrid between a judicial order and a settlement without a party conceding criminal responsibility.

Frederick Pollock and Frederic Maitland describe how courts during the 12th century of Medieval Europe used "fines" as a form of court orders to settle land disputes among litigants with the punitive power and legitimacy of courts through the use of consent decree. In the United States, 19th and 20th century legal treatises show that consent decrees and the role of the court in the parties' settlement was ambiguous. The 1947 Corpus Juris Secundum declares that although consent decrees are "not the judgment of the court", they do have the "force and effect of a judgment".

=== Federal Rules of Civil and Criminal Procedure ===
The Federal Rules of Civil Procedure and the Federal Rules of Criminal Procedure, which both went into effect in 1938, lay many of the legal foundations that govern the use of consent decrees. Creating space for courts, which are important actors in implementing a consent decree, to enter into a settlement, Rule 23 of the Federal Rules of Civil Procedure gives federal district courts the power to approve class action settlements as long as they are "fair, reasonable, and adequate". Rule 54(b) defines judgment, which refers to consent decree, and allows the court to "direct entry of a final judgment" when multiple parties are involved, and Rule 58 describes the procedure of how parties may enter judgment. Additionally, Rule 60 describes conditions under which parties can be granted "relief from a judgment or order" (such as a consent decree). As Rule 48 in the Federal Rules of Criminal Procedure stipulates that dismissals in criminal cases may not occur without "leave of court", Rule 41 allows, if all the parties agree, the court to dismiss any suit besides class action suits, shareholder derivative suits, or bankruptcy action. Many of these rules create the space for consent decree by establishing the role of judges within the settlement of two parties.

=== Precedents ===
Many of the early court cases involving consent decree set precedents for the roles that judges would play in the negotiating, approving, interpreting, and modifying a settlement between two parties. The role of the judge in regard to consent decree wavers between "rubber stamping" versus applying their own judgments to a proposed settlement. In 1879, Pacific Railroad of Missouri v. Ketchum bound the court's role in consent decrees to simply supporting to an agreement that parties have already established on their own. In regard to antitrust decrees, the first consent decree used in antitrust regulation under the Sherman Antitrust Act was Swift & Co. v. United States. With Swift & Co. v. United States, the Supreme Court ruled that a consent decree could be modified or terminated only when new developments over time bring out a "grievous wrong" in how the ruling of the consent decree affects the parties of the suit. The Supreme Court supported this limited flexibility of consent decrees in United States v. Terminal Railroad Association: "[A] decree will not be expanded by implication or intendment beyond the meaning of its terms when read in the light of the issues and the purposes for which the suit was brought."

In 1968, the Supreme Court ruled in United States v. United Shoe Machinery Corp., that to promote finality, a court's changes to consent a decree should be rare—but the courts can modify a consent decree or frame injunctive relief to ensure the litigation achieves its purpose. Before a judge can enter a consent decree, according to the rulings in Firefighters v. City of Cleveland and Firefighters v. Stotts they must have subject-matter jurisdiction, and they cannot modify a consent decree when one of the parties objects. The Supreme Court's position on how much authority a judge possesses in regard to influencing how the settlement is agreed upon is conflicting. In Firefighters v. City of Cleveland, the Supreme Court ruled that consent decrees "have attributes both of contracts and of judicial decrees", so consent decrees should be treated differently for different purposes. In Rufo v. Inmates of Suffolk County Jail, the Supreme Court decided that courts could take into account the changing times and circumstances for more flexibility in the administration of consent decrees.

In regard to litigation in performance rights organizations such as American Society of Composers, Authors and Publishers and Broadcast Music, Inc. in United States v. ASCAP, which began in 1941, the Department of Justice used consent decrees (which are amended according to the times and technology) to regulate how they issued blanket licenses to ensure that trade is not restrained and that the prices of licenses would not be competitive. The Department of Justice reviewed the music consent decrees starting 2019, and issued a statement in January 2021 that they would not be terminating them as they still offered several efficiencies in music licensing that maintained benefits to the artists.

== Most frequent uses ==
=== Antitrust law ===
Violations of antitrust law are typically resolved through consent decrees, which began to be more widely used after 1914 with the enactment of the Clayton Antitrust Act. This act began to address the complexities of antitrust economic regulation by recognizing the use of consent decrees as a method for the enforcement of federal antitrust legislation. In amending the antitrust statutes laid out in the Sherman Antitrust Act (1890) and its supplement, the Clayton Antitrust Act (1914), the Tunney Act further specified how consent decrees could be used by establishing that the courts must demonstrate that consent decrees serve the "public interest" in antitrust cases filed by the Justice Department. In regard to antitrust decrees, the first consent decree used in antitrust regulation under the Sherman Antitrust Act was Swift & Co. v. United States in which the Court used its power under the Commerce Clause to regulate the Chicago meat trust as an unlawful economic monopoly. In Standard Oil Company of New Jersey v. United States, the government used consent decrees to dissolve the horizontal monopoly that John D. Rockefeller had established. Other examples of antitrust consent decrees can be found in a wide range of areas, including their involvement in corporations specializing in technology, the film industry, and the motor vehicle industry.

=== Structural reform ===
==== School desegregation ====
The effort to desegregate American public schools began in 1954 with Brown v. Board of Education. This landmark Supreme Court case established that racial segregation of children in public schools was in violation of the Equal Protection Clause of the Fourteenth Amendment, which requires that states must not "deny to any person within its jurisdiction the equal protection of the laws". To properly enforce this legislation, the Supreme Court allowed district courts to use desegregation decrees obligating states to actively transition into racially nondiscriminatory school systems, with "all deliberate speed". Since the original decree did not include specific ways this could be done, beginning with Swann v. Charlotte-Mecklenburg Board of Education in 1971, the Supreme Court specifically defined the objective as eliminating "all vestiges of state imposed segregation" within school systems, including the limited use of busing, racial quotas, the creation of magnet schools and judicial placement of new schools, and the redrawing of school attendance zones. To stop judicial intervention in schools and end the consent decree through a court order, districts must demonstrate desegregation within six criteria defined in the Green v. County School Board of New Kent County ruling – which include, student assignment, faculty, staff, transportation, extracurricular activities, and facilities.

==== Police use of violence ====
Consent decrees have been signed by a number of cities concerning their police departments' use-of-force policies and practices, including Chicago, New Orleans, Oakland, Los Angeles (whose consent decree was lifted in 2013), Baltimore, Ferguson, Missouri, Seattle, Portland, and Albuquerque. On June 16, 2023, Minneapolis officials promised to enter into negotiations for a consent decree to be enforced by the DOJ in response to a scathing June 2023 US Department of Justice report resulting from a multiyear federal investigation into the "patterns and practices" of Minneapolis Police Department following the May 25, 2020 murder of George Floyd by MPD officers.

=== Public law ===
Consent decrees have been used to remedy various social issues that deal with public and private organizations, where a large number of people are often concerned even if they may not be members of either party involved. Examples have included Title VII of the Civil Rights Act of 1964, the Americans with Disabilities Act, and environmental safety provisions.

==== Actions under Title VII of the Civil Rights Acts of 1964 ====
Title VII of the Civil Rights Act of 1964 prohibits discrimination by employers on the basis of race, sex, color, religion, or national origin. Most often, the remedies to workplace discrimination carried out under this Act take place in the form of consent decrees, where employers may have to provide monetary awards or introduce policies and programs that eliminate and prevent future discrimination. These may include decrees that require the creation of new recruitment and hiring procedures to gain a more diverse pool of job applicants, upgrading job and promotion assignment systems, or offering training programs focusing on discrimination and diversity. Under the Civil Rights Act of 1964, the Equal Employment Opportunity Commission (EEOC) was created to be a major advocate and enforcer of the previously mentioned Title VII remedies. In a landmark decision in 1973, the EEOC, Department of Labor and AT&T compromised on a consent decree that phased out discrimination within recruiting, hiring and employment methods in regard to minorities and women. This established a precedent for other large, private U.S. companies to avoid litigation and government oversight by creating decrees in cooperation with Title VII.

==== Americans with Disabilities Act ====
The Americans with Disabilities Act (ADA) was a civil rights law passed in 1990 that prohibits discrimination and ensures that people with disabilities have equal access to the opportunities and benefits available to the wider American population. Institutions that violate the requirements of the ADA enter consent decrees typically resulting in a payment from the corporation to those wronged, which may serve to discourage future discrimination, in addition to a change in policy to avoid future payouts. Examples of altered practices through the use of a decree have included restructuring building property or the removal of barriers to allow for physical accessibility for all persons, providing supplemental communication tools such as sign language interpreters for those that are hard of hearing, and eliminating discriminatory practices against those that have a disability.

==== Environmental law ====
Consent decrees have been used to alter environmental policy, one example being the "Flannery Decision", or the Toxics Consent Decree, entered into by the Environmental Protection Agency and the Natural Resources Defense Council, an environmental advocacy group. This decree, signed in 1976, highly restructured the way the EPA dealt with harmful substances by requiring the agency to list and regulate 65 toxic pollutants and to regulate pollutant discharges on an industry-by-industry basis (i.e., effluent guidelines regulations) rather than by singular pollutants. This decree went on to shape the regulations and administration procedures of water policy within the United States, particularly through the Clean Water Act.

== Effects ==
Scholars find advantages and disadvantages to using the consent decree. In addition, consent decrees can affect those outside of the litigants, such as third parties and public interests.

=== Advantages and disadvantages ===
The following are advantages of using consent decrees:

- Save financial costs of litigation: Consent decrees forgo a court trial that allows for both parties and the courts to save legal expenses.
- Save the time of prolonged litigation: The parties and the courts save the time it would take for a court trial to occur and the courts more quickly clear their dockets.
- Ability to get results of a trial: The parties are able to obtain similar results of a court trial, specifically where a change is required to appease the dispute.
- Parties avoid the uncertainties of a trial: Consent decrees forgo a trial and its unknown outcome, the necessity of proof, and any guilt is taken for granted (because no one is accused by the consent decree).
- Parties have control of the remedial plan: Consent decrees allow both parties to have greater latitude in deciding how to remedy their issues. This is an advantage "because the parties, not the court, determine the remedy, [and] the assumption is that the remedy is better suited to the parties' needs".
- More compliance and authoritativeness: Both parties more voluntarily implement their agreements if obtained by consent than by force. Moreover, to fail to act under the consent decree seems to be more a violation of the "law" than if under a contract because the parties are "bound" and not "obligated" by the consent decree. Its authoritativeness is reinforced by the practice that a return to court for a consent decree has a priority in the court queue.
- Sustained judicial oversight and interpretation: Courts can supervise that consent decrees are upheld for an indefinite period of time.

In contrast, the following are disadvantages of using consent decrees:

- Duration: Some argue that "consent decrees often last for too long a period". Although consent decrees are a solution to a particular issue, the context around that issue or the issue itself may change. However, the consent decree is neither as easy to modify nor adapt and thus can become inadequate.
- Ambition: Consent decrees can be an avenue for those seeking to enact a future-oriented change that is more general and not case-specific. Consent decrees are thus used "as a tool of enforcement [that is] less expensive, and sometimes more far-reaching, than adjudication", especially in antitrust cases and those involving public institutions.
- Complexity: Consent decrees can be complex in questions of modification, either before or after it is enacted: "the decree issued by consent cannot be modified, except by consent. Only where the consent has been obtained by fraud or given by mistake will a bill be entertained to set it aside".
- Ambiguity: There is ambiguity in the source of power of the consent decree, the role of judges, and the guidelines for a consent decree. Some see that "neither judges, lawyers, nor parties know exactly what they give or get when a consent decree is entered ... [which may bear] testimony to the negative consequences of the ambiguity that surrounds consent decrees".

=== Third parties and the public interest ===
The consent decree can impact those outside of the parties, who resolve their disputes with a consent decree, especially in settling institutional reform and antitrust cases. From Rufo v. Inmates of the Suffolk County Jail and Swift & Co. v. United States, the Supreme Court acknowledges that "the effects of the decree on third parties and the public interest should be taken into account when determining whether or not a change in fact warrants ... the decree". There is criticism that "the antitrust consent decree is an opaque form of government regulation that operates without many of the checks and balances that constrain and shape ordinary regulatory programs". So, some argue that the use of consent decrees in antitrust cases and with public institutions can negatively affect third parties and public interests.

== Consent decree in popular media ==
Consent decrees have appeared in various forms of popular media, often as plot devices to explore legal and political themes.

In the 2024 TV series Elsbeth, starring Carrie Preston, the intricacies of consent decrees are highlighted. The show, a spinoff of The Good Wife and The Good Fight, follows the lawyer Elsbeth Tascioni as she follows the NYPD where she is assigned to oversee a monitorship or consent decree after some controversial arrests.
