= List of Minneapolis chiefs of police =

There have been 59 police chiefs of the Minneapolis Police Department in the history of Minneapolis, Minnesota. The first was appointed in 1867, when the population of Minneapolis was about 5,000.

== List of police chiefs ==
Sources: 1800s, 1900s
Term	Approx. Years	Chief of Police	Departure	Notable/Related Events
1867	1	H. H. Brackett		
1868	1	Dan A. Day		
1869	1	H. H. Brackett and Stuart Seeley		
1870	1	Dan A. Day		
1871	1	C. L. Peck		Shot by an opium user
1872	1	George C. Kent		
1873	1	R. W. Hanson and Michael Hoy		
1874–1875	2	John H. Noble		
1876–1883	8	A. S. Munger		
1883	1	A. C. Berry		
1884–1885	2	John West		
1886	1	Colonel Charles R. Hill		
1887–1890	3	Board of Police Commissioners	Abolished	
1890	1	Major R. R. Henderson		
1894–1898	5	Vernon M. Smith	Reference: Minutes of the City Council, 1894–1924; Minneapolis City Directories	
1899–1900	1	James G. Doyle	Reference: Minutes of the City Council, 1894–1924	
1901–1902	1	Fred W. Ames	Reference: Minutes of the City Council, 1894–1924	
1902	1	E. F. Waite, to fill vacancy per Ames' resignation	Reference: Minutes of the City Council, 1894–1924	
1903–1904	1	Ed. J. Conroy	Reference: Minutes of the City Council, 1894–1924	
1905–1906	1	James G. Doyle	Reference: Minutes of the City Council, 1894–1924	
1907–1910	1	Colonel Frank T. Corriston	Resigned, "laxity"	
1911–1912	2	Michael Mealey	Reference: Minutes of the City Council, 1894–1924	
1913–1916	4	Oscar Martinson	Reference: Minutes of the City Council, 1894–1924	
1917–1918	2	Lewis Harthill	Reference: Minutes of the City Council, 1894–1924	
1919–1921	3	J.F. Walker	Reference: Minutes of the City Council, 1894–1924	
1921–1923	2	A.C. Jensen	Reference: Minutes of the City Council, 1894–1924	
1925–1927	3	Frank W. Brunskill		Tong wars
1928–1930	2	Harry C. Lindholm		
1931–33	3	William Meehan		Racial integration
1934–35	2	Mike Johannes		Minneapolis Teamsters Strike of 1934
1936–40	5	Frank Forestal		
1941	1	Edward B. Hansen (resigned)	Resigned, mobs	
1942	1	Joe M. Jonas		
1943–44	2	Elmer F. Hillner		
1945	1	Ed Ryan		
1946–48	3	G.W. MacLean		
1949–55	7	Thomas R. Jones		
1956	1	E.I. Walling		
1957–61	3	Milton E. Winslow	Resigned due to a stroke in January 1961	
1961	1	Kenneth Moore		
1961–63	3	E.I. Walling	Resigned	
1964–68	4	Calvin F. Hawkinson	Resigned to Plymouth P.D. (1968-1978)	Established Community Relations Unit
1968–69	1	Donald Dwyer		American Indian Movement
1969–70	2	B.J. Lutz		
1971–73	3	Gordon Johnson		Overweight police
1974	1	Jack McCarthy		
1974–75	2	John R. Jensen		
1976–77	2	Carl E. Johnson		
1978–79	2	Elmer C. Nordlund	Resigned, scandal	Teenage prostitution
1979	1	Donald Dwyer	Temporary	
1980–1988	8	Anthony V. Bouza	Retired	
1989–1994	5	John Laux	Resigned to Bloomington Police Department	Murder of Jerry Haaf, KARE 11 media complaint
1994–2002	9	Robert Olson	Dismissed, contract not renewed	Federal mediation
2002–2006	5	William McManus	Resigned to San Antonio Police Department	
2006–2007 (sworn)- 2012	7	Tim Dolan		I-35W Mississippi River Bridge
2012–2017	5	Janeé Harteau	submitted resignation in the aftermath of the killing of Justine Damond	First female, openly gay, and Native American chief in city history
2017–2022	5	Medaria Arradondo	Announced retirement in December 2021, effective January 15, 2022.	First black police chief. Officer body camera usage made mandatory. Murder of George Floyd and subsequent protest movement.
2022	<1	Amelia Huffman (interim)		Interim Chief of Police
2022–2026	4	Brian O'Hara	Resigned after investigation into conduct	

== List of city marshals ==
There were constables appointed as city marshals of St. Anthony before it was joined to Minneapolis.

Term	Name
1855	Benjamin Brown and L. Turner
1856–57	J. Chapman
1857-1859-1860	John A. Armstrong
1861	J. H. Noble
1862	William Lashells
1863	M. B. Rollins
1864	E. Lippencott and J. M. Shepard
1865–1866	M. W. Getchell
1867–1869	Michael Hoy
1870–1871	L. C. Smith
