= Ophelia Rice =

Ophelia Rice was an African-American activist who arrived in Minnesota via the Underground Railroad. She was involved in a court case against a Minneapolis police officer for violence against her in 1899.

== Biography ==
Rice was born in Mississippi in the 1850s. She came to Minnesota via the Underground Railroad. She became involved in many organizations such as the women's suffrage movement, the Negro State Federated Women's Club, the Women's Christian Temperance Union and Bethesda Baptist Church.

Rice was violently assaulted by a white police officer named Thomas Britt in 1899. The Minneapolis police officer had been questioning her daughter and another young Black girl and when Rice came out of her house, Britt responded with force. She took the issue to the court, alleging that Britt choked her, struck her over the heart, knocked her down three times, and caused her to sustain bodily injury.

The case was covered in the Afro-American Advance, which wrote, "The case of Mrs. Ophelia Rice will be watched with interest by the colored citizens of this city. It is the first case on record in our community where an officer of the law assaulted a respectable citizen without any actual cause and still retained his position." Rice won her court case for assault and battery against Britt.

== Legacy ==
Rice's granddaughter was Virginia Lane Frazier who was one of the first Black women from Minnesota to enlist in the US Army Women's Corps.

Rice's story was shared in the Minnesota PBS film "Paradox: Echoes of Reform and the Minneapolis Police".
