= List of police violence incidents during George Floyd protests =

List of violence committed by police officers during the George Floyd riots

- Part of the George Floyd protests
- Date: May 26, 2020 – November 1, 2020
- Location: United States; Sporadic protests in other countries

There were many incidents of police violence during the George Floyd protests, a series of protests and demonstrations against police brutality and racism in policing. The protests began on May 26, 2020, following the murder of George Floyd, a 46-year-old black man, by Derek Chauvin, a 44-year-old white man employed as a Minneapolis police officer, who knelt on Floyd's neck for 9 minutes and 29 seconds during an arrest the previous day.

Lawyer T. Greg Doucette and mathematician Jason Miller compiled a list of videos posted on Twitter showing evidence of alleged police brutality, which as of July 26, 2020, contained more than 830 videos. Investigative journalism website Bellingcat documented over 140 police violence incidents against journalists during the protests. The U.S. Press Freedom Tracker found there were almost as many press freedom violations in one week as for the entire year in 2019.

== Definitions ==
Police have standard procedures for ways to manage protests that may employ legally warranted forms of violence. In contrast, police brutality is the excessive and unwarranted use of violent force by law enforcement. Brutality is an extreme form of police misconduct or violence and is a civil rights violation. Police brutality can include but is not limited to physical or verbal harassment, physical or mental injury, property damage, inaction of police officers, "indiscriminate use of riot control agents at protests", racial abuse, torture, beatings, and death. Human rights include right to equal protection under the law and the rights to liberty, security, and freedom from discrimination. This article lists incidents of police violence during George Floyd protests that may or may not have been legally warranted.

== List of incidents ==
Police violence incidents during the George Floyd protests
Date	Location	Details
May 27, 2020	Memphis, Tennessee	An officer was filmed using his police shield to shove a girl.
May 27, 2020	Minneapolis, Minnesota	Police fired projectiles at protesters, damaging a woman's eye.
May 28, 2020	Albuquerque, New Mexico	Police fired tear gas at protesters who followed officers as they made arrests.
May 28, 2020	Denver, Colorado	Peaceful protesters were gassed by police. Elisabeth Epps, a member of the Denver Police use-of-force committee, resigned her post after she was shot by police projectiles.
May 28, 2020	Houston, Texas	A Houston Police Department officer riding a horse was filmed trampling a woman. Mayor Sylvester Turner apologized for the incident. The woman later filed a lawsuit against the Houston Police Department and the city of Houston.
May 28, 2020	Minneapolis, Minnesota	An officer in the tail car of a caravan of squad cars was filmed indiscriminately spraying a chemical agent out the window onto bicyclists and people in a crosswalk.
May 28, 2020	Minneapolis, Minnesota	A reporter from the Des Moines Register was pepper sprayed by police.
May 29, 2020	Atlanta, Georgia	An officer was filmed using his bicycle to shove a woman who was protesting.
May 29, 2020	Atlanta, Georgia	An officer was filmed body-slamming a woman near Lenox Square Mall. The woman later sued the city of Atlanta.
May 29, 2020	Columbus, Ohio	Police fired a non-lethal projectile at a man, striking and shattering his knee.
May 29, 2020	Columbus, Ohio	A woman was hit by a police horse. The city of Columbus later agreed to pay $5.75 million to injured protesters.
May 29, 2020	Columbus, Ohio	Police pepper-sprayed and shoved a reverend.
May 29, 2020	Columbus, Ohio	Police fired a wooden bullet at a woman near a protest, striking her in the chin.
May 29, 2020	Dallas, Texas	A CBS news crew was caught in tear gas.
May 29, 2020	Denver, Colorado	KMGH-TV news crew reported police targeting them with paintballs and tear gas. Their photographer was shot four times and their camera was destroyed.
May 29, 2020	Denver, Colorado	Police fired a sponge-tipped projectile at a protester, hitting her eye.
May 29, 2020	Denver, Colorado	Police shot tear gas at a couple in a vehicle waiting at a traffic stop in Denver. When the man came out of the vehicle to confront the officers because his pregnant wife was in the vehicle, the officers ordered him to move along. He refused and the officers opened fire on him and the vehicle with pepper balls.
May 29, 2020	Las Vegas, Nevada	80 people were arrested as police clashed with protesters on the Vegas strip, including two journalists. Charges against the two journalists were later dropped.
May 29, 2020	Las Vegas, Nevada	Officers were filmed rushing and tackling a protester. The Las Vegas Metropolitan Police Department said the man was an agitator.
May 29, 2020	Louisville, Kentucky	A Louisville Metro Police Department officer was filmed firing pepper balls directly at a WAVE 3 News crew, hitting correspondent Kaitlin Rust and photojournalist James Dobson. The officer was reassigned on June 1.
May 29, 2020	Minneapolis, Minnesota	CNN journalist Omar Jimenez and his three-person news crew were arrested by a group of Minnesota state police officers while reporting live on protests in response to the murder of George Floyd in Minneapolis, Minnesota. According to Jimenez, he was arrested for failing to move back from the position where they were reporting after being ordered to, despite their media credentials being visible and valid, and their agreeing to move where directed.
May 29, 2020	Minneapolis, Minnesota	Swedish Expressen correspondent Nina Svanberg was shot with a rubber bullet and VG photojournalist Thomas Nilsson had a red laser sight trained on him.
May 29, 2020	Minneapolis, Minnesota	Journalist and author Linda Tirado was permanently blinded in one eye after police shot her with a non-lethal projectile.
May 29, 2020	New York City, New York	New York City Police Department officer Vincent D'Andraia shoved a woman, Dounya Zayer, to the ground at a protest in Brooklyn. The officer was recorded throwing down the protester with both hands while allegedly calling her a "stupid fucking bitch"; the protester was hospitalized after the assault and said she suffered a seizure. On June 9, the officer was charged with assault, criminal mischief, harassment and menacing. A $387 thousand settlement was reached in 2022.
May 29, 2020	New York City, New York	As police cars drove past protesters, an officer opened his passenger door, causing it to hit a protester. The suspected perpetrator received modified duty.
May 29, 2020	New York City, New York	Outside Barclays Center, police were filmed repeatedly striking protesters with clubs after they had fallen on the concrete.
May 29, 2020	Omaha, Nebraska	A man was shot in the eye with a pepper ball. A different person was shot by pepper balls in the groin, although it is not known exactly what date this occurred.
May 29, 2020	Omaha, Nebraska	Police fired tear gas at a line of protesters sitting in the street.
May 29, 2020	Pittsburgh, Pennsylvania	An officer threw a pepper spray container at a man.
May 29, 2020	San Jose, California	San Jose Police Department officer Jared Yuen drew national attention on social media due to videos of his behaviour. Yuen was videoed holding a projectile launcher, telling a protester "Shut up, bitch", then within seconds he leaned around another officer to fire a projectile at close range, which caused a fight. In other videos, Yuen is filmed saying: "Let's get this motherfucker", or seen "smirking, licking his lips and rocking back and forth, looking a little too excited to be facing off with protesters", reported San Jose Inside. The videos were viewed over 10 million times, and thousands called for Yuen's firing. SJPD chief Eddie Garcia reacted that Yuen "let his emotions get the best of him, and it's not right", but he also called Yuen a "kid" and "good cop", "who has put his life on the line for the city multiple times." As a result, Yuen was removed from protest duties.
May 29, 2020	San Jose, California	A bias trainer was shot in the groin by riot guns.
May 29, 2020	San Jose, California	A former San Jose Planning Commissioner was pushed to the ground and repeatedly shot with impact munitions by police.
May 30, 2020	Albany, New York	Police used tear gas after a protest turned violent. Tear gas spread into a nearby home, causing a resident who inhaled some of it to suffer lingering health effects.
May 30, 2020	Atlanta, Georgia	Officers from the Atlanta Police Department pulled two black students from their car, broke a car window, and used tasers to shock them. This came after officers arrested a classmate of theirs whom they wanted to pick up; an officer ordered the students to continue driving, which they complied with. One officer claimed that one of the students possessed a gun, but no gun was found. One of the students stated that he was punched over 10 times in the back after being arrested. Within days, six officers were charged as a result of the incident; two were fired and four were put on administrative leave. The Fulton County District Attorney, Paul Howard, stated that the two college students were "innocent almost to the point of being naive".
May 30, 2020	Austin, Texas	16-year-old Levi Ayala suffered brain damage after being shot in the head with a less-lethal round by Austin police officer Nicholas Gebhart. Gebhart and several other officers were later indicted for shooting protesters with non-lethal projectiles.
May 30, 2020	Austin, Texas	A deaf man was hit by less-lethal projectiles in the ear and crotch.
May 30, 2020	Chicago, Illinois	Journalist Jonathan Ballew was broadcasting the protest when he was allegedly assaulted with a chemical agent.
May 30, 2020	Chicago, Illinois	Police attacked actor John Cusack, who was filming the protest.
May 30, 2020	Chicago, Illinois	An officer beat a woman in her vehicle and wrongfully arrested her. In 2022 the officer faced dismissal for the incident.
May 30, 2020	Cincinnati, Ohio	An officer shoved a man from behind with a shield.
May 30, 2020	Cincinnati, Ohio	A singular protester standing with his hands raised was tear gassed.
May 30, 2020	Cincinnati, Ohio	Police fired pepper balls at a group of 20 people without warning.
May 30, 2020	Cincinnati, Ohio	Police shot a man taking photos in the eye with a marking round, causing the man to suffer vision problems. The man filed an excessive force complained but it was ruled not sustained, as the Citizen Complaint Authority was not able to determine which officer fired the round.
May 30, 2020	Cleveland, Ohio	A man lost sight in one eye after being hit with a beanbag round.
May 30, 2020	Cleveland, Ohio	A sheriff's deputy fired beanbag round at a man passing out water, hitting him in the back of the head. The same deputy fired a beanbag that blinded a different man on the same date. The man hit with the beanbag round later filed a lawsuit.
May 30, 2020	Columbus, Ohio	Columbus Police were filmed pepper spraying Congresswoman Joyce Beatty, Commissioner Kevin Boyce, and Council President Shannon Hardin during a demonstration near the Ohio Statehouse.
May 30, 2020	Columbus, Ohio	22-year-old Sarah Grossman was pepper-sprayed at a demonstration and later died in the hospital from what was determined to be natural causes. An autopsy determined that Sarah Grossman died of coronary artery dissection due to Ehlers–Danlos syndrome.
May 30, 2020	Dallas, Texas	Journalist Kevin Krause photographed a woman who said she had been walking home with groceries when she was struck in the forehead by a police projectile.
May 30, 2020	Dallas, Texas	Brandon Saenz, a 26-year-old black man, was at a protest outside City Hall when he was shot in the face with a non-lethal projectile by police. The projectile shattered the victim's left eye. In 2022 two of the officers who fired projectiles were indicted on multiple counts.
May 30, 2020	Dayton, Ohio	Police fired tear gas and beanbags at protesters. Protesters stated police fired at them without warning, while Dayton's police chief said projectiles were fired in response to water bottles and rocks being thrown.
May 30, 2020	Denver, Colorado	Police shot a protester with a pepperball round, allegedly without provocation, as he filmed them.
May 30, 2020	Denver, Colorado	A non-protester was blinded in one eye after being struck by a police projectile. The victim was walking to his car when he was reportedly shot in the eye, drive-by style, by police.
May 30, 2020	Detroit, Michigan	As a crowd walked away from police, one individual was assaulted by police, physically and verbally. The protester was tackled by a second officer and sprayed by a third.
May 30, 2020	Detroit, Michigan	Police pepper sprayed several reporters.
May 30, 2020	Erie, Pennsylvania	A seated 21-year-old protester was filmed being kicked to the ground by an officer. The officer was suspended on June 15. A final settlement was agreed upon in 2022.
May 30, 2020	Fargo, North Dakota	Police deployed tear gas on protesters.
May 30, 2020	Fort Wayne, Indiana	A protester was shot in one eye and blinded by police. A settlement was reached in 2022.
May 30, 2020	Fort Wayne, Indiana	A three-year-old girl was reported to have been intentionally gassed by police. According to the mother, who was not a protester, the officer "dead-looked at my daughter and threw the canister in front of her and it exploded up into her face."
May 30, 2020	Grand Rapids, Michigan	One officer pepper sprayed a protester and seconds later another fired a tear gas canister into his upper body, hitting him in the shoulder.
May 30, 2020	Greensboro, North Carolina	Police used pepper spray and tear gas on protesters. The police department claimed protesters had been throwing rocks.
May 30, 2020	Harrisburg, Pennsylvania	As people tried to help a fallen protester, they were pepper-sprayed.
May 30, 2020	Kansas City, Missouri	Several officers pepper sprayed a man who was yelling at them from the side of the street. Kansas City Police Chief Rick Smith defended the actions.
May 30, 2020	Kansas City, Missouri	A man was blinded in one eye after being hit by a police projectile. He later sued the city of Kansas City.
May 30, 2020	Kansas City, Missouri	An officer was photographed pepper spraying a man holding a sign above his head.
May 30, 2020	Kansas City, Missouri	Police shot a man with a tear gas canister, causing a compound leg fracture. He later filed a lawsuit against the Missouri State Highway Patrol and several troopers.
May 30, 2020	La Mesa, California	A protester was shot by police with a "less-lethal" bean bag round between her eyes.
May 30, 2020	La Mesa, California	A woman walking near a protest in front of La Mesa's police station was shot in the face by a police projectile.
May 30, 2020	La Mesa, California	A teenager driving his car near the La Mesa Police station was shot in the head by non-lethal projectiles.
May 30, 2020	Lancaster, Pennsylvania	Police threw several protesters to the ground and pepper sprayed others.
May 30, 2020	Las Vegas, Nevada	A videographer sued the Las Vegas Metropolitan Police Department, alleging officers smacked his phone out of his hands and dragged him out of his car.
May 30, 2020	Lawrenceville, Georgia	A Gwinnett County Police officer punched a protester lying on the ground.
May 30, 2020	Los Angeles, California	Two protesters standing in a deserted street were shot by police rubber bullets.
May 30, 2020	Los Angeles, California	An officer shoved a reporter from behind, causing her to trip and hit her head on a fire hydrant.
May 30, 2020	Los Angeles, California	Police struck protesters with batons.
May 30, 2020	Los Angeles, California	A protester was struck in the face by a rubber bullet.
May 30, 2020	Los Angeles, California	Police fired at a veteran who had his hands up at the intersection of Beverly Boulevard and Grove Drive. It was reported in 2022 that the protester who was shot got a $1.25-million settlement.
May 30, 2020	Louisville, Kentucky	A protester was shot in the back of the head by non-lethal projectiles. The man later filed a lawsuit against Louisville Police and State Police.
May 30, 2020	Manassas, Virginia	Virginia Delegate Lee Carter was hit by flash-bangs three times, twice while walking away.
May 30, 2020	Minneapolis, Minnesota	A group of 20 Minneapolis police were filmed marching down a residential street, ordering people on their front porches to go inside. After a few demands, one of the officers shouted "light 'em up!" and marker rounds were shot at them.
May 30, 2020	Minneapolis, Minnesota	Police forced a reporter to the ground and pepper-sprayed him.
May 30, 2020	Minneapolis, Minnesota	Veteran news photographer Tom Aviles was shot with a rubber-bullet and arrested.
May 30, 2020	Minneapolis, Minnesota	Police targeted a CBS news crew and strike a member with non-lethal projectiles.
May 30, 2020	Minneapolis, Minnesota	On May 30 and 31, Minnesota law enforcement slashed the tires of unoccupied vehicles parked near protests. Video of the incidents showed indiscriminate slashing of every vehicle in a Kmart parking lot. Several journalists were affected by the event. The Minnesota State Patrol and the Anoka County Sheriff's Department admitted on June 8 to slashing tires. The Minnesota Department of Public Safety, which oversees the State Patrol stated that tires were slashed in "a few locations", "in order to stop behaviors such as vehicles driving dangerously". The department further stated that some targeted vehicles contained potentially harmful items, to which Snopes commented that there appeared to be a logical "disconnect behind the idea of cutting tires when threatening objects were allegedly located inside" the vehicle.
May 30, 2020	Minneapolis, Minnesota	Police fired rubber bullets at a Swiss team of reporters.
May 30, 2020	Minneapolis, Minnesota	Police fired rubber bullets at a Reuters news crew.
May 30, 2020	Minneapolis, Minnesota	Police hit a journalist in the shin with a rubber bullet.
May 30, 2020	Minneapolis, Minnesota	An officer maced a photojournalist in the face.
May 30, 2020	Minneapolis, Minnesota	Police in an unmarked vehicle encountered 27-year-old Jaleel Stallings and several others guarding a gas station from looting in defiance of the curfew warning. Police fired rubber bullets at the group without warning or announcing themselves as police. Stallings returned fire with actual bullets, but surrendered when police identified themselves. Police beat Stallings for roughly 30 seconds after he surrendered. Stallings was charged with multiple charges including attempted murder but was acquitted in July 2021. In late 2022, Justin Stetson, one of the officers who beat Stallings was charged with third-degree assault. On May 8, 2023, prosecutors offered Stetson a plea deal allowing him to plead guilty to a misdemeanor and avoid jail time, which Stallings objected to. Nonetheless, a judge accepted the plea agreement. Stenson pleaded guilty to third-degree assault and one count of misconduct as a public officer, with the condition he never work as a police officer in Minnesota again. Stenson had already taken a disability retirement in August 2022 and the plea did not affect his state pension.
May 30, 2020	Minneapolis, Minnesota	Officers from the Saint Paul Police Department used tear gas and less lethal projectiles to prevent a crowd of protesters from crossing the Lake Street-Marshall Bridge from Minneapolis to Saint Paul.
May 30, 2020	Minneapolis, Minnesota	Police fired rubber bullets at a group of people outside a gas station. The people were friends and family of the station's owner who were keeping watch on the property after it had been looted.
May 30, 2020	New York City, New York	Two NYPD vehicles were recorded ramming into protesters In April 2022 an oversight agency recommended discipline be taken against the officers involved.
May 30, 2020	New York City, New York	An officer approached a protester, ripped off the protester's mask, and pepper-sprayed the protester in the face.
May 30, 2020	New York City, New York	A medical worker at the Kings County Hospital Center left work and came across officers chasing an individual, and began to record the incident. Officers began to beat the worker for about 90 seconds, causing bruises and a head wound that required seven staples to close.
May 30, 2020	New York City, New York	An officer arrested and struck a Huffington Post reporter with a baton after the reporter insulted the officer.
May 30, 2020	Oakland, California	A reporter was hit in the thigh by a rubber bullet.
May 30, 2020	Philadelphia, Pennsylvania	A police officer was filmed repeatedly striking a journalist with club.
May 30, 2020	Philadelphia, Pennsylvania	A SEPTA Police officer struck two protesters with a baton. The officer was fired in July 2020 and indicted on assault charges in October of that year.
May 30, 2020	Phoenix, Arizona	A photographer was hit in the head and back by police projectiles.
May 30, 2020	Raleigh, North Carolina	Police fired gas and non-lethal projectiles at protesters.
May 30, 2020	Reno, Nevada	Police shot a legal observer from the American Civil Liberties Union with rubber bullets.
May 30, 2020	Richmond, Virginia	Police sprayed a man through the window of his home as he recorded them. It was reported on July 17 that the same man had filed a lawsuit.
May 30, 2020	Rochester, New York	Police fired pepper balls and tear gas canisters at a group of people following the damaging of several police cars.
May 30, 2020	Rockford, Illinois	Police struck a protester with batons and threw him to the ground. The Rockford Police Department stated that a board of police officials determined all officers had acted appropriately.
May 30, 2020	Salem, Oregon	Police used tear gas on protesters after curfew. Prior to the tear gas a police officer was filmed telling armed members of a right-wing group to leave the sidewalk and go inside so "it doesn't look like we are playing favorites."
May 30, 2020	Salt Lake City, Utah	During a live news broadcast, police were filmed shoving an elderly man, causing him to fall to the pavement. The District Attorney decided not to press charges against the officer, saying the man himself did not support criminal charges.
May 30, 2020	Salt Lake City, Utah	An officer was filmed firing a beanbag gun at a man lying on the ground with his hands in the air. A spokesman for the Salt Lake City Police Department said the officer was not one of theirs.
May 30, 2020	San Antonio, Texas	A protester filmed as police shot him twice with less-lethal projectiles without physical provocation.
May 30, 2020	Santa Monica, California	A news crew was hit with tear gas.
May 30, 2020	Seattle, Washington	A seven-year-old child was maced by police, with the aftermath documented by a viral video. Hours after the protest, Seattle police arrested the person who recorded the video.
May 30, 2020	Seattle, Washington	An officer placed his knee on the back of the neck of a suspect; after onlookers shouted for him to remove his knee from the man's neck, his partner pulled it off.
May 30, 2020	Toledo, Ohio	Police fired tear gas and rubber bullets at protesters.
May 31, 2020	Austin, Texas	A pregnant woman was shot by police with projectile.
May 31, 2020	Austin, Texas	20-year-old African American Texas State University student Justin Howell was shot in the head with a less lethal bean bag round by an Austin Police Department officer while protesting outside the police headquarters in Austin, Texas. Fellow protesters were instructed by police to carry the injured Howell toward them for medical aid, however, those protesters were then also fired upon by police. Howell was left in critical condition, with a fractured skull and brain damage. The officer who shot Howell was later indicted for the shooting.
May 31, 2020	Austin, Texas	A woman was shot with lead pellets. Nine officers were later charged in connection with the incident.
May 31, 2020	Austin, Texas	An officer shot a protester with a beanbag projectile as he walked away. The officer was later indicted for the shooting.
May 31, 2020	Boston, Massachusetts	Boston Police were criticized for use of pepper spray during the protests. In one instance, a man with his hands up was pepper sprayed by several officers.
May 31, 2020	Boston, Massachusetts	Multiple people claimed police struck them with batons despite having their hands raised. Four people filed a federal civil rights lawsuit against the city of Boston and three Boston Police officers.
May 31, 2020	Charleston, South Carolina	A kneeling protester was arrested after telling police "I love each and every one of you. I cry at night, because I feel your pain."
May 31, 2020	Chattanooga, Tennessee	Police threw two protesters to the ground and handcuffed them after they pulled on a banner.
May 31, 2020	Chattanooga, Tennessee	Sheriff's deputies threw tear gas from a courthouse balcony. According to Chattanooga Police, they had not been informed that the Sheriff's Office would be using tear gas.
May 31, 2020	Chicago, Illinois	Outside Brickyard Mall, police were filmed swarming a car, smashing its windows, and pulling an occupant to the ground. An investigation was opened.
May 31, 2020	Chicago, Illinois	Chicago Police Board President Ghian Foreman claimed that officers struck him multiple times with batons.
May 31, 2020	Cincinnati, Ohio	Police arrested a tattoo artist and pushed him against a window after curfew. The artist was painting a mural on a building with the owner's permission and was otherwise uninvolved in the protests.
May 31, 2020	Columbia, South Carolina	A protester filed a federal lawsuit after he was hit by tear gas and rubber bullets, the latter of which hit his back.
May 31, 2020	Compton, California	A deputy held a man's head down with a knee, while another repeatedly kicked him. Compton city officials called for the deputies involved to be dismissed.
May 31, 2020	Denver, Colorado	When asked "what is going to happen at 8", an officer replied "What's gonna happen is we're gonna start beating the fuck out of you."
May 31, 2020	Des Moines, Iowa	A reporter was shot in the thigh by a rubber bullet.
May 31, 2020	Detroit, Michigan	An officer fired rubber pellets at a group of photojournalists leaving a protest. The officer was charged but charges were later dropped.
May 31, 2020	El Paso, Texas	A woman was hit in the back of the leg by a beanbag round.
May 31, 2020	Eugene, Oregon	A reporter from Eugene Weekly was hit with tear gas and pellets.
May 31, 2020	Eugene, Oregon	Police fired pepper balls at a man near his home after curfew.
May 31, 2020	Fairmont, West Virginia	Police pepper sprayed several people during an arrest.
May 31, 2020	Fort Lauderdale, Florida	A police officer shoved a woman as she knelt. Video shows one of the officer's coworkers, a black woman, yelling at him after the incident. The officer who shoved the protester was identified and suspended pending investigation. The officer was later charged with battery but was acquitted.
May 31, 2020	Fort Lauderdale, Florida	A woman was shot in the face with a rubber bullet. According to police the detective was aiming at a different person when the woman accidentally walked into the line of fire.
May 31, 2020	Fredericksburg, Virginia	Police used tear gas about two minutes after an unlawful assembly was declared. An internal review concluded that police actions were justified, but a later independent review determined that police were too quick to deploy tear gas. A group of protesters filed a lawsuit against the city of Fredericksburg.
May 31, 2020	Hobart, Indiana	During a protest near the Southlake Mall, police fired multiple pellets at a man walking to his car, before arresting and siccing a dog on him. Police also used tear gas on protesters.
May 31, 2020	Huntington Beach, California	Police used pepper balls on protesters kneeling and lying on a street.
May 31, 2020	Indianapolis, Indiana	The Indianapolis Metropolitan Police Department was filmed arresting two women, with a male officer holding one of them. The officer's arm was positioned near her chest. She twisted free and took a few steps, officers fired pepper balls at her feet and struck her with batons. An officer then pressed her to the ground with his hand and a baton resting on her neck. When questioned by another woman, an officer shoved that woman back before she was subdued by police. Multiple officers involved in this incident were reassigned on June 5. The two women filed a lawsuit on June 29. Two of the officers were indicted in August.
May 31, 2020	Indianapolis, Indiana	Peaceful protesters, including a church group, were tear gassed after police attempted to arrest a man vandalizing a statue. Indianapolis's police chief apologized to the group.
May 31, 2020	Jacksonville, Florida	An officer was filmed punching a protester near a courthouse.
May 31, 2020	Lafayette, Indiana	Police used tear gas on protesters outside the Tippecanoe County Courthouse. According to the Journal & Courier the use of tear gas came without warning, although the sheriff said he gave the order after an explosive was set off near the courthouse.
May 31, 2020	Lakeland, Florida	Police used tear gas and pepper spray on protesters. One man was pepper sprayed seconds after he finished a live interview with a local news station.
May 31, 2020	Lansing, Michigan	Police threw tear gas canisters at a crowd of protesters, including City Councilman Brandon Betz.
May 31, 2020	Lincoln, Nebraska	Multiple people were stuck by non-lethal projectiles. Three people who were hit by projectiles filed lawsuits against the city of Lincoln.
May 31, 2020	Long Beach, California	A journalist was shot in the throat by a police rubber bullet.
May 31, 2020	Long Beach, California	Police fired a projectile at a woman filming, causing her to lose part of her finger. She later filed a lawsuit against the Long Beach Police Department.
May 31, 2020	Los Angeles, California	A US Marine Corp veteran was seriously injured after being shot in head by police with a rubber bullet.
May 31, 2020	Los Angeles, California	A police vehicle struck a protester after a crowd surrounded it.
May 31, 2020	Louisville, Kentucky	An arrested protester claims police pulled him from a vehicle and hit him with batons.
May 31, 2020	Madison, Wisconsin	Police tear gassed and pepper sprayed two reporters from the Milwaukee Journal Sentinel.
May 31, 2020	Miami, Florida	Police grabbed a protester and shoved him to the ground before one put the protester in a chokehold. A report of the incident claims that no force was used.
May 31, 2020	Miami, Florida	Police threw a social media producer for WSVN against a truck and arrested him. Charges against the producer were later dropped.
May 31, 2020	Minneapolis, Minnesota	Police cruisers were filmed spraying a chemical on crowds of protesters as they drove by.
May 31, 2020	Minneapolis, Minnesota	Police fired a projectile at a man near a highway on-ramp, striking him and causing him to lose vision in one eye. The man later received a $2.4 million settlement.
May 31, 2020	Mobile, Alabama	Police fired pepper balls at protesters. In addition police forced one man to his knees while arresting him for walking in a road.
May 31, 2020	Montreal, Canada	Police used tear gas on protesters. According to CTV News Montreal is the only major Canadian city to have deployed tear gas on demonstrators.
May 31, 2020	Murfreesboro, Tennessee	Police used tear gas on a group of protesters standing in an intersection, including some children. The mayor of Murfreesboro defended tear gas use, saying it was necessary to remove protesters blocking the intersection.
May 31, 2020	New Haven, Connecticut	Police pepper sprayed protesters who attempted to enter police headquarters and speak to Mayor Justin Elicker. A councilman from nearby Hamden claimed police shoved one person down the stairs and hit another with a riot shield.
May 31, 2020	New York City, New York	A hospital worker returning home from work was beaten by police.
May 31, 2020	New York City, New York	An officer struck a man with a baton, breaking bones in his face.
May 31, 2020	New York City, New York	Police repeatedly struck two women with batons.
May 31, 2020	Oklahoma City, Oklahoma	A woman was shot in the arm by a rubber bullet. She later filed a lawsuit against the city of Oklahoma City.
May 31, 2020	Phoenix, Arizona	A police trainee fired a beanbag round at a man in the Garfield Historic District, breaking part of the man's forearm. The man later sued the city of Phoenix and its police chief.
May 31, 2020	Phoenix, Arizona	Police arrested a woman who was standing in front of her home and took her to the ground.
May 31, 2020	Richmond, Virginia	Two officers pepper sprayed three women in a car at an intersection. The two officers were indicted, but charges against them were later dismissed.
May 31, 2020	Sacramento, California	A teen was shot in the face with a rubber bullet.
May 31, 2020	Sacramento, California	A legal observer was hit above the eye with a pepper ball.
May 31, 2020	Salem, Oregon	An officer fired rubber bullets at a woman, causing vision loss and a chest injury. The woman was later awarded $1 million following a lawsuit.
May 31, 2020	San Bernardino, California	Police fired "many rounds" of tear gas and rubber bullets at crowds after reports of fires and violence.
May 31, 2020	San Diego, California	Police hit a man with a baton and shot him with bean bags. The city of San Diego said the people seen firing projectiles in the man's videos were sheriff's deputies, though the San Diego County Sheriff's Department stated they did not send officers to the protest. A lawsuit was settled in 2023.
May 31, 2020	San Francisco, California	Video appears to show a sheriff's deputy shove a protester from behind on a sidewalk.
May 31, 2020	Santa Monica, California	A man was hit in the back with a rubber bullet. Police also zip tied and arrested protesters, including actor Cole Sprouse.
May 31, 2020	Santa Rosa, California	An officer fired a plastic sting-ball grenade at a protester from less than 15 feet away. The protester suffered a broken jaw and four of his front teeth were knocked out. The officer was later suspended for 20 hours.
May 31, 2020	Santa Rosa, California	An officer fired a rubber bullet at a man who suffered a ruptured testicle and required emergency surgery. According to findings by the Santa Rosa Police Department the rubber bullet used was not authorized for crowd control. The officer was later suspended for 20 hours.
May 31, 2020	Santa Rosa, California	An officer fired a rubber bullet at a man, striking him in the forehead. In September 2021 the city of Santa Rosa agreed to pay the man $105,000 following a lawsuit.
May 31, 2020	Spokane, Washington	Police fired tear gas at a group of kneeling protesters. Police were responding to reports of looting at a nearby Nike store.
May 31, 2020	Spokane, Washington	Police beat a man lying on the ground with his arms raised with a baton. It is not clear what happened before the beating.
May 31, 2020	Tampa, Florida	Police fired a rubber bullet at a man helping others to safety, striking him in the back of the head. In 2021 the man filed a lawsuit against the city of Tampa, claiming he suffered from memory loss and migraines since the incident.
May 31, 2020	Tulsa, Oklahoma	Police fired pepper balls at a KTUL reporter, damaging his camera.
May 31, 2020	Virginia Beach, Virginia	Police deployed tear gas on protesters.
May 31, 2020	Washington, D.C.	President Trump went to the historic St. John's Episcopal Church, whose basement had been damaged by fire, and posed for pictures in front of it holding up a Bible. To clear the route so that Trump could walk there, police and national guardsmen used tear gas, rubber bullets, and flash grenades to clear a crowd of peaceful protesters from Lafayette Square, resulting in significant news coverage and denunciation by the bishop of the Episcopal Diocese of Washington.
May 31, 2020	Washington, D.C.	Federal police fired pepper balls at protesters in Lafayette Square. One man was hit in the eye.
May 31, 2020	Waterbury, Connecticut	Police tackled protesters while arresting them. The Waterbury Police Department stated the 28 people arrested were from an "antagonistic" group separate from peaceful protesters.
May 31, 2020	West Palm Beach, Florida	Police fired smoke canisters and rubber bullets at protesters. According to The Palm Beach Post police began firing rubber bullets and smoke canisters right after police announced a curfew.
May 31, 2020	Wilmington, North Carolina	Police fired tear gas at protesters a street length away.
June 1, 2020	Asbury Park, New Jersey	Police shoved a woman to the ground and arrested a reporter. The reporter was later released and his charges dropped.
June 1, 2020	Asheville, North Carolina	Police targeted street medics in the crowd during protests at Pack Place, using rubber bullets and tear gas. At least one street medic and several protesters were injured by pepper balls and rubber bullets.
June 1, 2020	Athens, Georgia	Police tear gassed a group of protesters after curfew.
June 1, 2020	Beavercreek, Ohio	Police fired four rounds of tear gas at protesters near the police station.
June 1, 2020	Bentonville, Arkansas	Police fired tear gas and rubber bullets at protesters.
June 1, 2020	Buffalo, New York	Police tackled a man from behind as he was being interviewed by a news station.
June 1, 2020	Chicago, Illinois	An officer was filmed punching a man after shoving him to the ground.
June 1, 2020	Cincinnati, Ohio	A reporter from The Cincinnati Enquirer was forced to the ground and handcuffed. The reporter was released shortly after.
June 1, 2020	Colorado Springs, Colorado	Police were filmed firing less-lethal rounds at a man and punching him. Colorado Springs Police chief Vince Niski announced an investigation would be conducted.
June 1, 2020	Columbus, Ohio	Journalists were pepper sprayed by police.
June 1, 2020	Conway, Arkansas	Police used tear gas on protesters.
June 1, 2020	Des Moines, Iowa	A journalist was sprayed by police. Police announced they would conduct an "internal review".
June 1, 2020	Des Moines, Iowa	Police gassed and arrested a reporter for Iowa's KCCI.
June 1, 2020	Des Moines, Iowa	Police pushed, pepper sprayed, and beat protesters. A regional director from the American Civil Liberties Union accused police of kettling protesters and using excessive force against a child, journalists, and a legal observer.
June 1, 2020	Huntsville, Alabama	Police fired tear gas at protesters.
June 1, 2020	Joliet, Illinois	Mayor Bob O'Dekirk personally scuffled with a protester, aided by police.
June 1, 2020	Kalamazoo, Michigan	Police fired tear gas at a group of people lying on the ground. Police claim the group had been looting and destroying property, while protesters disputed this.
June 1, 2020	Little Rock, Arkansas	State Police fired a bean bag projectile at a man leaving a protest outside the Arkansas State Capitol. In June 2022 the man filed a lawsuit against the State Police.
June 1, 2020	Los Angeles, California	Video shows deputies shooting pepper balls at a group of fleeing skateboarders in Hollywood.
June 1, 2020	Los Angeles, California	Police handcuffed and arrested store owners and bystanders who were protecting a looted store.
June 1, 2020	Louisville, Kentucky	An officer fired pepper balls at a person standing on private property. The Department of Justice later indicted the officer for excessive force.
June 1, 2020	Louisville, Kentucky	Local chef David McAtee was fatally shot by the Kentucky National Guard.
June 1, 2020	Oakland, California	Police used tear gas on protesters. About a year later in 2021 police chief LaRonne Armstrong apologized for the use of tear gas and announced that more than 33 disciplinary actions had been issued to officers who deployed it.
June 1, 2020	Philadelphia, Pennsylvania	Protesters were filmed kneeling with hands up as police pulled their mask and goggles off and sprayed them. A Philadelphia Police officer was later charged with simple assault and reckless endangerment. A mistrial was declared on May 8, 2023, and it was ruled the following August the officer's trial would be held outside of the state.
June 1, 2020	Philadelphia, Pennsylvania	A Temple University student was released from custody on June 3, after his arrest on June 1, on charges of assaulting an officer. Video showed an officer striking him in the head with a baton and another placing his knee on the back of his neck/head to pin the student's face to the street. The officer who used a baton, Police Staff Inspector Joseph Bologna, was suspended and charged with aggravated assault. Other incidents caught on video involving Bologna regarding the 2020 protests saw him tackling a female protester who had touched his bicycle, lunging at a journalist, and hitting a security guard. Bologna was later fired, and multiple lawsuits were filed against him.
June 1, 2020	Philadelphia, Pennsylvania	Protesters on the I-676 were hit with tear gas from both sides of the highway. In 2023 the city of Philadelphia announced a $9.25 million settlement for protesters affected by tear gas, rubber bullets, and zip ties.
June 1, 2020	Pittsburgh, Pennsylvania	An officer fired at a protester 20 feet from a police line.
June 1, 2020	Portland, Maine	Police pepper-sprayed demonstrators in an attempt to disperse a large crowd. 23 people were arrested.
June 1, 2020	Portland, Oregon	A man was shot in the leg with a foam munition at close range.
June 1, 2020	Raleigh, North Carolina	Police fired projectiles at a bar owner and staff members.
June 1, 2020	Richmond, Virginia	Police fired tear gas at demonstrators kneeling at the Robert E. Lee Monument 20 minutes before curfew.
June 1, 2020	Riverside, California	News broadcast footage purported to show police smashing a car window. The sheriff's department claimed windows were not broken.
June 1, 2020	San Luis Obispo, California	Police used tear gas on protesters. A report noted that protesters had only one way to disperse from the standoff, to turn around and go back. One protester stated they were hit in the foot and leg by a canister.
June 1, 2020	Seattle, Washington	As she broadcast live on-air, NBC reporter Jo Ling Kent was struck by a flash-bang grenade from police.
June 1, 2020	St. Matthews, Kentucky	Police pushed and held down a pastor during a march. The pastor was released after officers learned he was a pastor. He later filed a lawsuit against the city and its police department.
June 1, 2020	Syracuse, New York	An officer shoved a news photographer from Syracuse.com to the ground.
June 1, 2020	Topeka, Kansas	Police used tear gas on protesters. Some members of the media were also caught in the tear gas.
June 1, 2020	Walnut Creek, California	Police fired tear gas and sicced police dogs on protesters. One woman was struck in the head by a rubber bullet.
June 1, 2020	Washington, D.C.	An Australian Seven News crew conducting a live broadcast, were battered by police using a riot shield and clubs, while the cameraman was punched in the face. The incident prompted comment from the Australian Prime Minister and Opposition Leader. The reporter later testified in front of US Congress.
June 1, 2020	Washington, D.C.	Despite clearly showing press credentials, complying with police instructions, and the curfew not yet being in effect: an MPD officer; unprovoked, charged a BBC cameraman with a riot shield, knocking him backwards.
June 1, 2020	Worcester, Massachusetts	An officer tackled a protester walking home.
June 1, 2020	Worcester, Massachusetts	Video appears to show a riot officer repeatedly stepping on a woman's phone as she was arrested. The woman can be heard on video claiming police are punching her boyfriend.
June 1, 2020	Worcester, Massachusetts	Police tackled and arrested a freelance journalist. The journalist was charged with disorderly conduct, disturbing the peace, and failure to disperse, but the charges were later dropped.
June 2, 2020	Asheville, North Carolina	Police were filmed destroying medical supplies.
June 2, 2020	Brockton, Massachusetts	Police pepper sprayed a reporter from The Boston Globe while moving a crowd of protesters back.
June 2, 2020	Charlotte, North Carolina	Protesters claimed police deliberately kettled and tear-gassed them. Multiple lawsuits were filed against the city and the Charlotte-Mecklenburg Police Department.
June 2, 2020	Clayton, California	Police used tear gas and smoke grenades on protesters.
June 2, 2020	Colorado Springs, Colorado	Police tackled two women and slammed one to the ground. One of the women was later awarded a $175,000 settlement for an excessive force lawsuit.
June 2, 2020	Colorado Springs, Colorado	A woman was pepper sprayed multiple times by police. The woman later filed a lawsuit against Colorado Springs and five police officers.
June 2, 2020	Los Angeles, California	A pedestrian was arrested at gunpoint.
June 2, 2020	Los Angeles, California	A wheelchair-using man was shot in the face with a rubber projectile.
June 2, 2020	Milwaukee, Wisconsin	During a six-hour peaceful march from Bay View to the District 1 police station, police officers declared an unlawful assembly after empty water bottles were thrown by individual members of the crowd towards the police, and issued a ten-minute dispersal warning before firing tear gas and rubber bullets on the crowd of protesters. Earlier that same day, a group of protesters led by local organizer Frank Nitty II marched onto the I-794 bypass ramp, and were confronted by law enforcement officers, primarily from the Milwaukee County Sheriff's Department. The group was ordered to halt and dispersed with deployments of tear gas and rubber bullets; Nitty was singled out from the group, had a firearm pointed in his face, was physically assaulted and dogpiled by officers "leaving him bleeding from his right elbow, hand, and wrist, and left arm". Officers tightly bound his wrists, cutting off circulation to his hands, and he was arrested and held in jail. No charges were brought against Nitty other than a County citation for walking onto the freeway; he pled guilty, paid the citation, and was released, before suing the officers involved in the incident. A water bottle thrown at police near the District 1 station that afternoon was later pictured and described as a "molotov cocktail" on the Milwaukee Police Department's Twitter profile; this drew widespread rebukes and was ultimately quietly corrected by MPD leadership.
June 2, 2020	Milwaukee, Wisconsin	Video showed an officer restraining a protester with his knee. The Milwaukee Common Council called for an investigation into the incident.
June 2, 2020	New York City, New York	During a protest in Park Slope an NYPD inspector was filmed stepping on a man's neck. In 2023 the Civilian Complaint Review Board determined the inspector used excessive force and recommended he be terminated.
June 2, 2020	Portland, Oregon	Police fired at least 138 chemical munitions in an 18 block area, far exceeding federally-recognized safe levels of CS gas concentration. This included three types of tear gas.
June 2, 2020	Providence, Rhode Island	An officer fired a non-lethal projectile at a non-protester in a vehicle. The man claims he lost an eye because of the incident. The officer involved was placed on administrative leave.
June 2, 2020	Richmond, Virginia	A group of officers were filmed as one of them appeared to repeatedly spit at a woman in handcuffs.
June 2, 2020	San Jose, California	A protester filed a lawsuit against the San Jose Police Department claiming an officer tripped him before other officers fired non-lethal projectiles at him.
June 2, 2020	San Juan, Puerto Rico	Police used pepper spray on protesters after curfew.
June 2, 2020	Vallejo, California	22-year-old Argentine-American Sean Monterrosa was killed at 12:30 AM while kneeling with his hands raised above his waist when he was shot and killed with five bullets by a police officer. Police stated they mistook a hammer in Monterrosa's pocket for a gun. Police were responding to reported looting.
June 3, 2020	Huntsville, Alabama	Tear gas and rubber bullets were used on peaceful protesters.
June 3, 2020	Iowa City, Iowa	Police used tear gas and flash bangs on protesters. The city council later passed a resolution indicating not to use tear gas and less lethal projectiles on peaceful protesters.
June 3, 2020	New Orleans, Louisiana	A woman was struck in the head by a tear gas grenade. The woman later sued the city of New Orleans and its police department.
June 3, 2020	St. Johnsbury, Vermont	A woman fell down the steps in front of the St. Johnsbury Police Department after an officer pushed her out of the way.
June 3, 2020	Tampa, Florida	An officer on a bicycle knocked down and detained a journalist from the Tampa Bay Times. The journalist was released after 10 to 15 minutes. Tampa mayor Jane Castor later issued an apology to the journalist.
June 3, 2020	Valdosta, Georgia	A brief scuffle occurred after the Lowndes County sheriff attempted to take a sign from a protester.
June 4, 2020	Buffalo, New York	Martin Gugino, a 75-year-old man with a cane, was left bleeding from the head after approaching police officers and being shoved to the ground by the police. A video of the encounter shows an officer leaning down to examine him, but another officer then pulls the first officer away. Several other officers are seen walking by the man, motionless on the ground, without checking on him. In February 2021, a grand jury declined to indict the officers, and in April 2022 they were cleared of wrongdoing.
June 4, 2020	New York City, New York	During a protest in the Mott Haven neighborhood of the Bronx, police kettled protesters and beat them with batons. A class-action lawsuit was settled in 2023.
June 4, 2020	San Diego, California	After a protest, a woman was forcibly dragged into an unmarked car by unidentified men in civilian clothing. Unwilling to reveal where the woman would be taken, one of the assailants threatened bystanders: "You follow us, you will get shot! Do you understand me?!" The San Diego Police Department later confirmed the individuals were law enforcement officers and claimed the woman had hit police with a protest sign.
June 4, 2020	Portland, Oregon	A freelance reporter was hit with a baton and pepper sprayed.
June 5, 2020	Lakewood, California	Police used pepper balls on protesters. Police claim that an object was thrown at them, but protesters disputed this.
June 6, 2020	Sydney, Australia	Police pepper sprayed a crowd of protesters at Central Station. Police also grabbed and restrained a man.
June 8, 2020	Seattle, Washington	At the East Precinct, a 26-year-old protester was shot in the chest with a blast ball as she stood 25 feet from the police line. Her heart stopped and street medics raced her unconscious body away on a makeshift stretcher as flash grenades exploded around them. Following chest compressions she was revived then taken to Virginia Mason Hospital. Though she went into cardiac arrest again at the hospital, doctors were able to keep her alive.
June 9, 2020	Dover, Delaware	Police tackled and arrested a journalist from USA Today.
June 12, 2020	Austin, Texas	The day after Austin Police Department Chief Brian Manley announced that the department would no longer perform chokeholds or neck restraints, an officer detaining 19-year-old Jarrid Cornell knelt on his neck while he was already pinned to the ground by two other officers.
June 12, 2020	Beverly Hills, California	Police used tear gas and sponge-tipped bullets on protesters after an unlawful assembly was declared.
June 12, 2020	East Meadow, New York	As a protester walked surrounded by multiple officers, one of the officers stopped abruptly, causing the protester to bump into them. The swarm of officers then pulled the protester to the ground and placed him under arrest.
June 13, 2020	Las Vegas, Nevada	Police arrested multiple legal observers. One legal observer claimed police threw her to the ground.
June 13, 2020	Richmond, Virginia	A police vehicle hit several protesters near the Robert E. Lee statue on Monument Avenue.
June 15, 2020	Louisville, Kentucky	Police shot at a courthouse security guard as he filmed protests from inside the building.
June 16, 2020	Portland, Oregon	An officer hit a theft suspect with an unmarked police van during a protest. The officer was later indicted.
June 18, 2020	Compton, California	Sheriff's deputies used flash bangs on protesters while clearing them from the rally.
June 18, 2020	Raleigh, North Carolina	Police dragged a teenager to the ground and zip-tied her after she was falsely accused of assaulting an officer. A police motorcycle ran over the teenager's foot prior to the incident. In 2022 a settlement was reached between the girl and the city of Raleigh in a lawsuit.
June 21, 2020	Columbus, Ohio	A double-amputee was sprayed by police.
June 25, 2020	Portland, Oregon	A woman sued the Portland Police Bureau for firing a rubber ball distraction device at her.
June 26, 2020	Portland, Oregon	An officer was filmed knocking several people to the ground after emerging from behind a police line.
June 27, 2020	Tempe, Arizona	Police pepper sprayed protesters and tackled three demonstrators.
June 28, 2020	Aurora, Colorado	Police used pepper spray to disperse a violin vigil for Elijah McClain.
June 28, 2020	Detroit, Michigan	A police SUV drove through a crowd of protesters. Multiple people were injured.
June 28, 2020	Nashville, Tennessee	A State Trooper was seen shoving a protester climbing an eight-foot wall.
July 1, 2020	Des Moines, Iowa	Police arrested several people, including Indira Sheumaker. In June 2022 two officers sued Sheumaker—who had since been elected to city council—and other protesters, accusing them of assaulting officers and putting one in a chokehold. Sheumaker later countersued, accusing officers of putting her in a chokehold and shoving her.
July 1, 2020	Miami, Florida	An officer grabbed a woman's breast as she was arrested.
July 5, 2020	Milwaukee, Wisconsin	As a photographer tracking a protest march passed the Old German Beer Hall restaurant, an off-duty police officer and his wife objected to being photographed, threw beer into the crowd, and fought the group of protesters, resulting in property damage, concussions, and charges of battery and misconduct.
July 5, 2020	West Haven, Connecticut	After a woman drove through a crowd of protesters, police attempted to disperse the crowd, and one man was tackled from behind, tasered, and maced. According to hospital records the man has a fracture in his spine following the incident.
July 11, 2020	Lexington, Kentucky	Police put a man in a chokehold and threw him to the ground. The man filed a lawsuit but a judge dismissed it in 2022.
July 12, 2020	Portland, Oregon	Federal officers shot a protester in the head with an impact munition.
July 15, 2020	Portland, Oregon	In two separate incidents federal law enforcement agents grabbed protesters and forced them into unmarked vans. Both of the protesters were later released.
July 18, 2020	Portland, Oregon	Federal officers were filmed beating Navy veteran Chris David with batons and spraying him with pepper spray. David says he walked over to the officers to talk to them.
July 18, 2020	Portland, Oregon	Police threw a man to the ground. When the man attempted to get up, officers knocked him to the ground again. The man filed a lawsuit that was later settled by the city.
July 20, 2020	Portland, Oregon	An officer from the Federal Protective Service groped a woman's breast and buttocks while arresting her.
July 21, 2020	Portland, Oregon	The chair of Lewis & Clark College's history department was hit in the head with an impact munition and tear gassed.
July 27, 2020	Overland Park, Kansas	Police pulled a man to the ground and arrested several people.
July 25, 2020	Anaheim, California	A police cruiser hit a protester and drove away. The Anaheim Police Department claimed the cruiser hit the man by accident and that the officer drove away because of approaching protesters.
July 25, 2020	Hoover, Alabama	During a protest police arrested a chaplain. Video showed an officer putting his forearm on the back of the chaplain's neck while arresting him.
July 28, 2020	New York City, New York	Police were filmed taking a protester into an unmarked police van. The protester was later released.
July 29, 2020	Springfield, Oregon	Police dragged a man on the ground and hit him in the head as he was being restrained.
August 8, 2020	Stamford, Connecticut	An officer was filmed grabbing a protester from behind. Other officers were filmed throwing a photographer to the ground and shoving a woman on her knees.
August 10, 2020	Nashville, Tennessee	A state trooper forcibly ripped a protester's face mask off. The trooper was later charged with and pleaded no contest to assault.
August 12, 2020	Tampa, Florida	A Black Lives Matter activist was hospitalized after police kneeled on her shoulder.
August 14, 2020	Portland, Oregon	An officer with a nightstick knocked a woman down. The woman later filed a lawsuit.
August 18, 2020	Portland, Oregon	An officer hit a protester in the head with a baton. The officer was later indicted for fourth-degree assault.
August 26, 2020	Madison, Wisconsin	A Dane County Sheriff's Deputy fired tear gas at protesters as they left a protest. According to the Dane County Sheriff, Madison Police did not authorize the use of tear gas.
August 31, 2020	Portland, Oregon	A police officer broke ahead of a police line and tackled a protester who was running away, before repeatedly punching them.
September 5, 2020	Portland, Oregon	Police used tear gas at a protest. When a homeowner told police gas had seeped into his house, where his son and son's friend were, another officer struck the homeowner in the back of the head with a baton.
September 23, 2020	Laramie, Wyoming	A police sergeant hit a protester with her vehicle.
September 23, 2020	Portland, Oregon	An officer shoved a protester to the ground from behind. In 2022 the district attorney announced charges would not be filed against the officer.
September 24, 2020	Seattle, Washington	A police officer was filmed pushing his bicycle over the head of a protester lying on the street.
October 24, 2020	Ithaca, New York	Police pepper sprayed and arrested several protesters outside the police station.
October 29, 2020	Philadelphia, Pennsylvania	Video footage showed a slow-moving SUV being surrounded by police. Officers with batons surrounded the vehicle, broke its windows, pulled its driver and a passenger, Rickia Young and her teenage nephew, from the car, threw them onto the ground, and then pulled Young's 2-year-old son from the backseat. Young had to be taken to the hospital for injuries sustained in the arrest and was later released without charges. The Fraternal Order of Police posted a photo of a policewoman holding Young's son to Twitter and Facebook, claiming that the child had been found wandering the streets and that they were protecting him. The posts were later deleted. The city settled out of court for $2 million in September 2021. One of the officers was later fired and charged with assault, but was acquitted by a jury in 2023.

== See also ==
- 2020 deployment of federal forces in the United States
