= Defund the police =

Slogan supporting reallocation of public safety funds away from policing

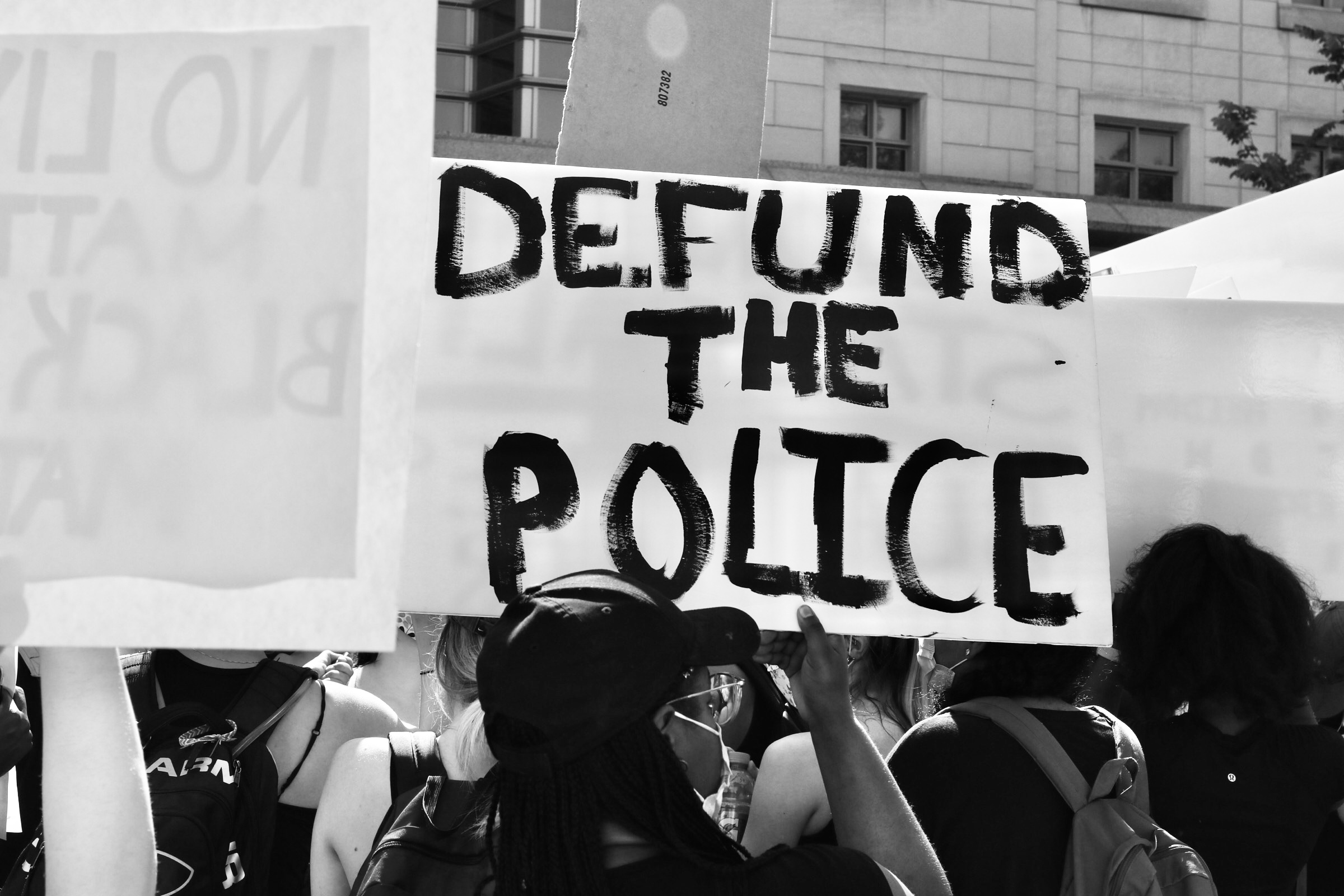
- "Defund the police", a phrase popularized by Black Lives Matter during the George Floyd protests
- Context: George Floyd protests
- Meaning: Divert funding from law enforcement agencies to community outreach

In the United States, "defund the police" is a slogan advocating for reallocating funds from police departments to non-policing forms of public safety and community support initiatives, such as social services, youth programs, housing, education, healthcare, and other community resources. The goals of those using the slogan vary; some support modest budget reductions, while others advocate for full divestment as part of a broader effort to abolish contemporary policing systems. Proponents of defunding police departments argue that investing in community-based programs can more effectively address the root causes of crime, such as poverty, homelessness, and mental health conditions, thereby serving as a better deterrent. Police abolitionists propose replacing traditional police forces with alternative public safety models, emphasizing housing, employment, community health, education, and other social support systems.

The "defund the police" slogan became common during the George Floyd protests starting in May 2020. According to J Wortham, the slogan was popularized by the Black Visions Collective shortly after the murder of George Floyd. Black Lives Matter (BLM), the Movement for Black Lives, and other activists have used the phrase to advocate for reallocating police budgets and delegating certain responsibilities to alternative organizations. In Black Reconstruction in America, first published in 1935, W. E. B. Du Bois wrote about "abolition-democracy", which advocated for the removal of institutions that were rooted in racist and repressive practices, including prisons, convict leasing, and white police forces. In the 1960s, activists such as Angela Davis advocated for the defunding or abolition of police departments. The 2017 book The End of Policing by Alex S. Vitale has been described as a guide for the defund movement.

The police defunding movement has faced criticism from sociologists and criminologists. In the United States, despite its association with left-wing and Democratic Party policies, politicians from both the Democratic and Republican parties have opposed the concept, sometimes advocating instead to refund the police or defend the police. Republicans have sought to link Democrats to the movement during political campaigns. Public opinion in the United States has generally been mixed, with an August 2020 poll in Minneapolis revealing 73% support, while a May 2021 poll indicated 18% support and 58% opposition. A 2024 study found no evidence of significant police defunding in major U.S. cities following the George Floyd protests, while cities with higher Republican vote shares often increased police budgets. According to The New York Times, the movement has failed to achieve substantial policy change, partly due to a lack of clear goals. The slogan itself was deemed unpopular and used to portray activists as lenient on crime.

== Background ==
Since the 1960s, municipal governments have increasingly spent larger portions of their budgets on law enforcement. This is partially rooted in the "war on crime", launched by President Lyndon B. Johnson, which prioritized crime control via law enforcement and prisons. Meanwhile, police unions have wielded significant power in local politics, due to direct endorsements of political candidates and funding of campaigns. Police department budgets have been considered "untouchable" for decades.

By 2020, U.S. cities collectively spent approximately $115 billion per year on policing. In particular, in Los Angeles in 2020, the LAPD budget constituted about 18% of the city's budget ($1.86 billion out of $10.5 billion) and about 54% of the city's general funds (i.e., tax revenues that are not designated for special purposes). In Chicago in 2020, the CPD constituted about 18% of the city's budget and 40% of the city's general funds ($1.6 billion). In New York City in 2020, the NYPD budget constituted about 6% of the city's budget ($5.9 billion out of $97.8 billion), the third largest budget after the Department of Education and the Department of Social Services. In Minneapolis, the budget for the police and corrections departments grew 41% between 2009 and 2019.

As of 2017, state and local government spending on policing has remained just under 4% of general expenditures for the past 40 years. In 2017, over 95% went towards operational costs, such as salaries and benefits. While the officers per capita in major cities have not significantly changed, they have been equipped with more technology, gear, and training in the last few decades. On average, large cities spend about 8% of their general expenditures on policing, 5% on housing, and 3% on parks. Most cities' police budgets are larger than other public safety departments, especially during the COVID-19 pandemic, where other budgets lessened but policing budgets were largely untouched.

== Rationale ==
=== Effectiveness of police ===
Police defunding and abolition activists argue that the police have a poor track record of resolving cases related to murder, rape, and domestic abuse. Some further argue that police social work intervention leads to mass incarceration, risk of physical and mental harm, exposure to violence, and in some instances, death. A 2020 study by The Washington Post found no correlation between annual per capita police funding and per capita rates of violent crime or overall crime.

=== Racism ===
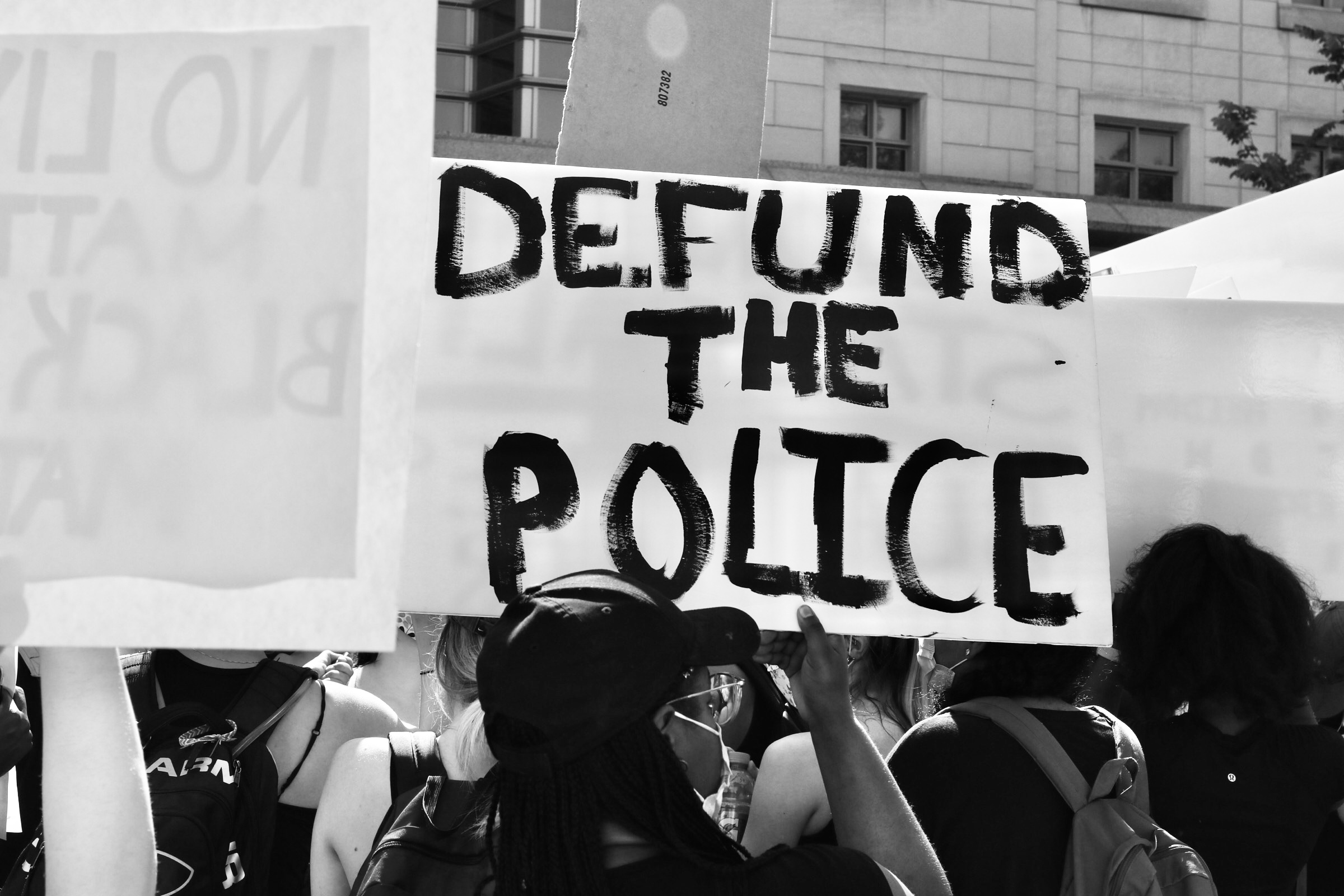
Protest in Ottawa, Ontario, on June 5, 2020

Critics of policing argue that its history is rooted in racist practices, citing slave patrols, enforcement of Jim Crow laws, and repression of the civil rights movement, such as the Selma to Montgomery marches and the government's violent campaign against Black Panther Party leaders such as Fred Hampton.

=== Unbundling of services ===
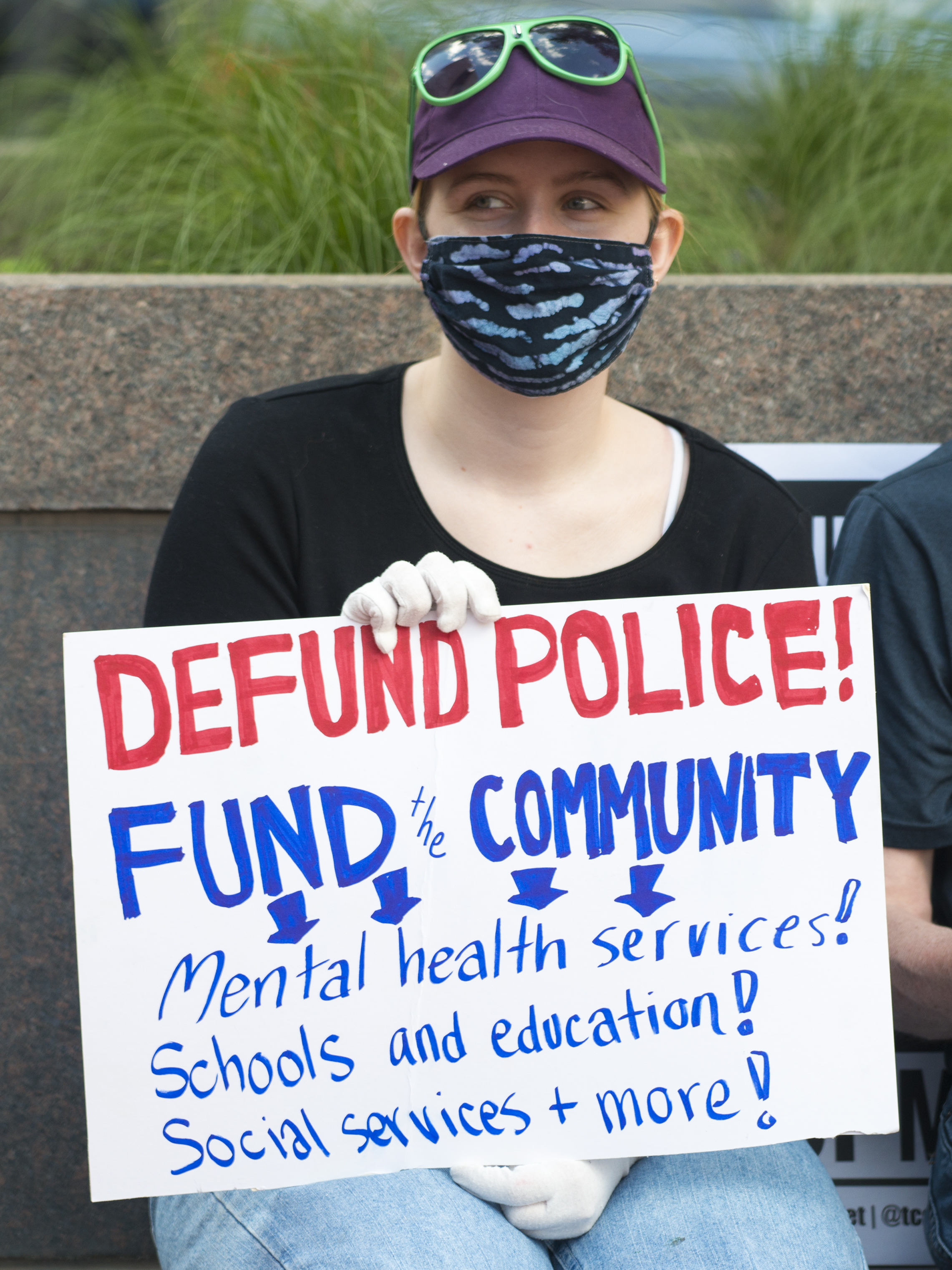
Protester in Minneapolis on June 11, 2020

Critics argue that police officers and departments are tasked with an overly broad range of responsibilities, leading to an over-reliance on law enforcement to address complex social issues such as homelessness, mental health crises, and substance abuse. To address this, some activists advocate for the "unbundling" of services, a model in which specialized response teams take over many responsibilities traditionally assigned to police. These teams could include social workers, emergency medical technicians, conflict resolution specialists, restorative justice teams, and other community-based professionals.

Police officers may be particularly badly suited for some community issues, such as mental health crises. One in four people who are killed by the police have severe mental illness. Some activists argue that mental health professionals may be more appropriate responders in non-emergency situations involving mental health crises. They also suggest that diverting funds to mental health treatment and support could lead to improved outcomes.

A 2020 paper by researchers at the RAND Corporation argues that the police are often given too many roles in society and asked to solve issues that they are not properly trained for and that would be better suited for professionals such as mental health, homelessness, drug abuse, and school related violence. A September 2020 paper by Taleed El-Sabawi of Elon University School of Law and Jennifer J. Carroll of North Carolina State University outlines the considerations in setting up such programs and includes model legislation.

The 2021 American Rescue Plan allocated approximately $1 billion to reimburse 85% of costs for local governments implementing such programs. As of April 2021, at least 14 cities had expressed interest in these initiatives. While the movement primarily originates from left-wing police abolition scholars and activists, it has also garnered support from libertarians. Although libertarians typically avoid using the slogan "defund the police," they support the movement due to concerns about constitutional rights and opposition to the expanding powers of state actors, such as qualified immunity.

=== Effect on crime ===
The connection between defunding police and increases in crime rates has been debated by scholars and policy experts. Criminologist Richard Rosenfeld argued that the rise in violent crime following the George Floyd protests was more linked to the COVID-19 pandemic than to calls for police defunding. He noted that while violent crime rates increased, property crime rates decreased, suggesting a connection to COVID-19 lockdowns rather than policing policies.

Patrick Sharkey, another criminologist, attributed the increase in crime to the Ferguson effect, suggesting that when police reduce their active presence in public spaces, violence can rise due to the absence of that control. In 2021, after Republican U.S. Representative Michael McCaul said reallocating police resources had led to an increased rate of homicides in Austin, Texas, fact-checkers concluded that it was difficult to attribute the rise in the homicide rate solely to reallocations of police funding. A 2013 study found decreased policing leads to increased crime with highest increases for homicide and robbery through decreased deterrence.

== Responses ==
=== Social scientists in 2020 ===
Sociologist Patrick Sharkey has argued that police are effective at reducing violence and that there is substantial evidence that community organizations can play a central role in maintaining public safety. Sharkey stated, "Police presence can reduce violence, but there are lots of other things that reduce violence, too," including business improvement districts and university security organizations. He suggested that relying less on police could lead to safer communities, emphasizing the potential for residents and local organizations to take over many policing functions, thereby building stronger neighborhoods. Sharkey claimed that law-and-order policies and mass incarceration had been effective in reducing violence and highlighted their "staggering costs," proposing a model where residents and local organizations are the primary actors in ensuring safety, with police playing a more limited role focused on violent crime.

Criminologists Justin Nix and Scott Wolfe cautioned against drastic budget cuts or disbanding police departments writing for The Washington Post, arguing that such actions could increase crime and disproportionately harm minority communities. They wrote that cities with more police officers per capita often have lower crime rates. They advocated for greater accountability in police spending, the use of evidence-based practices, and a reconsideration of the wide range of responsibilities currently assigned to police. They stressed that infrastructure must be in place to handle social issues before reallocating police funds.

Kevin Robinson, a retired police chief and lecturer of criminology and criminal justice at Arizona State University, described the slogan "defund the police" as misguided. He suggested that "re-allocation" of specific portions of police department budgets would be a more accurate term. Robinson argued that a thorough review of police department spending was essential and that program effectiveness should determine whether a program continues. Robinson noted that criminals often consider the likelihood of apprehension when committing crimes, stating that "if there is a low likelihood of apprehension, there will be more crimes committed—more people victimized." He emphasized that studies show effective social programs can reduce criminality in both adults and juveniles and encouraged police departments to integrate social programs into their work to address underlying causes of crime. Sociologist Rashawn Ray, writing for the Brookings Institution, stated that much of what police do was misaligned with their skillset and training, and suggests that a reduction in their workload would increase their ability to solve violent crimes. He further stated:

One consistent finding in the social science literature is that if we really want to reduce crime, education equity and the establishment of a work infrastructure is the best approach. A study using 60 years of data found that an increase in funding for police did not significantly relate to a decrease in crime. Throwing more police on the street to solve a structural problem is one of the reasons why people are protesting in the streets. Defunding police—reallocating funding away from police departments to other sectors of government—may be more beneficial for reducing crime and police violence.

=== Media ===
In June 2020, Matthew Yglesias, writing for Vox, criticized police defunding and abolition activists for not presenting a clear plan to address violent crime and for disregarding research showing that increased police presence correlates with reduced violent crime. He argued that dismissing police reform overlooked evidence that modest reforms can reduce misconduct. Yglesias suggested that increased social spending to reduce crime does not necessarily have to come from police budgets. He highlighted that the United States has 35% fewer police officers per capita than the global average and warned that abolishing public police services could lead to increased reliance on private security.

Christy E. Lopez, in a November 2020 column for The Washington Post, supported defunding the police, emphasizing that reform alone is insufficient. She explained that defunding involves narrowing the scope of police responsibilities and shifting many public safety functions to other entities better equipped to handle them. This includes increased investments in mental health care, housing, community mediation, and violence interruption programs. In September 2020, Al Sharpton remarked: "We need to reimagine how we do policing. But to take all policing off is something a latte liberal may go for as they sit around the Hamptons discussing this as an academic problem. But people living on the ground need proper policing."

=== Public opinion ===
A YouGov poll conducted on May 29–30, 2020, found that fewer than 20% of American adults supported reducing funding for police departments, with similar levels of support across Republicans and Democrats. An ABC News/Ipsos poll conducted on June 10–11, 2020, with 686 participants, found that 34% of U.S. adults supported "the movement to 'defund the police,'" while 64% opposed it. Support was higher among Black respondents (57%) compared to White (26%) and Hispanic respondents (42%) and higher among Democrats (55%) than Republicans or Independents.

A Gallup survey conducted between June 23 and July 6, 2020, found that 81% of Black Americans and 86% of respondents overall wanted police to spend the same or more time in their neighborhoods. The survey also found that 47% of Americans supported diverting police funds to other social services. Support varied by race and ethnicity, with 70% of Black Americans, 49% of Hispanic Americans, and 41% of White Americans in favor. A 2021 Pew Research Center found that 15% of U.S. adults supported decreasing police funding, including 23% of Black Americans, 16% of Hispanic Americans, and 13% of White Americans. A 2022 Gallup poll found that 35% of Americans supported reallocating police funds to other services, with 50% of Black Americans favoring this policy.

=== Politicians ===
==== Democratic Party ====
Joe Biden, the presumptive Democratic presidential nominee who would go on to win the 2020 election, opposed defunding police forces, arguing instead that policing needed substantial reform. In his State of the Union Address of 2022, Biden drew bipartisan approval when he said: "We should all agree: The answer is not to defund the police. It's to fund the police". U.S. Senator Bernie Sanders also opposed defunding, arguing for more accountability for police, along with better education and training, and making their job better defined. U.S. Senator Cory Booker said he understood the sentiment behind the slogan but would not use it. U.S. Representative and Congressional Black Caucus chair Karen Bass said, "I do think that, in cities, in states, we need to look at how we are spending the resources and invest more in our communities. Maybe this is an opportunity to re-envision public safety."

On November 9, 2020, House Majority Whip Jim Clyburn stated that the slogan "Defund the police" was "killing our party" and urged Democrats to stop using it. Clyburn compared the phrase to the 1960s protest slogan "burn, baby, burn," arguing that such rhetoric had undermined broader support for addressing racial injustice. A minority of the progressive lawmakers within the Democratic Party including Ilhan Omar, Rashida Tlaib, and Alexandria Ocasio-Cortez support defunding the police, and have called for dismantling police departments. Tlaib in particular has argued that "policing in our country is inherently and intentionally racist", and called for more aggressive action.

In a December 2020 interview with journalist Peter Hamby, former U.S. President Barack Obama said that using "defund the police" may cause politicians to lose support and make their statements less effective. In 2021, the Biden administration argued that Republicans were trying to defund the police due to their opposition to the American Rescue Plan in Congress. A Republican bill in the House of Representatives would cut funding for the Federal Bureau of Investigation and the Justice Department, prompting Representative Matt Cartwright (D-PA) to ask, "Who's defunding the police now?"

==== Republican Party ====
U.S. President Donald Trump on June 4, 2020, tweeted: "The Radical Left Democrats new theme is 'Defund the Police'. Remember that when you don't want Crime, especially against you and your family. This is where Sleepy Joe is being dragged by the socialists. I am the complete opposite, more money for Law Enforcement! #LAWANDORDER." Both Democrats and Republicans have cited association with the defunding movement as a contributing factor in the Democrats' loss of seats in the 2020 House elections and the poorer-than-expected results in other Democratic campaigns. In House and Senate races, Republican campaigns frequently attacked Democratic opponents by claiming they supported defunding the police.

=== Cities ===
==== New York City ====
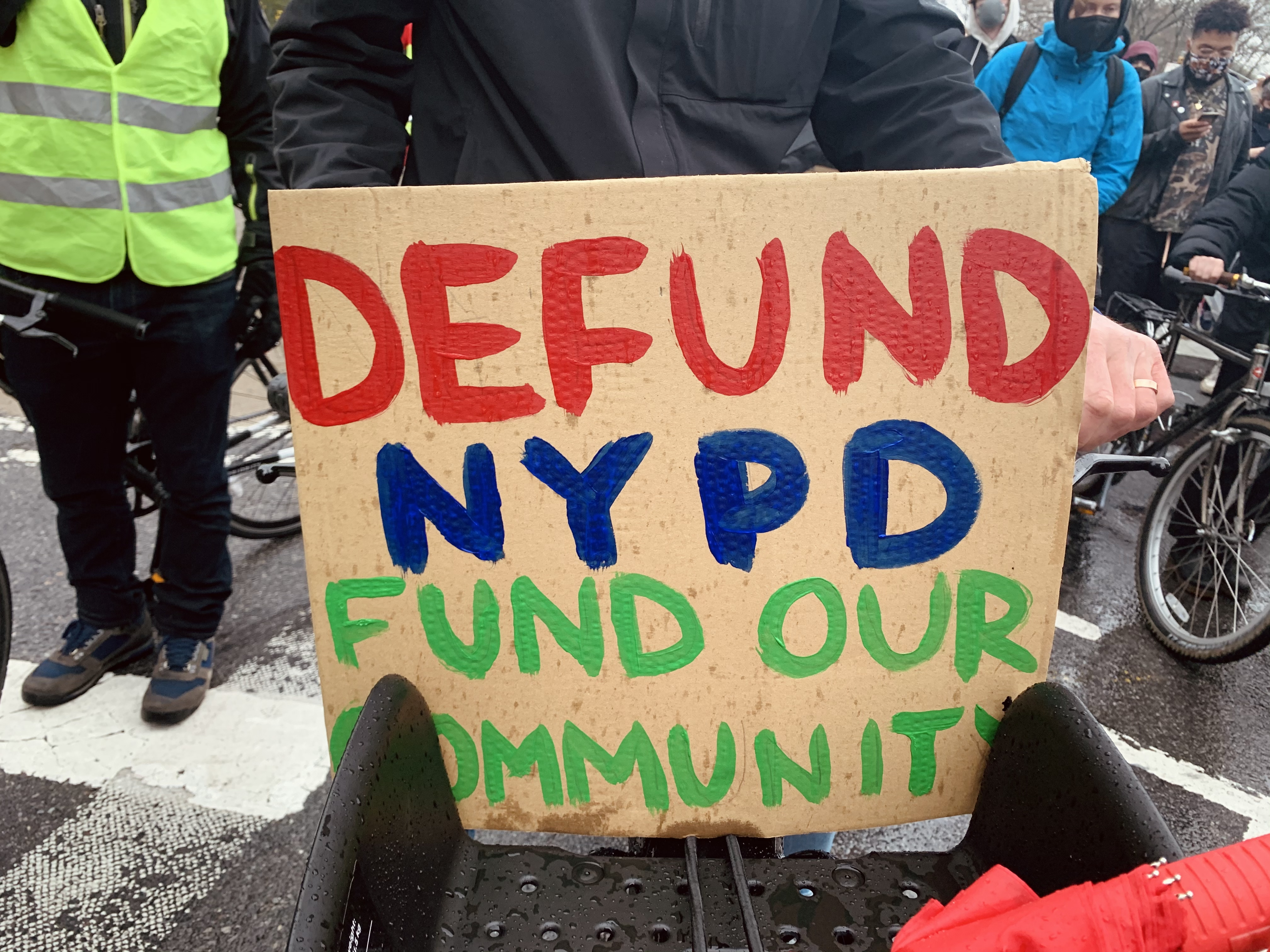
A protester calling to defund the NYPD during the Daunte Wright protests in New York City

In April 2020, activists and lawmakers in New York City urged Mayor Bill de Blasio to address budget shortfalls caused by the COVID-19 pandemic by reducing the police budget. During the George Floyd protests in June 2020, a group of 48 city office candidates, along with Brooklyn College's Policing and Social Justice Project, called on the city council to cut $1 billion from the NYPD budget over four years. City Comptroller Scott Stringer proposed a plan to save $1.1 billion over four years by reducing the number of officers and cutting overtime, reallocating the funds to social workers, counselors, community-based violence interrupters, and other trained professionals.

On June 15, 2020, Police Commissioner Dermot Shea announced that the NYPD would eliminate its plainclothes police units in the precinct-level and Housing Bureau anti-crime teams, and the officers would be reassigned to community policing and detective work. By August 2020, New York City had nominally cut $1 billion from the police budget, though most of the changes involved shifting responsibilities to other city agencies, with minimal impact on the size of the police force. Black and Hispanic members of the city council were divided on major cuts to policing. The winner of the 2021 New York City mayoral election, Eric Adams, promised to increase the city's police force.

==== Los Angeles, San Francisco, and Oakland ====
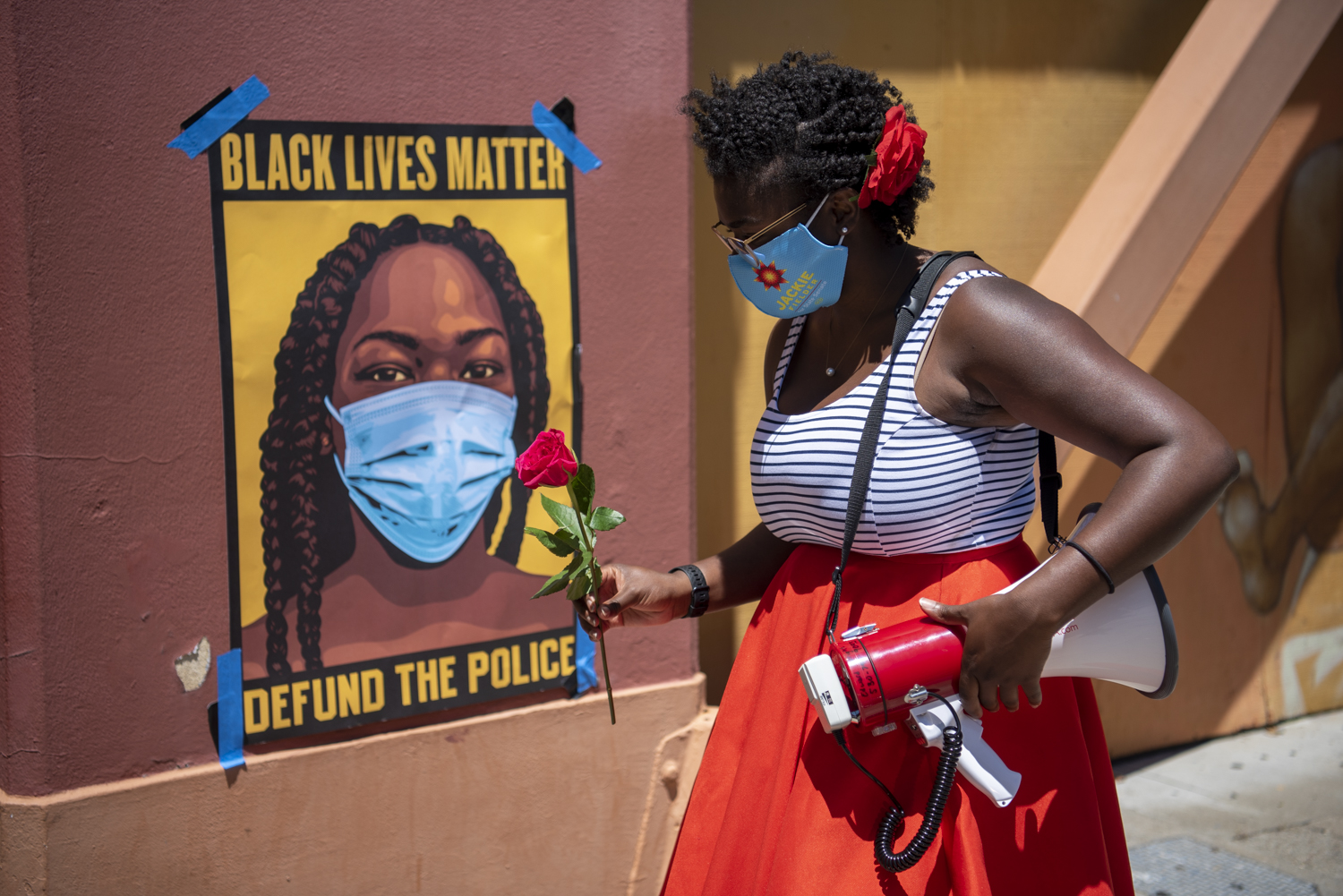
A poster and a protester in San Francisco in 2020

In Los Angeles, Mayor Eric Garcetti has said he would cut as much as $150 million from the Los Angeles Police Department's (LAPD) budget, a reversal of his planned increase of $120 million. Garcetti announced the funds would be redirected to community initiatives.

In San Francisco, Mayor London Breed announced a plan to redirect some police funds to the city's Black community, and she announced that police will no longer respond to non-criminal calls. In December 2021, following reports of increased crime and drug activity in the Tenderloin, Breed announced her intention to deploy additional police to the area to address the emergency.

In 2021, the Oakland City Council, in a controversial decision, voted 7-2 to redirect $17.4 million of the city budget from the Oakland Police Department (resulting in the loss of 50 officers and funding cuts to police academies) to the Department of Violence Prevention to "employ violence interrupters and community ambassadors in flatland neighborhoods".

==== Minneapolis ====
A "defund police" sign and stage before a rally in Minneapolis on June 7, 2020

In Minneapolis, activist groups Reclaim the Block and Black Visions Collective requested for the police budget to be cut by $45 million. Members of the Minneapolis City Council signed a pledge to dismantle the police and create new public safety systems. City council member Lisa Bender explained, "Our commitment is to end policing as we know it and to recreate systems of public safety that actually keep us safe." In September, the pledge was set aside. Pledge signer Andrew Johnson clarified that he had supported the pledge only in spirit, not literally. Lisa Bender, the council president, said that different interpretations of the pledge by different council members had created confusion. The New York Times reported that the pledge "has been rejected by the city's mayor, a plurality of residents in recent public opinion polls, and an increasing number of community groups. Taking its place have been the types of incremental reforms that the city's progressive politicians had denounced."

By the end of 2020, as the city was dealing with a spike in violent crime, Minneapolis officials agreed to a 4.5 percent shift of the city's $179 million annual police budget to violence prevention programs and non-emergency services, despite activists and local lawmakers wanting more. In the 2021 Minneapolis municipal election, voters rejected the Question 2 ballot measure to amend the city's charter to eliminate a required minimum number of police officers based on the city's population and that would have replaced the police department with a department of public safety. By the end of 2021, city officials had restored police funding in Minneapolis to $191 million—the funding level prior the resource diversion following the murder of George Floyd in 2020.

==== Other U.S. cities ====
In 2020, local policymakers in Philadelphia, Baltimore, Washington, D.C., San Francisco and other major US cities have supported some form of defunding or opposing budget increases. But all those cities have reversed their stance of defunding their local police departments after historic crime spikes following 2020. In Nashville on June 2, 2020, a city budget hearing lasted over ten hours to accommodate the large numbers of residents waiting to take their turn to ask the city to defund the police. In Milwaukee, an activist group called African-American Roundtable, formed by 65 organizations, asked the city to divert $75 million from the police budget to public health and housing.

In August 2020, the Austin City Council unanimously voted to cut $150 million, about one third, from the Austin Police Departments budget. About $80 million of the cuts consists of moving several civilian functions from the police department to other parts of city government, and $50 million is for "alternative forms of public safety". The other $20 million is to be reallocated to other city programs including violence prevention, abortion access, and food access. On November 2, 2021, the city of Des Moines, Iowa, elected Indira Sheumaker to the office of City Council representing Ward 1 of the city—comprising the most diverse neighborhoods in the city. She defeated incumbent Bill Gray on a platform of defunding the police, decentralizing city government, and establishing community owned utilities. During her campaign, Indira was fighting felony charges stemming from an altercation with a police officer at the Iowa State Capitol.

=== Police unions ===
The Los Angeles Police Protective League said defunding the police would be the "quickest way to make our neighborhoods more dangerous" and that "at this time ... 'defunding' the LAPD is the most irresponsible thing anyone can propose."

=== Outside the United States ===
In Canada, politicians in major cities have expressed interest in diverting some police funds. In Toronto, city councilors Josh Matlow and Kristyn Wong-Tam have planned to propose a 10% cut to the police budget. Doctors for Defunding the Police have advocated for widespread reforms. In Montreal, Mayor Valérie Plante has said she is in talks about the police budget. A 2025 study of Montreal police "co-response" teams (units pairing police officers with social workers or mental-health professionals) reported that the city expanded such teams in the period following the 2020 George Floyd protests and local calls to "defund the police". The authors of the study argued that the teams were promoted as a reform response to criticism of policing while conventional enforcement practices continued and the city proceeded with increased police budgets. In the year 1969, Montreal was briefly without a police force entirely resulting in wide spread looting, six bank robberies and at least one death from a sniper.

In Scotland, a violence reduction unit run by Police was set up in 2005, which aims to prevent violence with educational and outreach programs. Former British Prime Minister Tony Blair criticized "defund the police" in a 2021 article for the New Statesman, describing it as "voter-repellent" and "the left's most damaging political slogan since 'the dictatorship of the proletariat.'" Blair furthermore claimed that the slogan "leaves the right with an economic message which seems more practical and a powerful cultural message around defending flag, family and fireside traditional values."

In 2021, the leaderships of the British Labour Party and the Conservative Party pledged not to defund any British police forces.

In April 2025, the Sensible Sentencing Trust, a New Zealand advocacy group, launched a digital billboard campaign targeting New Zealand Green Party Members of Parliament (MPs) Chlöe Swarbrick and Tamatha Paul. The advertisements, displayed in the Auckland Central and Wellington Central electorates, featured the slogans "Defund the Police" and "Whoop Woop! Defund Da Police" alongside images of the MPs and Green Party-style branding.

== See also ==
- Abolish ICE
- Criminal justice reform
- Evidence-based policing
- Ferguson effect
- George Floyd protests
- Institutional racism
- Police abolition movement
