= Sarah Grossman =

American activist and environmentalist (1979–2020)

- Born: October 7, 1997; Springboro, Ohio
- Died: May 30, 2020 (aged 22); Sycamore Hospital
- Cause of death: Coronary Artery Dissection due to Ehlers-Danlos Syndrome
- Education: Ohio State University
- Parent(s): Todd and Christi Grossman
- Relatives: Jessa Grossman (sister)

Sarah Grossman (October 7, 1997 – May 30, 2020) was an American activist and environmentalist whose death after attending the 2020 George Floyd protests gained national social media attention.

== Academia ==
Grossman graduated with honors on May 3, 2020, from the Ohio State University with a B.S. in Environment and Natural Resources. She spent two summers in Guatemala researching the harvesting industry. Her academic focuses included promoting positive environmental policies and providing support to migrant workers and indigenous communities.

== Death ==
Two days before her death, Grossman attended a protest against the murder of George Floyd by a police officer. There, she was exposed to tear gas and pepper spray discharged by the police. Before the completion of the autopsy, it was speculated by family members and by social media users that Grossman's death could be attributed to tear gas exposure. However, her autopsy revealed that she died of a spontaneous coronary artery dissection (SCAD) due to previously undiagnosed Ehlers–Danlos syndrome. According to the American Heart Association, it is common for a SCAD event to be preceded by physical or emotional stress.

== Spirit of SUSTAINS Award ==
The Ohio State University's Sustainability Institute created the Spirit of SUSTAINS award in her honor. This award is bestowed to a student who "shows the same spark as Sarah, someone who was constantly inspiring others and pushing for change" within the sustainability learning community at OSU.
