= Patrick Sharkey =

American sociologist and criminologist (born c. 1977)

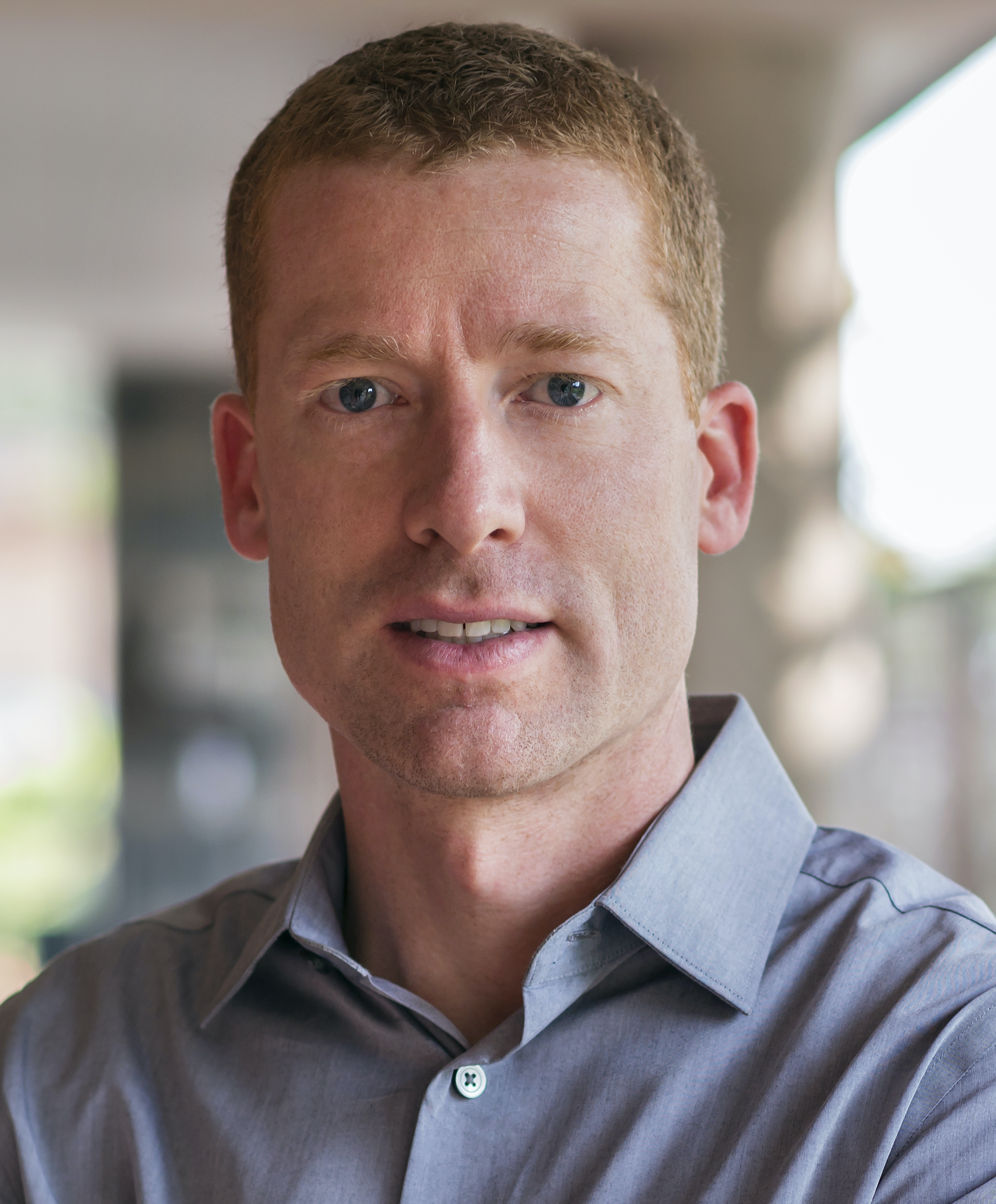
- Sharkey in 2017
- Born: c. 1977 (age 48–49)

Academic background
- Education: Brown University (BA); Harvard University (MA, PhD)
- Academic advisors: Robert J. Sampson; William Julius Wilson; Christopher Winship

Academic work
- Discipline: Sociology, urban sociology, criminology

Patrick Sharkey (born c. 1977) is an American urban sociologist and criminologist. He has been Professor of Sociology and Public Affairs at Princeton University since 2019. He was formerly Professor and Chair of the Department of Sociology at New York University, with an affiliation at NYU's Robert F. Wagner Graduate School of Public Service.

Sharkey's research focuses on crime, policing, and public safety. He leads Americanviolence.org—a project which maps fatal shootings in the United States.

== Education ==
Sharkey earned a Bachelor of Arts in Public Policy and American Institutions at Brown University in 2000. He completed his Ph.D. at Harvard University.

== Work ==
Sharkey studies neighborhood effects, crime, and violence in the United States.

Sharkey is the author of Uneasy Peace: The Great Crime Decline, The Renewal of City Life, and the Next War on Violence, published in 2018 by W.W. Norton. The book focuses on how the decline of violent crime has affected urban life and urban inequality in America. His first book, Stuck in Place: Urban Neighborhoods and the End of Progress Toward Racial Equality, was published in 2013 by the University of Chicago Press.

Sharkey is the Scientific Director for Crime Lab New York City. He was previously the Director for the Institute for Human Development and Social Change at New York University, a Robert Wood Johnson Health and Society Scholars Program Postdoctoral Scholar at Columbia University from 2007 to 2009, and a research assistant at the Urban Institute in Washington D.C. Labor and Social Policy Center from 2000 to 2002.

== Awards ==
Sharkey received the William Julius Wilson Early Career Award given by the Inequality, Poverty and Mobility Section of the American Sociological Association in 2015. In 2010, he received the Roger Gould Prize given by the American Journal of Sociology for the best article published in 2008/2009, and was co-winner of the best article in urban sociology published in 2008/2009 Jane Addams Award given by the ASA Community and Urban Sociology Section.

Sharkey's first book received the Mirra Komarovsky Award for the best book of the year from the Eastern Sociological Society, the Otis Dudley Duncan Award from the Population Section of the American Sociological Association (ASA), and The American Publishers Award for Professional and Scholarly Excellence (PROSE Award) in Sociology and Social Work.
