= Indira Sheumaker =

American politician (born 1994)

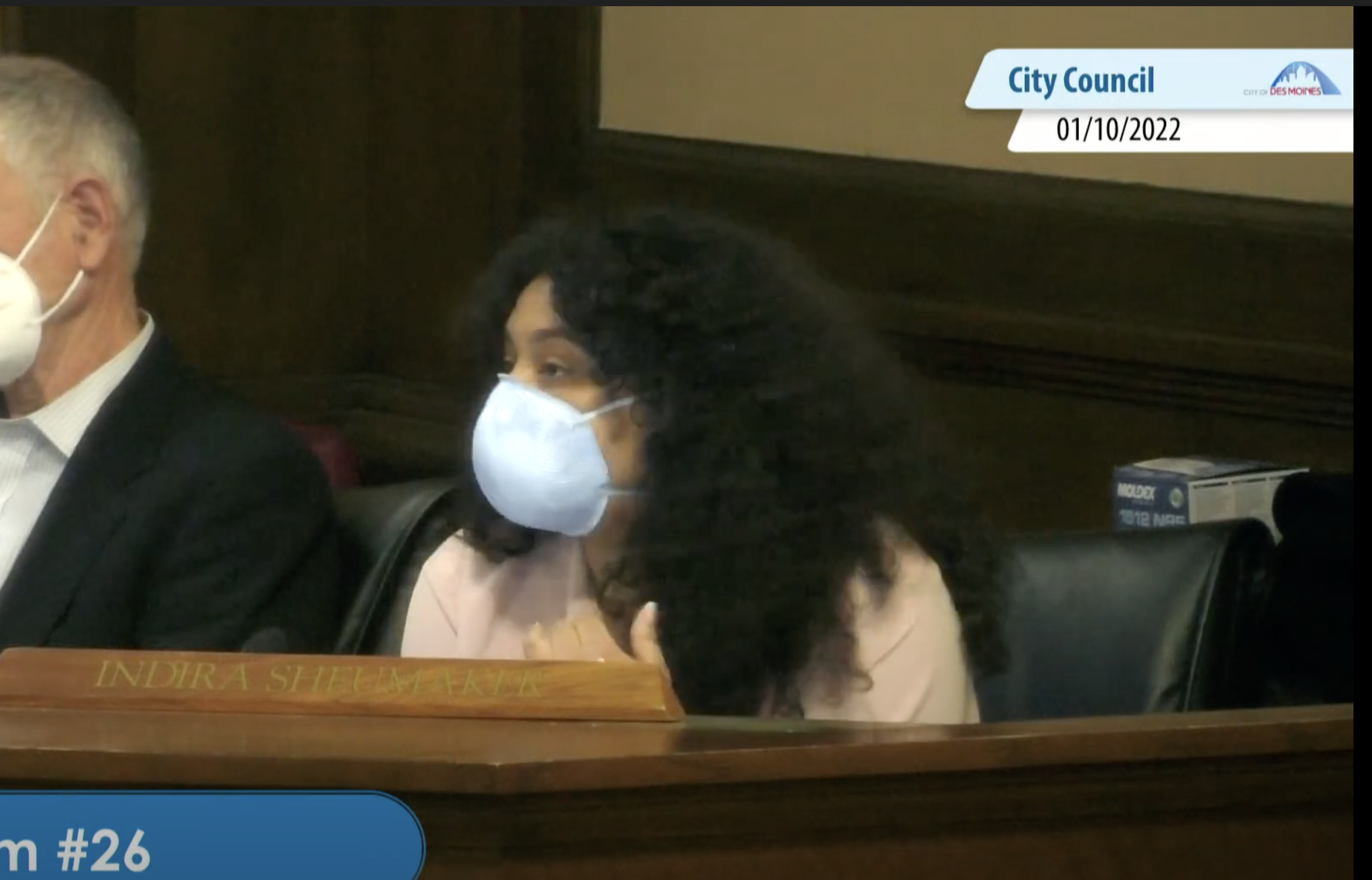
- Des Moines City Council Member Indira Sheumaker addressing the council

Member of the Des Moines City Council from the 1st Ward
- In office January 3, 2022 – August 31, 2023
- Preceded by: Bill Gray
- Succeeded by: Chris Coleman

Personal details
- Born: 28 May 1994 (age 32) Des Moines, Iowa, U.S.
- Education: Iowa State University
- Profession: Politician, activist

Indira Sheumaker is a politician and activist who served as a member of the Des Moines, Iowa City Council for Ward 1 from 2022 to 2023.

== Early life ==
Sheumaker was born in Des Moines to a Black American mother and a white American father. She was named in honor of Indira Gandhi. She graduated from Herbert Hoover High School. She was active in theatre while attending Iowa State University.

In 2020, felony charges were brought against Sheumaker related to her participation in a July 1, 2020, protest against felony disenfranchisement at the Iowa State Capitol. Police alleged that Sheumaker assaulted a police officer and interfered with official acts causing serious injury. She faced an additional serious misdemeanor for allegedly assaulting another police officer, getting on his back and putting him in a chokehold. In May 2021, felony charges were dropped against Sheumaker after she accepted an agreement with the state pleading guilty to aggravated misdemeanor assault of a police officer. All other charges against Sheumaker were dropped.

On June 30, 2022, two Des Moines police officers filed a lawsuit against six protesters, including Sheumaker, alleging assault. Sheumaker countersued in August, accusing officers of putting her in a chokehold and pushing her. Sheumaker's countersuit against the officers was dismissed by a Polk County judge for falling outside the statute of limitations. The officers filed their suit one day before the deadline.

Most of the officers involved in the lawsuit eventually settled or dismissed their claims against Sheumaker. However, Detective Jeff George maintained his case, seeking $250,000 in damages. In August 2024, George was granted a default judgment after Sheumaker stopped responding to court filings. On October 15, 2024, Judge Coleman McAllister awarded George $6,000.

== Career ==
Prior to running for office, Sheumaker was involved as an activist with Des Moines' Black Liberation Movement. It was through her social justice activism and involvement in council meetings at the Des Moines City Council that Sheumaker decided to run for political office. She attended a city council meeting for the first time in 2020 to advocate for an ordinance banning racial profiling.

== Des Moines City Council ==
On 2 November 2021, Sheumaker ousted the two-term incumbent Ward 1 councilman Bill Gray. The race was non-partisan. Sheumaker received 46% of votes, while Gray received 36% of votes. Sheumaker has no previous experience with electoral politics. Her platform included defunding the police, decriminalization of marijuana, food security, affordable housing, the municipalization of city utilities, decentralization of power, and wealth redistribution. She was sworn into office on January 10, 2022.

Sheumaker became the subject of controversy in 2022 when she did not attend any council functions and responded to fewer than 10 out of more than 400 emails sent to her city account between May 23 and June 30. After these absences were reported by multiple local media outlets, Sheumaker released a statement attributing them to COVID-19 and depression. Through the end of 2022, Sheumaker missed a total of 11 council meetings and work sessions, one less than the other six council members combined.

Controversy returned in April 2023. After Sheumaker missed three more council functions between March 27 and April 10, a citizen launched a petition calling for her resignation. Angelo Thorne asserted that Sheumaker was unresponsive when he attempted on multiple occasions to contact the councilwoman. Sheumaker did not respond publicly to the allegation, but on April 24, her father told the Des Moines Register that she had been hospitalized.

Sheumaker missed eleven more council meetings and work sessions in May and June, prompting one neighborhood association to call for her to resign or be removed from office. At the July 17 council meeting, another neighborhood association challenged Sheumaker, who was not present, to "please consider the oath [she] made to the people of Ward 1 and determine if [she] can still execute that oath."

On August 1, five residents of Ward 1 filed a "citizen's complaint of written charges" accusing Sheumaker of "willful and habitual neglect, as well as refusal to perform the duties of office" in violation of Iowa Code 66.1A. The complaint further asked the city council to schedule a hearing to remove her from office per Iowa Code 66.29.

On August 21, Mayor Frank Cownie sent a letter on behalf of the city council to Sheumaker asking her to communicate her intentions regarding the office no later than 5:00 pm on August 28 and explaining that failure to do so would result in the council proceeding upon the assumption that her seat was abandoned. When multiple attempts to deliver the letter by professional process server and certified mail failed, Cownie released the letter to the media and declared that the deadline would stand. It was announced on August 28 that Sheumaker had not responded before the deadline, and the city council would proceed accordingly.

Sheumaker resigned on September 6, 2023, effective August 31.

== See also ==
- Black Lives Matter
- Defund the police
