= Firstar Center =

Firstar Center was the name previously used by two buildings before Firstar Corporation changed its name to U.S. Bancorp. The two buildings are now named:

- U.S. Bank Center, a high-rise in Milwaukee, Wisconsin
- U.S. Bank Arena, an indoor arena in Cincinnati, Ohio
