= EurekaBank =

Past Bank in the San Francisco Bay Area

- Company type: Private
- Industry: Financial services
- Founded: 1988; 38 years ago in Foster City, California
- Defunct: January 1998; 28 years ago
- Fate: Acquired by Bay View Bank.
- Successor: U.S. Bank through Bay View Bank
- Headquarters: Foster City, California
- Parent: America First Eureka Holdings
- Website: archived official website

EurekaBank was a Foster City, California, based bank, with primary operations in the San Francisco Bay Area. Formerly known as Eureka Federal Savings and Loan, based out of San Carlos, California, and known for a scandal in the 1980s involving John DeLorean (maker of the car made famous by the movie Back to the Future). The bank operated 36 branches in the region, and was one of the largest local banks. Its overall existence was short, as it was acquired by Bay View Bank in 1998, less than ten years after it was founded as a replacement to the failed Eureka Federal Savings.
