= Jerry Grundhofer =

Jerry Grundhofer (born 1945) is the former CEO and Chairman of U.S. Bancorp.

== Education ==
He graduated from Seattle University in 1965.

== Career ==
Jerry was a vice president of Security Pacific Bank and Bank of America in the early 1990s. He left Bank of America to join Star Banc Corporation in 1993.

In 1993, he became the CEO of Star Banc Corporation and held that position until 1998, when it merged with Firstar Corporation, where he continued as CEO. He became the CEO of U.S. Bancorp when it merged with Firstar in February 2001, and then chairman of the board in 2002, succeeding his brother John F. Grundhofer. Jerry Grundhofer stepped down as CEO on December 12, 2006, and was replaced by Richard K. Davis who assumed the position of CEO in addition to his role as president. Jerry Grundhofer remained as chairman of the board of directors until the end of 2007, when he was scheduled to retire.

He also served as vice chairman of Bank of America (BAC) and was on the board of Lehman Brothers.

In March 2009, Citigroup announced the appointment of Grundhofer to its board of directors. In July 2009, he was appointed chairman of Citibank NA. He also led the board's risk management and finance committee and was a member of its nomination and governance committee. In June 2011, Grundhofer resigned from the board. Also in June 2011, he was named chairman of Santander Holdings.
