= Richard K. Davis =

American businessman

Personal details
- Born: 1958 (age 67–68) Born in America
- Education: California State University, Fullerton (BA)
- Occupation: Retired as Chief Executive Officer, Make-A-Wish America (January 2, 2019 - November 2022)

Richard K. Davis (born 1958) is an American businessman. Since January 2, 2019 Davis has served as the chief executive officer of Make-A-Wish America, having previously served as Executive Chairman and President of U.S. Bancorp.

== Biography ==
Davis is a native of Southern California and spent his childhood there. As a child, he earned the seed money for college as a professional actor and singer, including a performance in a production of the Wizard of Oz. This led to Davis' passion for the arts and later board work with various arts organizations. Davis began his banking career at 18 as a teller to pay his way through college. He received a bachelor's degree in Economics from California State University, Fullerton in 1983. He completed Banking School Programs at the University of Washington and Cornell University.

Davis rose through the banking ranks to ultimately lead the fifth largest commercial bank in the U.S. Davis served as an Executive Vice President of Bank of America and of Security Pacific. In 1993, he joined Star Banc Corporation as Executive Vice President for Consumer Banking. In 1998, he oversaw the merger of the Star Banc Corporation with the Firstar Corporation, Firstar with the Mercantile Corporation in 1999, and Firstar with U.S. Bancorp in 2001. He served as Chief Operating Officer of U.S. Bancorp from October 2004 to December 2006. He served as President from October 2004 to January 2016, Chief Executive Officer from December 2006 until April 2017, and Chairman of the Board from December 2007 to April 2018.

U.S. Bancorp is a financial services holding company with more than $422 billion in total assets as of December 31, 2015, 67,000 employees and businesses across the United States, Canada, and Europe, serving more than 18.5 million customers. U.S. Bancorp is headquartered in Minneapolis and is the parent company of U.S. Bank, which has 3,164 full-service banking offices and 5,020 ATMs in 25 states. U.S. Bancorp is also the parent company of Elavon, a provider of merchant processing services. Davis chairs U.S. Bancorp's management committee, composed of the 14 highest-ranking executives within the organization.

== Leadership positions ==
In 2015, Davis served on the boards of the Twin Cities YMCA, Minneapolis Art Institute, University of Minnesota Foundation, Greater MSP, National American Red Cross, University of San Diego, Minnesota Business Partnership, The Clearing House, Itasca Group, Twin Cities United Way, Dow Chemical and the Financial Services Roundtable, of which he previously served as chairman. He also serves as the lead director of Xcel Energy Inc. and serves as Executive Chairman of U.S. Bancorp.

== Honors ==
Davis has been honored by the Banking and Finance Division of the UJA-Federation of New York and has been the recipient of the President's Lifetime Volunteer Service Award. In 2010, American Banker selected Davis as the Banker of the Year, and he was chosen "2010 Executive of the Year" by the Twin Cities Business Journal. In 2011, he received the Hendrickson's Award for Ethical Leadership. He was instrumental in starting Step Up, a Twin Cities program that has given more than 18,000 distinguished teenagers their first "professional" summer jobs.

Under Davis' leadership, U.S. Bank earned the 2011 Spirit of America Award, the highest honor bestowed upon a company by United Way. U.S. Bancorp was awarded the 2013 Freedom Award, the highest recognition given by the U.S. Department of Defense to employers for their support of employees who serve in the National Guard and Reserve. In 2015, U.S. Bank was recognized by the Ethisphere Institute as one of the World's Most Ethical Companies.

== Involvement in Minnesota Orchestra lockout ==
Davis' tenure on the Board of the Minnesota Orchestra has been marked by controversy, mainly due to his involvement in the 2012-2013 musician lockout. In October 2012, Davis said to the Star Tribune of the Minnesota Orchestra musicians, "There's a risk that they find their way to another place, and those who can leave will. It's going to be a personal decision where they want to perform." The handling of the lockout has been a controversial topic in the Twin Cities and in the music world. In April 2013, celebrated music director Osmo Vänskä wrote an open letter to the Minnesota Orchestra Board of Directors, signaling his intent to resign by September if the lockout was not settled.

When the Minnesota Orchestra balanced its budget in 2010, Davis said, "This was a season characterized by disciplined budget management and significant expense cuts, which kept our operations stable in an unpredictable environment." However, when contract talks with musicians began in 2012, Davis walked back that statement, writing, "In Minnesota, we were able to deliver balanced budgets through large, unsustainable endowment fund draws and 'bridge-the-gap' fundraising." A state auditor report later found that, when petitioning for $14 million in state money to renovate Orchestra Hall, Minnesota Orchestra CEO Michael Henson "did not indicate to legislators that he and some association board members were beginning to have significant concerns about the association’s financial condition."
