= 901 Marquette =

Skyscraper in Minnesota

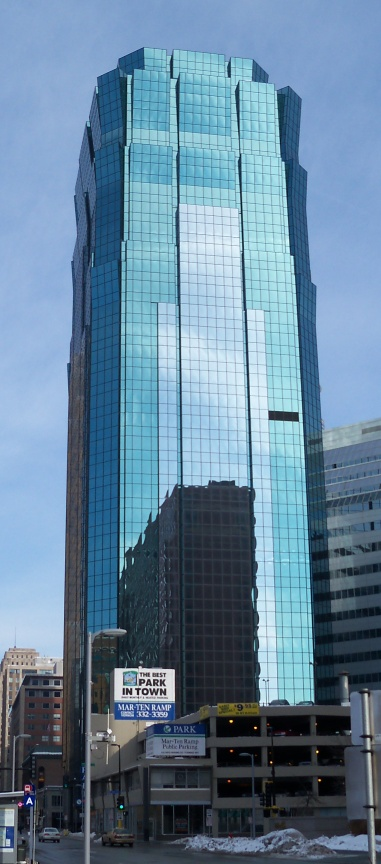
- Interactive map of the 901 Marquette area

General information
- Type: Office
- Architectural style: Modern
- Location: Minneapolis, Minnesota, 901 Marquette Ave
- Coordinates: 44°58′26.2″N 93°16′21.1″W
- Construction started: 1989
- Completed: 1991

Height
- Height: 464 ft (141 m)

Technical details
- Floor count: 34
- Floor area: 758,587 sq ft (70,475.0 m^{2})

Design and construction
- Architects: Walsh Bishop Associates, Inc.
- Main contractor: Ryan Companies US, Inc.

901 Marquette, formerly known as AT&T Tower, is a 464-foot (141 m) tall skyscraper in Minneapolis, located on the corner of Marquette Avenue and 9th Street South. It was completed in 1991 and has 34 floors. It houses offices of AT&T, Nuveen Investments, Field Nation, Fallon Worldwide, Syncada, the Norwegian Honorary Consulate General, DeWitt Mackall Crounse & Moore, Brown & Brown, Inc and other tenants. FICO had its headquarters in the building from 2004 until 2013. It is the 14th-tallest building in the city. A skyway connects the building to both 121 South Eighth and International Centre. The Foshay Tower is across the street to the north. The main floor lobby is shared with the Oracle Centre. The first and second floors contain restaurants and numerous small shops. On April 4, 2023, it was announced that AT&T would be moving out of the building and relinquishing its naming rights.

== See also ==
- List of tallest buildings in Minneapolis
