= United Postal Savings Association =

Historic savings and loan association

- Type: Savings and loan association
- Industry: Financial services
- Founded: 1907, Missouri
- Defunct: February 1, 1994
- Fate: Acquired
- Successor: Mercantile Bancorporation
- Headquarters: St. Louis, Missouri, United States
- Area served: Missouri
- Products: Banking services

The United Postal Savings Association was an American savings and loan association that operated in the St. Louis, Missouri, metropolitan area until its merger with Mercantile Bancorporation on February 1, 1994.

== Foundation and early years ==
The association was founded in 1907 as a Missouri-chartered mutual savings and loan association. It initially operated as Bohemian American Home Building & Loan Association (Slovan) before becoming Slovan Savings & Loan Association. Initially uninsured, the association operated alongside a real estate office.

In 1956, with assets of $1.3 million dollars it applied for and was approved by the Federal Savings and Loan Insurance Corporation (FSLIC) for insurance accounts and moved into separate headquarters in South St. Louis, Missouri where it spent much of its early operating history serving the neighborhood. It expanded by opening its second location in Kirkwood, Missouri, a suburb of St. Louis, in 1966, and adopted the name United Savings and Loan Association.

Following its merger with Postal Plaza Savings & Loan Association in 1971, the association adopted the name United Postal Savings Association.

== Operating history and growth ==
In the mid-1960s, the association participated, with other regional financial institutions, in developing computerized banking transactions to serve customers from multiple locations. In December 1965, it converted its mortgage loan records "on-line," allowing customers to go to any location of a participating financial institution to transact business and have their account records updated immediately at all the other offices of that institution.

Led by brothers President Robert F. Gorman and Executive Vice President Michael J. Gorman, United Postal launched several new products and services in the 1980s, including:

- Negotiable order of withdrawal account or NOW Accounts, after the federal government passed the Depository Institutions Deregulation and Monetary Control Act (DIDMCA) in 1980
- Totally Free Checking Accounts
- Ready Reserve Cash Accounts that functioned similar to a money market fund. These accounts were not federally insured but were secured by federal agency securities held by the Association
- Annuities issued by insurance companies and sold by licensed new account personnel
- Home loans, solicited from real estate agents, brokers, and home builders by a trained street sales force. Through this initiative, United Postal Savings became the largest originator of conventional home loans in the St. Louis metropolitan area
- Home equity, credit card and automobile loans

The association also expanded by adding other locations over the years, some of which were added as a result of mergers. Key acquisitions include:

- 1971: Operating under the name United Savings and Loan Association, it merged with Postal Plaza Savings & Loan Association and retained their one office. This merger resulted in changing the Association's name to United Postal Savings Association
- 1980: Merged with Tower Grove Savings & Loan Association and added another office, which was later closed and consolidated into its existing office network
- 1981: Acquired Lafayette Federal Savings and Loan Association through a supervisory assisted merger that added Lafayette's network of offices
- 1987: Merged with Metropolitan Savings & Loan Association of Kansas City, Missouri and acquired five offices in that market that were later sold or closed resulting in departure from Kansas City

== Acquisition of Lafayette, Impact on goodwill, and decision to go public ==
In 1980 the Federal Home Loan Bank publicly solicited bids for the acquisition of Lafayette Federal Savings & Loan Association (Lafayette), a St. Louis-based institution that was losing money and had exhausted its capital below levels to remain in compliance with regulators. United Postal was selected as the winning bidder and the bid required a substantial amount of assistance from the FSLIC. Negotiations between the Association and the FSLIC continued over many months until, effective November 1, 1981, the assisted merger was approved by the Federal Home Loan Bank Board. Generally accepted accounting rules required all assets and liabilities of Lafayette to be marked to market as of the merger date, resulting in creation of a goodwill asset of over $100 million on United Postal’s balance sheet.

The association remained in capital compliance and generated profits in each of the following years until, in 1989, with the Financial Institutions Reform, Recovery and Enforcement Act of 1989 (FIRREA), capital requirements for federally regulated financial institutions were changed. As a result, a significant portion of the Association’s goodwill was charged against earnings. In 1991, the association's board of directors concluded, and the Securities and Exchange Division of the United States concurred, that the remaining portions of goodwill were permanently impaired and had to be written off against earnings, reducing capital.

In response to the capital reduction, the association's directors voted in favor of converting from a mutual savings & loan association to a public company. United Postal Savings and Loan formed a holding company named United Postal Bancorp, Inc. and, in March 1992, became a stockholder owned company whose stock traded on the NASDAQ under the ticker "UPBI". The stock sale restored needed capital to levels in excess of regulatory capital requirements.

On the association 's stock conversion date, March 20, 1992, the stock traded up from its $10.00 offer price to close the day at $15.50, over a 50% increase in value.

== Acquisition by Mercantile ==
On August 17, 1993, Mercantile Bancorporation N A offered to acquire United Postal Savings for $30.00 per share. United Postal's stockholders who held their stock to the buyout offer from Mercantile on August 17, 1993 made 500% on their original investment over the seventeen months from the conversion date, as the original cost basis of $10.00 had reduced to $5.00 due to a stock split by United Postal.

The company was publicly traded until the acquisition effective date of February 1, 1994. Throughout its time as a public company up until it was acquired, the Association operated with excess capital and profitable earnings under the continued leadership of Robert F. Gorman as Chairman of the Board and Michael J. Gorman as Chief Executive Officer. The Association was the second largest savings and loan association in Missouri and the sixth largest depository headquartered in the St. Louis metropolitan area at the time of the merger; it operated twenty-two offices and was staffed with over 600 employees. For the fiscal year ending December 31, 1993, the year of the merger with Mercantile, the Association held $1.256 billion in Total Assets, $1.036 billion in Total Deposits, and $81.421 million in Total Equity.

Mercantile subsequently merged into Firstar Bancorp in September 1999 and Firstar later merged with US Bank, which is its current name. US Bank is currently the sixth largest bank in assets in the United States.
