= Mercantile Bancorporation =

American bank in Missouri

- Trade name: Mercantile Bank
- Type: Public
- Traded as: NYSE: MTL (1970–1999)
- Industry: Banking
- Founded: 1899; 127 years ago in St. Louis, Missouri as Mercantile Trust Company
- Defunct: September 20, 1999; 27 years ago
- Fate: Acquired by Firstar Corporation
- Successor: Firstar Corporation
- Headquarters: St. Louis, Missouri
- Area served: Missouri, Illinois, Kansas, Iowa, Arkansas, Kentucky
- Key people: Thomas H. Jacobsen

Mercantile Bancorporation was the largest bank holding company in Missouri when it was acquired by Firstar Corporation in 1999.

The Mercantile Bank of St. Louis was founded in St. Louis, Missouri, in 1850.

In 1996, its chief executive Thomas H. Jacobsen began a series of acquisitions, increasing its assets from $15.9 billion to $35.8 billion. One of the biggest acquisitions was that of Mark Twain Bancshares in 1996.

At the time of its acquisition by Firstar, Mercantile was a $36 billion multi-bank holding company headquartered in St. Louis operating 500 locations in Missouri, Iowa, Kansas, Illinois, Arkansas and Kentucky.

== History ==
In December 1964, the Mercantile Trust Company converted from a state‐chartered trust company into a national bank and was renamed Mercantile Trust Company National Association.

Mercantile Trust Company formed a holding company in 1970 called Mercantile Bancorporation to allow it to acquire other banks and to expand beyond St. Louis.

Upon the retirement of Donald E. Lasater in 1989, Thomas H. Jacobsen, a vice chairman of Florida-based Barnett Banks, replaced Lasater as president, chief executive, and chairman of Mercantile Bancorporation.

=== Expansion in Missouri ===
In November 1991, Mercantile announced the pending acquisition of the St. Joseph-based Ameribanc with its American Bank subsidiaries for $87 million in stock. The acquisition was completed in April 1992.

In August 1993, Mercantile announced the pending acquisition of the St. Louis-based United Postal Bancorp with its United Postal Savings Association subsidiary for $192 million in stock. The acquisition was completed in January 1994.

In September 1994, Mercantile announced the pending acquisition of the Kansas City-based Central Mortgage Bancshares Inc. for $97 million in stock.

In January 1995, Mercantile announced the pending acquisition of the Springfield-based Southwest Bancshares Inc. for $23 million in stock.

In February 1995, Mercantile announced the pending acquisition of the Sikeston-based AmeriFirst Bancorporation with its AmeriFirst Bank subsidiary for $23.6 million in stock.

In October 1996, Mercantile announced the pending acquisition of the St. Louis-based Mark Twain Bancshares Inc. with its Mark Twain Bank subsidiary for $855 million in stock. At the time of the announcement, Mercantile had 440 branches in Missouri, Illinois, Iowa and Arkansas while Mark Twain had 39 branches in St. Louis and Kansas City areas. The acquisition was completed in April 1997.

In December 1996, Mercantile announced the pending acquisition of the Chesterfield-based Roosevelt Financial Group Inc. with its Roosevelt Bank subsidiary for $1.07 billion in stock and cash. At the time of the announcement, Mercantile had more than 500 branches in Missouri, Illinois, Iowa and Arkansas while Roosevelt had 83 locations in Missouri, Kansas and Illinois. To allow the merger to proceed, the Federal Reserve Board ordered Mercantile to divest banks in five markets. Due to overlapping branches, Mercantile said it was planning to close 50 branch offices. The acquisition was completed in July 1997. Roosevelt branches were rebranded as Mercantile on November 17, 1997.

=== Expansion in Illinois ===
In its first expansion move outside of Missouri, Mercantile announced in August 1986 the pending acquisition of the Alton-based First Bancshares Corp. of Illinois for an undisclosed in stock. The acquisition was completed in February 1987.

In August 1991, Mercantile announced the pending acquisition of the Centralia-based Old National Bancshares with its 2 banks for $22 million in stock and cash. The acquisition was completed in December 1991.

In July 1995, Mercantile announced the pending acquisition of the Sterling-based First Sterling Bancorp with its First National Bank of Sterling-Rock Falls subsidiary for $24 million. The acquisition was completed in January 1996.

In March 1996, Mercantile announced the pending acquisition of the Freeport-based Today's Bancorp with its two banks and 12 offices for $87.2 million in cash and stock.

In August 1996, Mercantile announced the pending acquisition of the Alton-based Regional Bancshares Inc. with its Bank of Alton subsidiary for $41 million.

In October 1997, Mercantile announced the pending acquisition of the Rockford-based HomeCorp Inc. with its 10-office HomeBanc subsidiary for $45 million in stock. The acquisition was completed in March 1997 for $51 million.

In February 1998, Mercantile announced the pending acquisition of the Springfield-based Firstbank of Illinois Company for $697 million in stock. At the time of the announcement, Firstbank had 48 offices in Illinois and Missouri. The acquisition was completed in July 1998.

In August 1998, Mercantile announced the pending acquisition of the Rock Island-based Financial Service Corporation of the Midwest with its Rock Island Bank subsidiary for $118 million in stock. The acquisition was completed in August 1998.

=== Expansion in Kansas ===
In July 1992, Mercantile announced the pending acquisition of the family-owned Johnson County-based MidAmerican Corp. and Johnson County Bankshares Inc. for $129 million in stock. The acquisition was completed in January 1993.

In December 1995, Mercantile announced the pending acquisition of the Topeka-based Peoples State Bank for $94 million. The acquisition was completed in August 1996.

=== Expansion in Iowa ===
In July 1993, Mercantile announced the pending acquisition of the Waterloo-based Metro Bancorporation with its subsidiary Waterloo Savings Bank for $55 million in stock. The acquisition was completed in January 1994.

In December 1994, Mercantile announced plans to acquire the Davenport-based Plains Spirit Financial Corporation with its First Federal Savings Bank of Iowa subsidiary for an undisclosed amount.

In August 1995, Mercantile announced plans to acquire the Des Moines-based Hawkeye Bancorp with its 65 bank offices for $351 million in stock. In May 1998, Mercantile announced plans to acquire the Iowa City-based First Financial Bancorporation and its First National Bank Iowa subsidiary for $169 million in stock. The acquisition was completed in September 1998.

=== Expansion in Arkansas ===
In December 1994, Mercantile announced plans to acquire the North Little Rock-based TC Bankshares Inc. for $155.7 million in stock.

In July 1997, Mercantile announced plans to acquire the Arkadelphia-based Horizon Bancorp for an unknown amount in stock. The acquisition was completed in February 1998.

=== Expansion in Kentucky ===
In January 1998, Mercantile announced plans to acquire the Paducah-based CBT Corporation, the holding company for four banks, for $285 million in stock. The acquisition was completed in July 1998.

=== Acquisition by Firstar ===
Just five months after Star Banc Corporation completed the acquisition of Firstar Corporation to form the new Firstar in November 1998, the newly combined Firstar announced in May 1999 the pending acquisition of Mercantile Bancorporation for $10.6 billion in stock. The acquisition was completed in September 1999. After the merger, Jerry Grundhofer remained as president and chief executive officer of Firstar. Thomas H. Jacobsen, Mercantile's chief executive, became chairman of Firstar.
