= Oliver Clyde Fuller =

American banker, financier, & golfer (1860-1942)

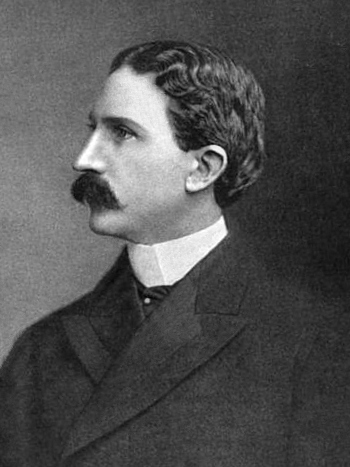
Oliver Clyde Fuller

Oliver Clyde Fuller (September 13, 1860 – August 17, 1942) was an American banker, financier, and golfer.

== Life ==
Born September 13, 1860 on a plantation in Clarkesville, Habersham County, Georgia to Henry Alexander Fuller and Martha Caroline Fuller (née Wyly). He was a descendant of American Revolutionary War generals, Tennessee Governor John Sevier, and French royalty.

He matriculated into the University of Georgia at the age of 16. He was boxing champion during his Junior year. He graduated from the University of Georgia.

Following the Civil War, with the Fuller family farm destroyed, and slaves freed, the Fuller family moved immediately to Atlanta. His father, Henry Alexander Fuller, opened what would become the largest Grocery Store in Atlanta during reconstruction. H.A. Fuller, with his sons Oliver, and Clarence Paul Fuller became Grocer Merchants. This store originated as Fuller & Oglesby. This partnership was dissolved, and became Fuller & Sons. In 1881, he married Katherine Fitzhugh Caswell of Milwaukee, Wisconsin, and they had six children. Fuller and Caswell took over management of her father's estate, Napoleon Bonaparte (N.B.) Caswell in Milwaukee, Wisconsin, for which the Caswell block is named. In 1891, he moved to Milwaukee, Wisconsin. In 1893, founded the O. C. Fuller Co., an investment firm. In 1903 he founded and became President of the Wisconsin Trust Co., which took over the Fuller Co. He was a leader in the creation of the First Wisconsin Group, a bank and trust firm, serving as president of the First Wisconsin National Bank, the First Wisconsin Trust Co., and the First Wisconsin Co., which later became Firstar Corporation, which in turn became U.S. Bancorp in 2001. Fuller was also Treasurer and Trustee of Forest Home Cemetery, which was run by St. Paul's Episcopal Church.

Active in many businesses and athletic clubs, Fuller was a Trustee of the Northwestern Mutual Life Insurance Co., and a Director of the Wisconsin Telephone Co., Allis-Chalmers Manufacturing Co., Milwaukee Gas Light Co., Wisconsin Securities Co., Wisconsin Public Service Co., Milwaukee Mechanics Insurance Co., Milwaukee Refrigerator Transit Co., and the Milwaukee Auditorium Co. He was a member of council of American Bankers' Association, 1908–10; elected to Chairman of executive committee of the Trust Company Section, American Bankers' Association, 1908; Vice President, 1909; and President, 1910. He was also involved in the Wisconsin Society Sons of American Revolution (formerly President); Wisconsin Society of Colonial Wars, Phi Delta Theta Society of the University of Georgia. He retired from business life in 1926.

== Personal life ==
Fuller was an avid golfer, credited with helping bring the game to the Midwest. He was a founder and President of various Milwaukee golf, tennis, yacht and athletic clubs. An article in The American Golfer in 1915 called him a pioneer golfer in the Cream City.

He died on August 17, 1942.
