= Star Bank LPGA Classic =

Golf tournament formerly on the LPGA Tour

The Star Bank LPGA Classic was a golf tournament on the LPGA Tour from 1994 to 2001. It was played at the Country Club of the North in Beavercreek, Ohio. During most of its existence, it was sponsored by either Star Banc Corporation or its corporate successor Firstar Corporation.

== Winners ==
LPGA Champions Classic

- 2001 Wendy Doolan

Firstar LPGA Classic

- 2000 Annika Sörenstam
- 1999 Rosie Jones

Star Bank LPGA Classic

- 1998 Meg Mallon
- 1997 Colleen Walker
- 1996 Laura Davies
- 1995 Christa Johnson

Children's Medical Center LPGA Classic

- 1994 Maggie Will
