= First Bank System =

American regional bank holding company

- Final logo by Chermayeff & Geismar from 1979 to 1997.
- Trade name: First Bank
- Formerly: First Bank Stock Corporation (1929–1968)
- Type: public
- Traded as: NYSE: FBS (1968–1997)
- Industry: Banking
- Founded: 1864 in Minneapolis, Minnesota, as First National Bank of Minneapolis
- Defunct: August 1, 1997; 29 years ago
- Fate: Changed name to U.S. Bancorp after acquiring U.S. Bancorp of Oregon
- Successor: U.S. Bancorp
- Headquarters: Minneapolis, Minnesota
- Area served: Minnesota, Montana, North Dakota, South Dakota, Wisconsin, Colorado, Illinois, Nebraska, Iowa, Kansas, and Wyoming
- Key people: John Grundhofer

First Bank System was an American regional bank holding company that operated from 1864 to 1997. It was headquartered in Minneapolis, Minnesota, United States. What was once First Bank forms the core of today's U.S. Bancorp; First Bank merged with the old U.S. Bancorp in 1997 and took the U.S. Bancorp name.

== History ==
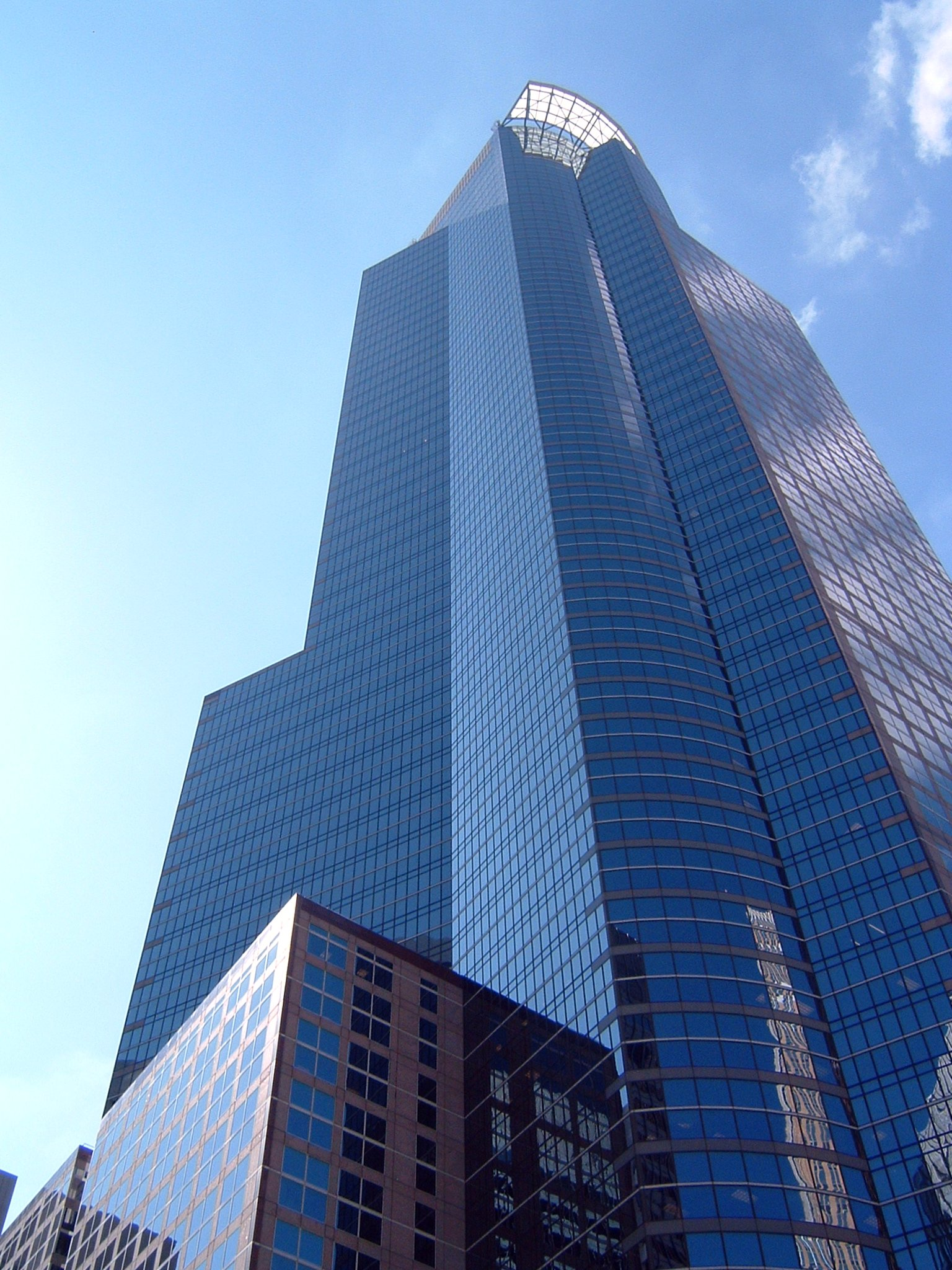
The former First Bank Place

First Bank's earliest direct corporate ancestor, First National Bank of Minneapolis, was founded in 1864 and received its charter in 1865. That bank, in turn, grew out of private banking house Sidel, Wolford and Co.

On August 23, 1929, First National Bank of Minneapolis merged with First National Bank of Saint Paul (founded in 1864 out of private banking house Parker, Paine and Co.) to form the First Bank Stock Corporation. The two banks jointly acquired the stock in 32 other banks in Minnesota, North and South Dakota and Montana.

In February 1956, First Bank Stock Corporation announced the pending acquisition of six banks in Minnesota and one bank in La Crosse, Wisconsin. This transaction is significant for the holding company since it marks its first entry into the state of Wisconsin and would also mark its last acquisition outside of Minnesota due to the passage of the Bank Holding Company Act of 1956 a few months later which would forbid new interstate acquisitions until provisions of this act were gradually weakened during the mid-1980s and later removed the following decade.

In April 1968, the First Bank Stock Corporation changed its name to First Bank System Inc.

In 1992, the company moved into its new 53-story headquarters building called First Bank Place. At the time of its completion, the building was one of the tallest buildings in Minneapolis.

=== Expansion in Minnesota ===
In May 1989, First Bank System announced the pending acquisition of the Anoka-based Northern Cities Bancorp. Inc. with its Northern Bank of Anoka and Northern National Bank of Forest Lake subsidiaries for an undisclosed amount.

In January 1992, First Bank System announced the pending acquisition of Carl Pohlad's Minneapolis-based Bank Shares Inc. with its Marquette Bank Minneapolis and Marquette Bank Rochester subsidiary for $230 million in stock. After hearing that Federal and state regulators had plan to block the acquisition on the grounds that the acquisition as planned would result in capturing a too large of the percentage of the banking market in the Rochester area, the acquisition was modified in October to exclude the purchase of the Rochester bank so that the new deal was only for the 22-office Marquette Bank Minneapolis for $200 million in stock. The acquisition was completed in December 1992. Three First Bank and seven Marquette Minneapolis offices were closed as a result of the acquisition.

In April 1993, First Bank System announced the pending acquisition of the Mankato-based American Bancshares and its American Bank subsidiary for an undisclosed amount. The acquisition was completed in March 1994.

In July 1994, First Bank System announced the pending acquisition of the Minneapolis-based Metropolitan Financial Corporation with its Metropolitan Federal Savings Bank subsidiary for approximately $877 million in stock. At the time of the announcement, Metropolitan Financial had 211 offices in Minnesota, Nebraska, Iowa, Kansas, Wisconsin, Wyoming and the Dakotas while First Bank had 215 offices in Minnesota, Colorado, Illinois, Montana, Wisconsin and the Dakotas. The acquisition was completed in January 1995 for $800 million in stock. This acquisition gave First Bank System first time entry into the states of Nebraska, Iowa, Kansas and Wyoming. First Bank sold off 63 Metropolitan Financial locations in eight states to 28 different banks since First Bank believed that those locations had lacked the potential for growth.

=== Expansion in North Dakota ===
In December 1991, First Bank System announced the pending acquisition of the Fargo-based Siouxland Bank Holding Co. with its Dakota Bank and Trust of Fargo and First National Bank of Hettinger subsidiaries for an undisclosed amount. The acquisition was completed in July 1992. As required by North Dakota state regulators, First Bank sold First National Bank of Hettinger to Rolla-based Rolla Holding Co. in the following year.

In December 1993, First Bank System announced the pending acquisition of the Bismarck-based United Bank of Bismarck in North Dakota for an undisclosed amount. The acquisition was completed in September 1994.

=== Expansion in South Dakota ===
In October 1994, First Bank System announced the pending acquisition of the Sioux Falls-based First Western Corporation with its Western Bank subsidiary for an undisclosed amount. The acquisition was completed in March 1995.

=== Expansion in Wisconsin ===
First Bank System first entered the state of Wisconsin by announcing in February 1956 the pending acquisition of the La Crosse-based Batavian National Bank, later renamed National Bank of Wisconsin.

In July 1977, First Bank System announced that its Wisconsin subsidiary had purchased the ailing Midland National Bank of Milwaukee for $13 million in a transaction facilitated by the Comptroller of Currency. After the acquisition, La Crosse-based National Bank of Wisconsin was renamed First Bank, La Crosse, and Midland National Bank became a branch of the La Crosse bank and was then renamed First Bank-Midland Milwaukee Division. Since First Bank System had entered Milwaukee through a loophole in the Bank Holding Company Act of 1956, the three largest Milwaukee-based banks immediately tried to get the federal courts to reverse the Comptroller's ruling, but were unsuccessful.

=== Temporary expansion in Washington ===
In September 1986, First Bank System announced the acquisition of the failed Omak-based Mid Valley Bank of Omak for an undisclosed amount from Washington state regulators in a Federal Deposit Insurance Corporation facilitated transaction. The acquired bank was renamed First Bank Washington.

Seven years later, First Bank System announced the pending sale of the four-office First Bank Washington to a group of local investors for $4 million. The sale was completed in May 1994.

=== Expansion in Colorado ===
First Bank System first entered the state of Colorado by announcing in June 1988 the pending acquisition of the Denver-based Central Bancorporation with its 19 Central Bank subsidiaries for $135 million for AmeriTrust's 88% interest in the company and $17.5 million to acquire the remaining 12% from the minority investors. To allow First Bank to make a bid on Central, First Bank had to agree with the state of Colorado to help bail out 9,000 industrial bank depositors in 14 failed Colorado industrial banks by paying those depositors $8 million. The acquisition was completed in December 1988.

In July 1991, First Bank System announced the acquisition of deposits and 18 branch offices of the failed Aurora-based Capitol Federal Savings from the Resolution Trust Corporation for $12.5 million. Two of the acquired offices were closed and the remaining 16 offices became branch offices of Central Bank.

In May 1992, First Bank System announced the pending acquisition of the Denver-based Western Capital Investment Corporation with its 35-location Bank Western for $150 million in stock. The acquisition was completed in December 1992.

In November 1992, First Bank System announced the pending acquisition of the Denver-based Colorado National Bankshares with its Colorado National Bank subsidiary for $500 million in stock. The acquisition was completed in May 1993.

In June 1993, First Bank System merged all of its Colorado interests into Colorado National Bank. Ten redundant branch offices were closed at this time.

=== Expansion in Illinois ===
First Bank System first entered the state of Illinois by announcing in September 1993 the pending acquisition of the troubled Chicago-based Boulevard Bancorp with its Boulevard Bank in the Wrigley Building, National Security Bank of Chicago, First National Bank of Des Plaines and Citizens National Bank of Downers Grove subsidiaries for $200 million in stock. The acquisition was completed in March 1994. The four separate subsidiary banks were combined to form the statewide 10-office First Bank Illinois.

=== Expansion in Nebraska ===
First Bank System first entered Nebraska through the January 1995 acquisition of the Minnesota-based Metropolitan Financial.

In June 1995, First Bank System announced the pending acquisitions of Southwest Bank of Omaha and also First Bank of Omaha in two separate transaction for disclosed amounts. Both acquisitions was completed in November 1995.

In August 1995, First Bank System announced the pending acquisition of the Omaha-based Firstier Financial Inc. for $700 million in stock. The acquisition was completed in February 1996 for $908 million in stock. After completing the acquisition, merged all of the offices in Nebraska that were formerly offices of Metropolitan Federal Savings, Southwest Bank and First Bank of Omaha to form First Bank Nebraska. 28 offices were closed while 65 were retained.

=== U.S. Bancorp ===
In March 1997, First Bank System announced its pending acquisition of Portland, Oregon-based U.S. Bancorp for $9 billion in stock. At the time of the announcement, U.S. Bancorp of Oregon had banking offices in Oregon, Washington, California, Idaho and Utah while First Bank System had banking offices in Minnesota, Colorado, Nebraska, North Dakota, South Dakota, Montana, Iowa, Illinois, Wisconsin, Kansas, and Wyoming. Under the terms of the acquisition, First Bank System would be the nominal survivor, and the merged company would be based at First Bank's headquarters in Minneapolis. However, the merged bank took the more recognizable U. S. Bancorp name. John F. Grundhofer, chairman and chief executive of First Bank, was appointed president and chief executive of the new company while Gerry B. Cameron, chairman and chief executive of U.S. Bancorp of Oregon, was appointed chairman of the new company, which he held until his retirement in 1998. The acquisition was completed in August 1997. Approximately 4000 jobs were eliminated, mostly in Portland.
