= Talech =

American cloud-based software company

talech Point of Sale
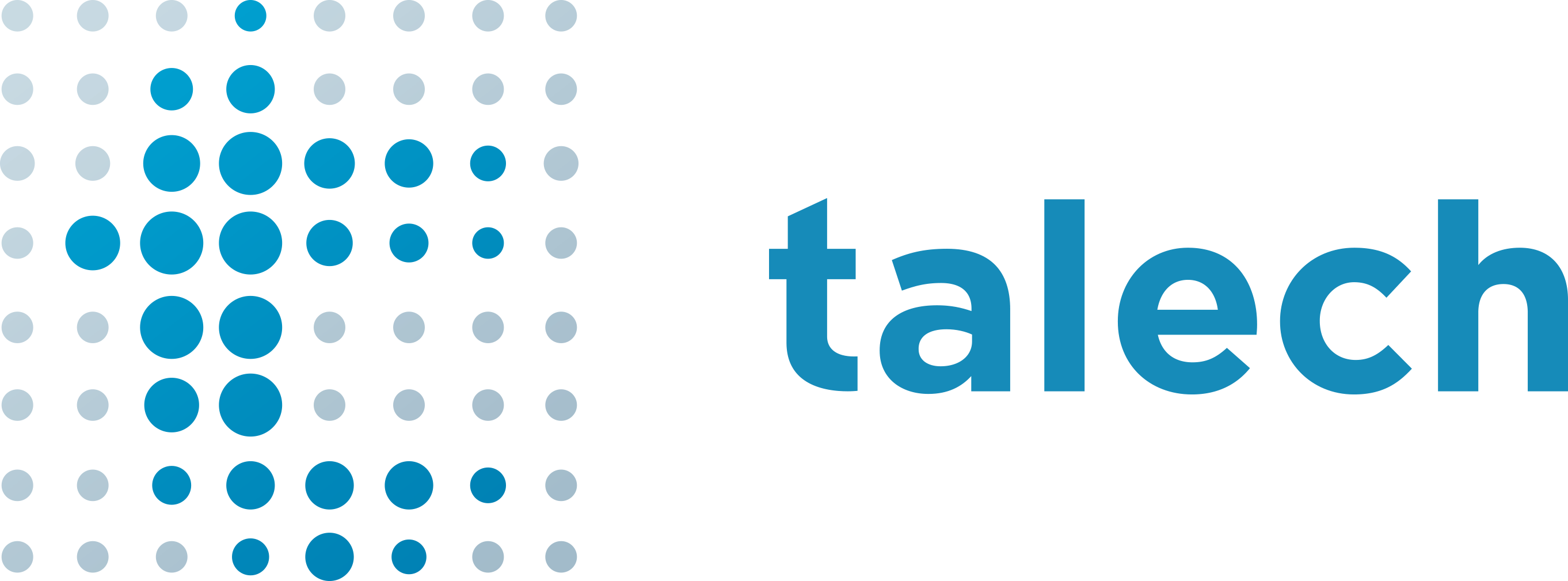
- talech point of sale logo
- Type: Subsidiary
- Industry: Point of Sale
- Founded: 2012; 14 years ago
- Parent: US Bancorp
- Website: www.talech.com

talech is an American cloud-based software company that makes software for point of sale systems in restaurants, retailers and professional services. The software runs on the iOS and Android operating systems and functions on iPads and a variety of Android hardware devices.

talech was established in 2012 by Irv Henderson and Leo Jiang. In September 2019, talech was acquired by US Bancorp.

== History ==
talech was founded in 2012 by Irv Henderson and Leo Jiang who had worked together previously at Yahoo. The company grew steadily, focusing initially on the North American market where they acquired customers through referral partnerships with Chase, Bank of America Merchant Services, Elavon and USA E-pay. In 2014, the company opened an office in Dublin to serve the European market where they operate referral partnerships with Bank of Ireland Payment Acceptance, AIB Merchant Services and Elavon Europe.

In September 2019, the company was acquired by US Bancorp.

== Products and hardware ==
talech provides software that allows businesses to manage multiple operational tasks – such as order management, inventory and staff reporting, customer management, business insights and payments processing – in a single, integrated point-of-sale system.
