= Gunjan Kedia =

Chief Executive Officer of US Bancorp

- Born: January 1971 (age 55); Delhi, India
- Education: Delhi Technological University; Carnegie Mellon University
- Occupation: Banker
- Title: Chief Executive Officer of US Bancorp
- Spouse: Sridhar Tayur
- Children: 2

Gunjan Kedia (born January 1971) is an Indian American banker. She is the current chief executive officer (CEO) of U.S. Bancorp, the fifth-largest bank in the United States. Her appointment as CEO made her one of the few female CEOs in the American financial sector.

== Early life and education ==
Kedia was born in Delhi, India in January 1971. She obtained a bachelor's degree in engineering from the Delhi Technological University. She then completed an MBA at the Tepper School of Business at Carnegie Mellon University. Kedia earned both degrees with distinction.

== Career ==
=== Early career ===
Kedia began working for PricewaterhouseCoopers (PwC). She became a senior associate and held a core leadership position in its financial services division. She then moved to McKinsey & Co., where she also became a partner. Kedia then transitioned to banking leadership with roles at Bank of New York Mellon and State Street before joining U.S. Bank.

=== Banking career ===
By 2004, Kedia transferred to Bank of New York Mellon and worked as executive vice president and head of the company's global product management division. She also served as the executive vice president and head of the investment servicing business in the Americas at Boston’s State Street Corporation.

Kedia started working for U.S. Bancorp in 2016, and led the revenue lines. In 2024, she was promoted as president and vice-chair of the bank's wealth, corporate, commercial, and institutional banking. She was appointed CEO in April 2025, succeeding Andrew Cecere. In an interview, Kedia maintained that deals would form an important part of the bank's strategy under her leadership.

=== Board memberships ===
Kedia serves on the boards of PBS, Business Advisors for Carnegie Mellon Business School, Junior Achievement USA, and CorStone. For her work, she earned several recognitions, such as her inclusion to the 2025 American Banker's Most Powerful Women in Banking and Finance list, and Barron's 100 Most Influential Women in U.S. Finance.

In January 2026, U.S. Bancorp announced that Kedia would become chair of the company’s board of directors in April 2026, succeeding executive chairman Andy Cecere, who will retire from the board at that time.

== Personal life ==
Kedia is married to Sridhar Tayur, a social entrepreneur and investor. They have 2 sons. He founded startups, including SmartOps and OrganJet, before working in the academia. He joined Carnegie Mellon University's Tepper School of Business as a professor.
