= Syncada =

SaaS company

Syncada from Visa
- Company type: Subsidiary
- Industry: Financial services
- Founded: 2009
- Defunct: 2013
- Fate: Amalgamated into US Bank Corporate Payments Group
- Successor: US Bankcorp
- Headquarters: AT&T Tower, Minneapolis, MN, United States
- Key people: Kurt Schneiber (CEO); Bill Henneman (CFO)
- Products: Payment systems Freight payments Freight audit
- Number of employees: 590 (2013)
- Parent: U.S. Bancorp
- Website: www.syncada.com

Syncada was an American global financial supply chain network that offered business-to-business payments in the cloud under the software as a service (SaaS) model.

It was a joint venture between Visa and U.S. Bancorp, Syncada launched in July 2009. U.S. Bank was Syncada's first bank customer. Commerce Bank was the second to join the network in 2010. In March 2011, Citibank became the third bank to use the network.

US Bank has bought back the shares of Syncada from Visa and Syncada was functionalized within US Bank Corporate Payments Group.

== History ==
Syncada's creation stems from PowerTrack, an online platform for invoice processing, payment and trade financing, launched by U.S. Bancorp in 1997. In 2009, U.S. Bancorp divested PowerTrack

In January 2010, Syncada named Kurt Schneiber chief executive officer. He joined from Fortent, an anti-money-laundering software provider, where he was president. He received recognition as one of Treasury & Risk's most-influential people in finance for 2011. In September 2011, it named Kay LaBare chief information officer.
