= Star Banc Corporation =

Former American Banking Corporation

- Trade name: Star Bank
- Formerly: First National Cincinnati Corporation (1974–1988)
- Type: public
- Traded as: NYSE: STB (1988–1998)
- Industry: Banking
- Founded: 1863; 163 years ago as the First National Bank of Cincinnati in Cincinnati, Ohio
- Defunct: November 20, 1998; 27 years ago
- Fate: Acquired Firstar Corporation and assumed the Firstar name
- Successor: Firstar Corporation (now U.S. Bancorp)
- Headquarters: Cincinnati, Ohio
- Area served: Ohio, Indiana, Kentucky, and Tennessee
- Key people: Jerry Grundhofer
- Website: archived official website

Star Banc Corporation was a Cincinnati, Ohio-based regional bank holding company that acquired Firstar Corporation in 1998 and took the Firstar name; the merged bank acquired U.S. Bancorp in 2001 and took the U.S. Bancorp name. The company can trace its origins back to 1863 when it was first founded as the First National Bank of Cincinnati.

== History ==
In Cincinnati, First National Bank of Cincinnati opened for business in 1863 under National Charter #24, the charter that U.S. Bancorp still operates under today.

In January 1974, to allow the company to expand outside of Cincinnati and to allow it to acquire other banks, the First National Bank of Cincinnati reorganized as a holding company, First National Cincinnati Corporation.

In July 1988, First National Cincinnati changed the names of all of its 17 subsidiary banks to Star Bank. In Columbus, Ohio State Bank was renamed Star Bank Central Ohio. The First National Bank of Cincinnati was renamed Star Bank, N.A., Cincinnati.

To be more consistent with the names of its subsidiary banks, the holding company changed its name to Star Banc Corporation the following year in April 1989.

=== Expansion in Ohio ===
First National Cincinnati Corporation made its first expansion move outside of Hamilton County by announcing in May 1975 the pending acquisition of the Yellow Springs, Ohio-based Miami Deposit Bank from Midwestern Fidelity Corporation for an undisclosed amount. At the time of the announcement, First National Bank of Cincinnati had 24 offices. The acquisition was completed in October 1975 for $3.6 million.

In May 1976, First National Cincinnati Corporation announced the pending acquisition of the Ironton-based First National Bank of Ironton and Troy-based First National Bank & Trust Co. for an undisclosed amount. The acquisition was completed in August 1976.

In July 1977, First National Cincinnati Corporation announced the pending acquisition of the Circleville-based Third National Bank of Circleville for an undisclosed amount. The acquisition was completed in December 1977 for $2.9 million in cash.

In December 1978, First National Cincinnati Corporation announced the pending acquisition of the Gallipolis-based Commercial & Savings Bank for an undisclosed amount. The acquisition was completed in August 1979.

In October 1979, First National Cincinnati Corporation announced the pending acquisition of the Portsmouth-based Portsmouth Banking Company for an undisclosed amount. The acquisition was completed in August 1980.

In April 1981, First National Cincinnati Corporation announced the pending acquisition of the Hamilton-based Second National Bank of Hamilton for an undisclosed amount. The acquisition was completed in March 1982 for $22.2 million in cash and notes.

In July 1982, First National Cincinnati Corporation announced the pending acquisition of the Hillsboro-based Farmers and Traders National Bank for an undisclosed amount. The acquisition was completed in March 1983 for $6.8 million in cash and notes.

In December 1982, First National Cincinnati Corporation announced the pending acquisition of the Fairborn-based Bank One of Fairborn from Banc One Corporation for an undisclosed amount.

In March 1984, First National Cincinnati Corporation announced the pending acquisition of the Eaton-based Preble County National Bank for an undisclosed amount. The acquisition was completed in February 1985.

In December 1984, First National Cincinnati Corporation announced the pending acquisition of the Columbus-based Ohio State Bank from BancOhio Corporation for an undisclosed amount. The acquisition was completed in July 1985. BancOhio Corporation had to divest its offices in Columbus before it would be allowed to proceed with its merger with National City Corp.

In June 1985, First National Cincinnati Corporation announced the pending acquisition of 10 offices of the failed Home State Savings Bank offices in Cincinnati, Middletown and Dayton from Hunter Savings Association for an undisclosed amount.

In August 1987, First National Cincinnati Corporation announced the pending acquisition of the Sidney-based First Sidney Banc Corporation with its First National Bank of Sidney subsidiary for an undisclosed amount. The acquisition was completed in January 1988.

In December 1987, First National Cincinnati Corporation announced the pending acquisition of the Miamisburg-based First National Bancorp with its First National Bank of Miamisburg subsidiary for an undisclosed amount. The acquisition was completed in July 1988.

In March 1992, Star Banc Corporation announced the pending acquisition of 28 branch offices in Greater Cleveland from Ameritrust Corporation for $22 million that Society National Bank was required to divest. The acquisition was completed in June 1992. Society Corporation was required by Federal regulators to divest those offices before it could complete its acquisition of Ameritrust.

In September 1994, Star Banc Corporation announced the acquisition of 47 branch offices and $1.12 billion in deposits of the failed TransOhio Federal Savings Bank from the Resolution Trust Corporation for $122.4 million.

In November 1996, Star Banc Corporation announced the pending acquisition of seven AmeriFirst branch offices in Ohio from the Bowling Green-based Mid Am, Inc., for an undisclosed amount. The acquisition was completed in February 1997.

In February 1998, Star Banc Corporation announced the pending acquisition of 53 banking offices in Ohio for an undisclosed amount that Banc One Corporation was divesting as a cost-cutting measure prior to its merger with First Chicago NBD to form the new Bank One Corporation. The acquisition was completed in June 1998 for only 49 offices since federal regulators had objected to the purchase of four of the proposed offices.

=== Expansion in Kentucky ===
First National Cincinnati Corporation made its first expansion move outside the state of Ohio by announcing in November 1985 the pending acquisition of the Newport-based New Bancshares Inc. with its Newport National Bank subsidiary for an undisclosed amount. The acquisition was completed in March 1986.

In September 1987, First National Cincinnati Corporation announced the pending acquisition of the Covington-based Peoples Liberty Bancorporation for an undisclosed amount. The acquisition was completed in February 1988.

In November 1989, Star Banc Corporation announced the pending acquisition of the Verona-based Verona Bank for an undisclosed amount. The acquisition was completed in May 1990.

In January 1991, Star Banc Corporation announced the pending acquisition of the Covington-based Kentucky Bancorporation with its six bank and 17 offices for an undisclosed amount. The acquisition was completed in September 1991.

In September 1997, Star Banc Corporation announced the pending acquisition of the Louisville-based Great Financial Corporation for $655 million in stock. At the time of the announcement, Great Financial had 45 branch offices in Kentucky and Indiana. The acquisition was completed in February 1998.

In April 1998, Star Banc Corporation announced the pending acquisition of the Bowling Green-based Trans Financial Inc. for $696 million in stock. At the time of the announcement, Trans Financial had 56 branch locations in Kentucky and Tennessee while Star Banc had 328 locations in Ohio, Kentucky and Indiana. The acquisition was completed in August 1998. The result of this acquisition gave Star Banc's first entry into the state of Tennessee.

=== Expansion in Indiana ===
First National Cincinnati Corporation first entered the state of Indiana by announcing in January 1986 the pending acquisition of the Lawrenceville-based Peoples National Bancorp of America with its Peoples National Bank of Lawrenceburg subsidiary for an undisclosed amount. The acquisition was completed in June 1986 for $6.5 million.

In February 1986, First National Cincinnati Corporation announced the pending acquisition of the Richmond-based Second National Corporation with its Second National Bank of Richmond subsidiary for an undisclosed amount. The acquisition was completed in June 1986 for $44.9 million in stock.

In August 1987, First National Cincinnati Corporation announced the pending acquisition of the Aurora-based Aurora First National Bancorp with its First National Bank of Aurora subsidiary for an undisclosed amount. The acquisition was completed in January 1988.

=== Firstar ===
In July 1998, Star Banc Corporation announced the pending acquisition of the Milwaukee, Wisconsin-based Firstar Corporation for $7.3 billion in stock. At the time of the announcement, Firstar had banking offices in Wisconsin, Illinois, Minnesota, Arizona, Iowa, Ohio, and Missouri while Star Banc had banking offices in Ohio, Indiana, Kentucky, and Tennessee. Under the merger agreement, former Firstar board members would have 14 out of 32 directors seats on the board of the new corporation and could help control the direction of the new combined company. Star Banc was the nominal survivor, and the merged bank retained Star Banc's charter and stock price history. However, the merged bank would be based in Milwaukee under the Firstar name and inherited old Firstar's ticker symbol, FRS. It was also announced that Star Chairman and Chief Executive Jerry Grundhofer would become president and chief executive of the merged Firstar, while Firstar Chairman and Chief Executive Roger Fitzsimonds remained chairman of the merged company. The merger was completed in November 1998. At the time of the merger, the new company had 720 full-service banking offices in Ohio, Wisconsin, Kentucky, Illinois, Indiana, Iowa, Minnesota, Tennessee and Arizona.

Only two years later, Firstar acquired Minneapolis-based U.S. Bancorp—itself the product of a 1997 merger between First Bank System of Minneapolis and the original U.S. Bancorp of Portland, Oregon. The merged bank took the U.S. Bancorp name and moved to Minneapolis. However, U.S. Bancorp retains Star Banc's pre-1998 stock price history, and operates under Star Banc's charter. It also claims Star Banc's founding in 1863 as its founding date.

== Sponsorships ==
Beginning in 1995, Star Banc Corporation started to sponsor the annual Star Bank LPGA Classic golf tournament that was held at the Country Club of the North in Beavercreek, Ohio. Corporate sponsorship continued after Star Banc acquired Firstar and changed the name of the bank to Firstar in late 1998; the golf tournament continued under the new Firstar name in 1999. Corporate sponsorship was dropped in 2001 after Firstar acquired U.S. Bancorp that same year.

In April 1997, Star Bank became the official bank of the Cincinnati Reds. The Reds replaced this sponsorship in August 2000 with a new business relationship with Provident Bank (through successive mergers, Provident became a part of National City and later PNC with each successor continuing the sponsorship).

== See also ==
- Star Bank LPGA Classic
- Fourth & Walnut Center
