= Maggie Will =

American professional golfer (born 1964)

Personal information
- Full name: Margaret Will
- Nationality: United States
- Born: November 22, 1964 (age 61) Whiteville, North Carolina, U.S.
- Height: 5 ft 4 in (1.63 m)

Career
- Sport: Golf
- College: Furman University
- Turned professional: 1987
- Former tours: LPGA Tour; Futures Tour
- Professional wins: 3

Number of wins by tour
- LPGA Tour: 3

Best results in LPGA major championships
- Chevron Championship: T13: 1999
- Women's PGA C'ship: T10: 2001
- U.S. Women's Open: T14: 1996
- du Maurier Classic: T6: 1999
- Women's British Open: CUT: 2001

Margaret "Maggie" Will (born November 22, 1964) is an American professional golfer who played on the LPGA Tour.

== Career ==
Will won three times on the LPGA Tour between 1990 and 1994.

== Professional wins ==
=== LPGA Tour wins (3) ===
No.	Date	Tournament	Winning score	Margin of victory	Runners-up
1	Mar 11, 1990	Desert Inn LPGA International	−2 (73-66-75=214)	1 stroke	(Japan) Ayako Okamoto (United States) Patti Rizzo (United States) Val Skinner
2	Apr 26, 1992	Sara Lee Classic	−9 (71-69-67=207)	Playoff	(United States) Amy Benz (United States) Brandie Burton
3	Aug 14, 1994	Children's Medical Center LPGA Classic	−6 (70-70-70=210)	Playoff	(United States) Jill Briles-Hinton (Peru) Alicia Dibos

LPGA Tour playoff record (2–0)

No.	Year	Tournament	Opponents	Result
1	1992	Sara Lee Classic	(United States) Amy Benz (United States) Brandie Burton	Won with par on first extra hole
2	1994	Children's Medical Center LPGA Classic	(United States) Jill Briles-Hinton (Peru) Alicia Dibos	Won with birdie on second extra hole
