= Roger L. Fitzsimonds =

Roger Fitzsimonds was the chairman and CEO of Firstar Corporation (now US Bancorp) from 1986 to 1999. He joined the then First Wisconsin National Bank of Milwaukee in 1964 as a management trainee and managerial and administrative positions in branches in Milwaukee and Green Bay afterwards. He became the vice president of the company in 1973, and president and chief operating officer in 1986. He assumed the same responsibilities for the holding company, Firstar Corporation, in 1987. He retired in 1999. During his term, Firstar Corporation undergone rapid expansion, growing from a regional bank into a large bank with nationwide operations.

Fitzsimonds was also the chairman of the board of the Metropolitan Milwaukee Association of Commerce. He has an honorary Doctorate in Commercial Science from his alma mater, the University of Wisconsin–Milwaukee, and served as president of the university's Lubar School of Business's Advisory Council from 1991-1999.

He obtained his B.A. in Business and MBA in Finance from the University of Wisconsin–Milwaukee in 1960 and 1971 respectively.
