= Bay View Bank =

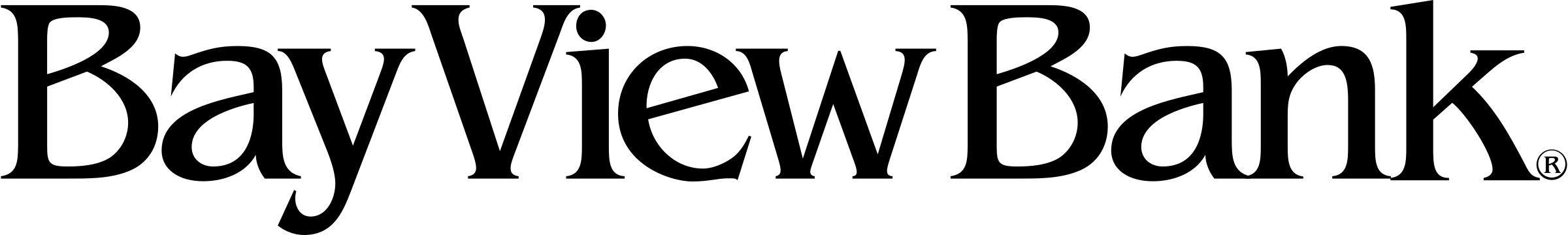
- Company type: Subsidiary
- Industry: Financial services
- Founded: 1973; 53 years ago
- Defunct: November 1, 2002; 23 years ago
- Fate: Liquidation: Bay View Bank's parent company, Bay View Capital Corp., voluntarily liquidated both itself and its namesake bank. Retail banking operations acquired by U.S. Bank.
- Successor: U.S. Bank
- Headquarters: San Mateo, California
- Total assets: US$ 3.87 billion (09/2002)
- Number of employees: 707 (09/2002)
- Parent: Bay View Capital Corporation
- Website: Archived official website

Bay View Bank was a San Mateo, California, based bank which, at its height, operated 58 branches across the San Francisco Bay Area. It was one of the largest locally based banks in the San Francisco market. It had $3.03 billion in combined total deposits and $731,000 in loans, as of September 30, 2002.

A wholly owned subsidiary of Bay View Capital Corp., Bay View Bank was liquidated in 2002 and sold off in parts. U.S. Bank bought its retail branch network and home mortgage assets, and Washington Mutual bought its multifamily and commercial real estate assets.

== History ==
Bay View Capital Corporation was traded on the New York Stock Exchange under the ticker symbol BVC. Its stock suffer greatly at the end of the Twentieth Century. After the value of its stock had dropped 50% during, Bay View Capital decided in May 2000 than it was time sell some or all of its business before the value of the company drops further. Eventually, the owners of the corporation would vote for dissolution and gradual liquidation in the effort to protect equity values.

Bay View Bank suffered a $234.5 million loss in bad loans in the three months during 2000 alone.

In November 2000, Wells Fargo and Golden State Bancorp had expressed initial in purchasing Bay View Bank. However, Bay View Capital rejected their bids of approximately $325 million for being far too low.

In July 2002, Bay View Capital announced that it was in the process of selling the offices, deposits, and only some loans of Bay View Bank to U.S. Bancorp for approximately $429 million while the mortgages were being sold to Washington Mutual at a "slight premium to book value". Both sales were completed by November 2002.
