= Field Nation =

American freelance management company

- Company type: Private Company
- Available in: English
- Founded: 2008
- Headquarters: Minneapolis, MN, {{{location_country}}}
- Key people: Mynul Khan CEO
- Industry: Internet; Freelance Management System; Field Service Marketplace
- Employees: 200 (2019)
- Website: www.fieldnation.com
- Commercial: Yes
- Registration: Required
- Current status: Active

Field Nation is an online matching service for IT contractors and other freelancers.

== History ==
The platform was launched in March 2008 by Mynul Khan. Within 2 years Field Nation broke even and by 2014 posted more than $60 million in revenue.

Field Nation acquired Field Solutions in May 2015.

In September 2015, Field Nation raised $30 million in venture capital, led by Susquehanna Growth Equity, a subsidiary of Susquehanna International Group.

== Software ==
Field Nation matches contract IT and other freelancers with corporate clients through an online marketplace that features 100,000 service providers. Businesses use Field Nation's software to manage independent contractors, existing employees, or both.

The Field Nation mobile app provides real-time work order tracking, ability to negotiate counteroffers, access to payment history, signature capture, and uploading of documents.

== Recognition ==
Field Nation was ranked for two consecutive years in the Inc. 500, a list of the fastest growing companies in America. It was ranked 43rd in the United States in 2013 and 445th in 2014. The company was also ranked 4th fastest growing company in Minnesota in 2014.

Field Nation was recognized by the Minneapolis/St. Paul Business Journal as one of 2013's Fast 50 companies and was ranked Minnesota's 2nd fastest growing private company.

CEO Mynul Khan was named 1 of 10 Minnesota business leaders to watch in 2015 by the Star Tribune.

Field Nation received the 2015 Tekne award for IT services awarded by the Minnesota High Tech Association (MHTA).

The company was named to Star Tribune's 2017 list of top places to work.

== Controversy ==
The platform has faced controversies related to labor law violations and issues relating to unlicensed contracting. The core issue involves both the classification of workers and the compliance of Field Nation’s practices with labor laws. Critics contend that Field Nation might misclassify workers as independent contractors instead of employees, potentially leading to the denial of benefits and protections. Additionally, concerns are raised about unlicensed contractors working through the platform, which could further complicate legal compliance and the quality of work.

A notable legal case highlighting these concerns is Johnson v. Field Nation. In this case, workers in California alleged that Field Nation's practices violated labor laws by improperly classifying them as independent contractors. The case examined whether these workers should be considered employees with associated rights and protections under labor laws.

The outcome of this class action case was that the court ruled in favor of the plaintiffs, finding that Field Nation had indeed misclassified workers as independent contractors. This decision highlighted that these workers were, in fact, employees entitled to the rights and protections under labor laws. The ruling underscored the need for clearer standards and fair treatment of gig economy workers. This case set a precedent for how similar platforms might need to adjust their practices to comply with labor laws.
