= Firstar Corporation =

American financial services company

- Trade name: Firstar Bank
- Formerly: Wisconsin Bankshares Corporation (1929–1960); First Wisconsin Bankshares Corporation (1960–1974); First Wisconsin Corporation (1974–1988)
- Type: public
- Traded as: NYSE: FRS (1988–2001)
- Industry: Banking
- Founded: 1853; 173 years ago in Milwaukee, Wisconsin as Farmer's and Millers Bank
- Defunct: February 27, 2001; 25 years ago
- Fate: Changed name to U.S. Bancorp after acquiring U.S. Bancorp
- Successor: U.S. Bancorp
- Headquarters: Milwaukee, Wisconsin
- Area served: Wisconsin, Illinois, Minnesota, Arizona, Iowa, Ohio, Indiana, Kentucky, Tennessee, Missouri, Illinois, Kansas, Arkansas
- Key people: Roger Fitzsimonds; Jerry Grundhofer
- Website: archived official website

Firstar Corporation was a Milwaukee, Wisconsin-based regional bank holding company that existed from 1853 to 2001. In 2001, Firstar acquired U.S. Bancorp and assumed its name, moving its headquarters to Minneapolis.

== History ==
Firstar was founded in 1853 in Milwaukee, Wisconsin, as Farmer's and Millers Bank. It became First Wisconsin National Bank in 1919 as a result of internal evolution as well as mergers.

=== First Wisconsin Corporation ===
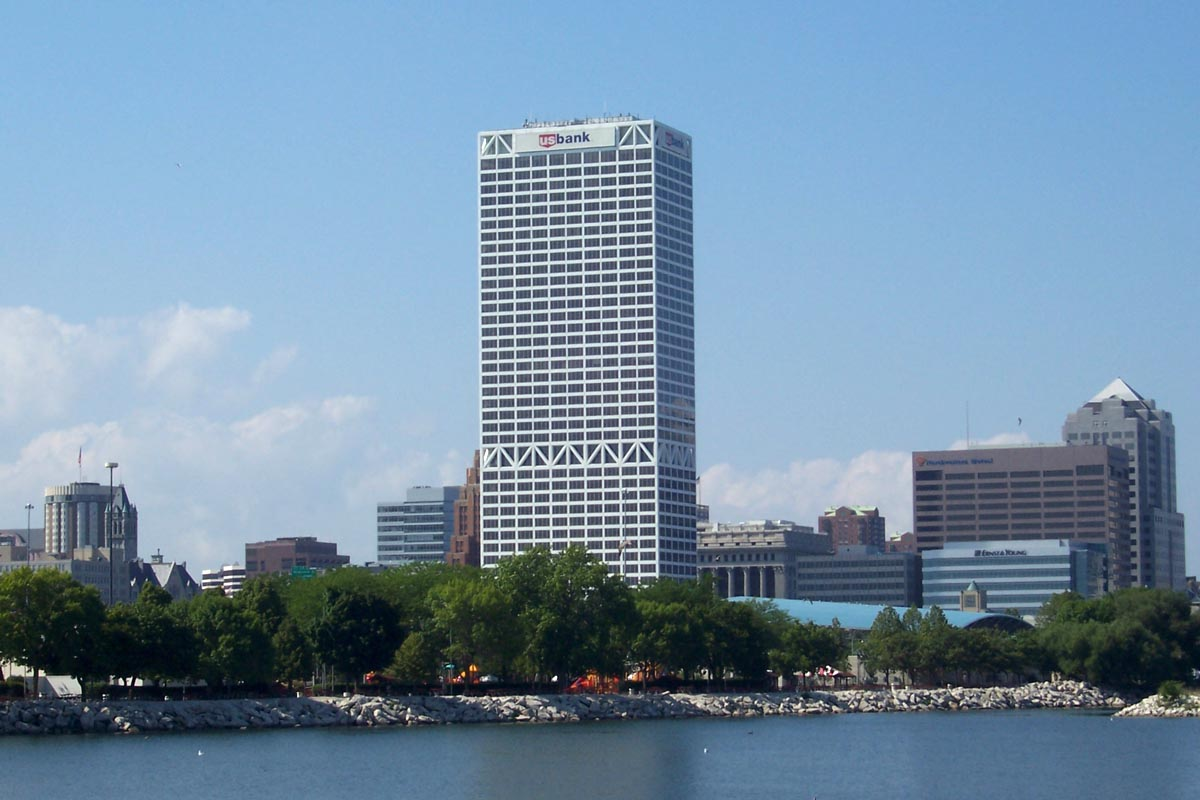
US Bank Center, formerly First Wisconsin Center

In 1929, First Wisconsin reorganized as a holding company, Wisconsin Bankshares Corporation, for the purpose of acquiring other banks. The holding company was renamed First Wisconsin Bankshares Corporation in 1960. In 1974, the name of holding company was changed again to First Wisconsin Corporation and finally to Firstar Corporation in 1988. Some of the subsidiary banks did not adopt its parent's new corporate name until as late as 1992 when the First Wisconsin brand was finally retired.

First Wisconsin constructed a new 42 stories tall headquarters building in Milwaukee that was called the First Wisconsin Center and is the tallest building in Wisconsin. This building was opened in 1973.

Unusual for a small regional bank, First Wisconsin was active during the 1970s and 1980s in lending money to companies in South America to assist those companies in the purchase of American products. Because of First Wisconsin's involvement in the international loan market, First Wisconsin became involved in the Latin American debt crisis and lost some money when some of their clients defaulted.

In January 1987, Roger Fitzsimonds replaced Gary B. Rafn as president and chief operating officer of First Wisconsin Corp.

In February 1991, Roger Fitzsimonds replaced John Hendee Jr. as chairman and chief executive officer of Firstar Corp.

==== Expansion in Wisconsin ====
In February 1989, Firstar announced the pending acquisition of the Elkhorn-based Elkhorn Bankshares Corporation for an undisclosed amount.

In September 1991, Firstar announced the pending acquisition of the Wauwatosa-based Federated Bank for $33 million in cash and stock.

In February 1994, Firstar announced the pending acquisition of the Franksville-based First Southeast Banking Corporation with its First Southeast Bank subsidiary for $55.4 million in stock.

==== Expansion in Illinois ====
First Wisconsin made its first expansion move outside the state of Wisconsin in September 1986 by announcing the pending acquisition of Glen Ellyn-based Du Page Bancshares Inc. with its Du Page Bank & Trust Co. subsidiary for $18.2 million in stock.

In October 1986, First Wisconsin announced the pending acquisition of the Naperville-based Naper Financial Corporation with its two subsidiary banks for $43 million in cash.

In March 1987, First Wisconsin announced the pending acquisition of the Northbrook-based North Shore Bancorp Inc. with its Bank of the North Shore subsidiary for $6.16 million.

In August 1992, Firstar announced the pending acquisition of the Deerfield-based DSB Corporation with its Deerfield State Bank subsidiary for an undisclosed amount. The acquisition was completed in February 1993.

In August 1994, Firstar announced the pending acquisition of the Chicago-based First Colonial Bankshares Corporation for $314 million in stock. At the time of the announcement, First Colonial was the parent of 17 community banks with a total of 30 locations. The acquisition was completed in February 1995.

In August 1994, Firstar announced the pending acquisition of the Moline-based First Moline Financial Corporation with its First Federal Savings Bank subsidiary for $9.8 million in stock. The acquisition was completed in April 1995.

==== Expansion in Minnesota ====
First Wisconsin entered the state of Minnesota for the first time by announcing in March 1987 the pending acquisition of the St. Louis Park-based Shelard Bancshares for $25 million in cash. At the time of the announcement, Shelard Bancshares was the parent of two banks with five locations.

In May 1988, First Wisconsin announced the pending acquisition of the Bloomington-based Metropolitan Bank Group for an undisclosed amount. At the time of the announcement, Metropolitan was the parent of six banks. The acquisition was completed in November 1988.

In July 1988, First Wisconsin announced the pending acquisition of the St. Anthony-based St. Anthony Bancorp. with its St. Anthony National Bank subsidiary for an undisclosed amount.

In September 1988, First Wisconsin announced the pending acquisition of the Stillwater-based Stillwater Holding Company with its two bank subsidiaries for an undisclosed amount.

In January 1990, Firstar announced the pending acquisition of the St. Louis Park-based First Western Bank with five branch offices for an undisclosed amount.

In August 1994, Firstar announced the pending acquisition of Wayzata-based Investors Bank Corporation with its Investors Savings Bank subsidiary for $106 million in stock. The acquisition was completed in April 1995.

In January 1996, Firstar announced the pending acquisition of Saint Paul-based American Bancorporation for $220 million in stock and cash. The acquisition was completed in July 1996.

==== Expansion in Arizona ====
In February 1989, Firstar announced the pending acquisition of Phoenix-based Metro Bancorp with its two branch office Metropolitan Bank subsidiary for an undisclosed amount.

==== Expansion in Iowa ====
In August 1990, Firstar announced the pending acquisition of Des Moines-based Banks of Iowa with its 12 subsidiary banks for $200 million in stock. The acquisition was completed in April 1991.

In July 1995, Firstar announced the pending acquisition of Dubuque-based Harvest Financial Corporation with its Harvest Savings Bank subsidiary for $32.7 million in stock. The acquisition was completed in January 1996 for $35.9 million in stock.

=== Acquisition by Star Banc Corporation ===
By the end of 1997, some stock market analysts speculated that Firstar was a prime takeover candidate based upon the performance of its stock in recent months and in view of the recent acquisition of First of America by National City and rumors of Banc One was in the process of acquiring First Chicago NBD.

In July 1998, Cincinnati, Ohio-based Star Banc Corporation (formerly First National Cincinnati Corporation), parent of Star Bank, announced the pending acquisition of Firstar Corporation for $7.3 billion in stock. At the time of the announcement, Firstar had banking offices in Wisconsin, Illinois, Minnesota, Arizona, Iowa, Ohio, and Missouri while Star Banc had banking offices in Ohio, Indiana, Kentucky, and Tennessee. Under the merger agreement, former Firstar board members would have 14 out of 32 directors seats on the board of the new corporation and could help control the direction of the new combined company. It was decided that the new combined company would be based in Milwaukee and that the new company would use the Firstar name and have its stock traded on the New York Stock Exchange under the symbol FRS. It was also announced that Star Chairman and Chief Executive Jerry Grundhofer would become president and chief executive while Firstar Chairman and Chief Executive Roger Fitzsimonds would become chairman. The merger was completed in November 1998.

==== Expansion in Missouri ====
Just five months later the newly combined Firstar announced in May 1999 the pending acquisition of St. Louis-based Mercantile Bancorporation for $10.6 billion in stock. The acquisition was completed in September 1999. After the merger, Jerry Grundhofer remained as president and chief executive officer of Firstar. Thomas H. Jacobsen, Mercantile's chief executive became chairman of Firstar.

==== Expansion in Tennessee ====
In July 2000, First Union announced that they were leaving the state of Tennessee and were selling their 41 branch offices there to Firstar for an undisclosed amount. Firstar had previously entered Tennessee by inheriting existing branch offices from Star Banc.

=== U.S. Bancorp ===
In October 2000, Firstar announced the pending acquisition of U.S. Bancorp of Minneapolis, Minnesota for $21 Billion in stock. Firstar completed its buyout of U.S. Bancorp on February 27, 2001 and changed its name to U.S. Bancorp. Under the merger agreement, Jerry Grundhofer, president and chief executive officer of Firstar, would continue in those positions in the combined company while his older brother, John Grundhofer, chairman, president and chief executive officer of U.S. Bancorp, would serve as chairman of the board in the combined company until his planned retirement on December 31, 2002. While Firstar was the nominal survivor, the merged company took the more recognizable U.S. Bancorp name and moved to U.S. Bancorp's old headquarters in Minneapolis.

To allow the merger to proceed, the U.S. Department of Justice required Firstar to sell 11 branch offices in the Minneapolis-area and 2 in Council Bluffs, Iowa. Bremer Bank of Saint Paul, Minnesota purchased the 11 Minneapolis-area Firstar offices while Liberty Bank of West Des Moines, Iowa purchased the 2 Council Bluffs offices.

To this day, U.S. Bancorp retains Star Banc/Firstar's pre-2000 stock price history. All of present-day U.S. Bancorp's SEC filings before 1998 are under Star Banc, and all filings from 1998 to 2000 are under Firstar.

== See also ==
- Firstar Center
- Roger L. Fitzsimonds
- Oliver Clyde Fuller
