= John F. Grundhofer =

American businessman (1939–2021)

- Born: January 1, 1939; U.S.
- Died: January 24, 2021 (aged 82); U.S.
- Occupation: Company director
- Known for: Being kidnapped and held hostage in 1990

John F. Grundhofer (January 1, 1939 – January 24, 2021) was a director of Donaldson Company, Securian Financial Group Inc., and BJ's Restaurant & Brewery. He served as Chairman (1990–1997 and 1999–2002), Chief Executive Officer (1990–2001) and President (1990–1999 and 2000–2001) of U.S. Bancorp (formerly First Bank System), a financial services provider. On retirement he was succeeded by his brother Jerry Grundhofer.

== Early life ==
He was a graduate of Loyola High School (Los Angeles) and Loyola Marymount University. He received an MBA in Finance from the University of Southern California.

== Career ==
During his tenure at U.S. Bancorp, Grundhofer was credited with transforming the institution from a regional bank into one of the nation's largest, emphasizing efficiency and strategic acquisitions. His leadership style emphasized cost control, leading to several high-profile mergers during the 1990's.

After retiring, Grundhofer chaired the board of the Guthrie Theater and served on the boards of the Minnesota Orchestra and the University of St. Thomas.

== Personal life ==
Grundhofer was purportedly kidnapped from a Minneapolis parking garage in November 1990. He escaped after being bound and stuffed in a sleeping bag. No one was ever charged in the kidnapping.

Grundhofer died on January 24, 2021, in Palm Desert California, at the age of 82.

== See also ==
- List of kidnappings
