= U.S. Bancorp =

American multinational banking institution

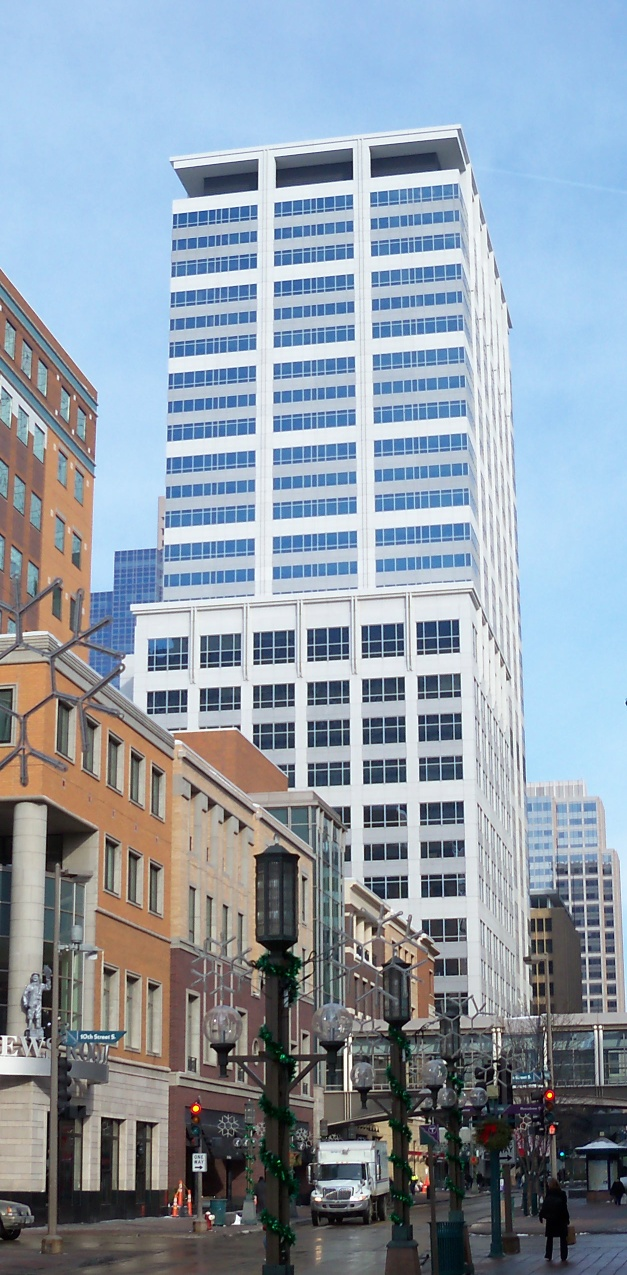
- U.S. Bancorp's headquarters in Minneapolis
- Trade name: U.S. Bank
- Type: Public
- Traded as: NYSE: USB; S&P 100 component; S&P 500 component
- ISIN: US9029733048
- Industry: Financial services
- Founded: July 13, 1863; 163 years ago
- Headquarters: U.S. Bancorp Center, Minneapolis, Minnesota, U.S.
- Number of locations: 3,661 branches (2024); 4,771 ATMs (2024)
- Key people: Gunjan Kedia (chairman, president and CEO)
- Products: banking; asset management; wealth management; credit cards; insurance; investment management; mortgage loans; private equity
- Revenue: 23,325,000,000 United States dollar (2020)
- Net income: ▲US$7.57 billion (2025)
- Total assets: ▲US$692 billion (2025)
- Total equity: ▲US$65.2 billion (2025)
- Number of employees: 70,000+ (2024)
- Subsidiaries: Elavon; Talech; Syncada
- Capital ratio: 10.9% Tier 1 (2025)
- Website: www.usbank.com/about-us-bank.html

U.S. Bancorp (stylized as us bancorp) is an American multinational banking institution headquartered in Minneapolis, Minnesota, and incorporated in Delaware. It is the 7th-largest bank in the United States as of March 2026. As the largest bank in the Midwestern United States, it is considered a domestic systemically important bank (D-SIB) by the Federal Reserve. It is the parent company of its primary operating entity, U.S. Bank National Association, which does business as U.S. Bank (stylized as us bank). The company provides banking, investment, mortgage, trust, and payment services to individuals, businesses, governmental entities, and other financial institutions.

The firm's early history can be traced to 1891, operating under the second-oldest banking charter granted in 1863 following the passage of the National Bank Act. Since inception, dozens of regional mergers and acquisitions throughout the Upper Midwest and Western United States led to the creation of modern U.S. Bancorp. As a diversified holding company, U.S. Bancorp has acquired multiple subsidiaries since the late 2010s. Its retail credit card offerings are provided via the Visa network in the U.S. and abroad.

U.S. Bancorp's annual revenue levels have it ranked on the Fortune 500, with its public stock trading within both the S&P 500 and S&P 100 indexes. It was included in the 2024 Forbes Global 2000 for its sales, profitability, asset base, and market value, among other financial institutions. U.S. Bancorp sponsors a variety of cultural events, transportation hubs, and sporting venues, including U.S. Bank Stadium. U.S. Bank is one of the largest asset custodians in the country with more than $11.7 trillion under administration as of June 2025.

== History ==
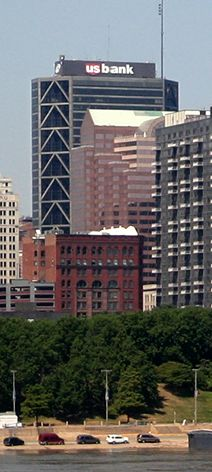
One U.S. Bank Plaza in downtown St. Louis, Missouri

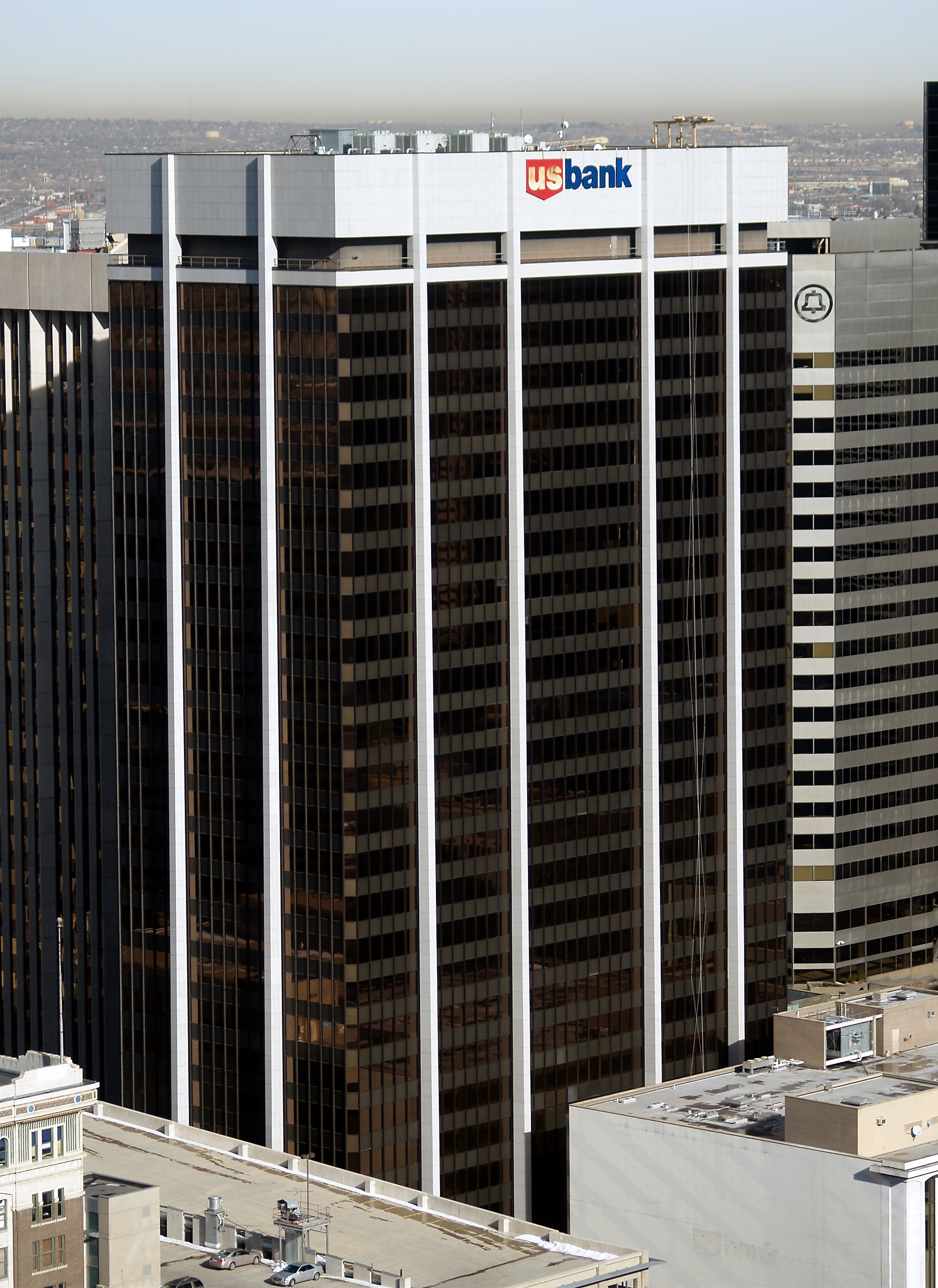
The U.S. Bank tower in downtown Denver, Colorado

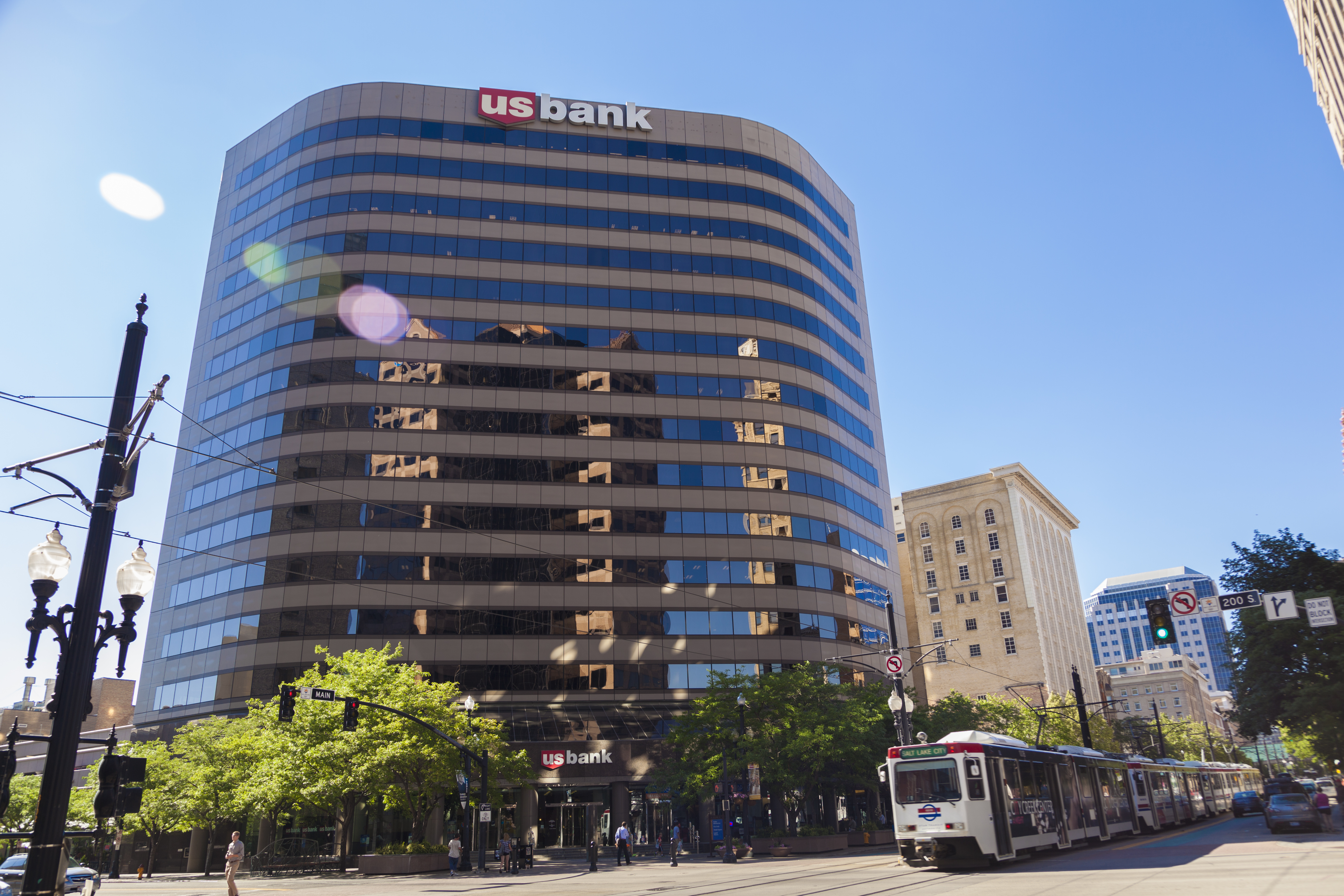
U.S. Bank tower in Salt Lake City, Utah

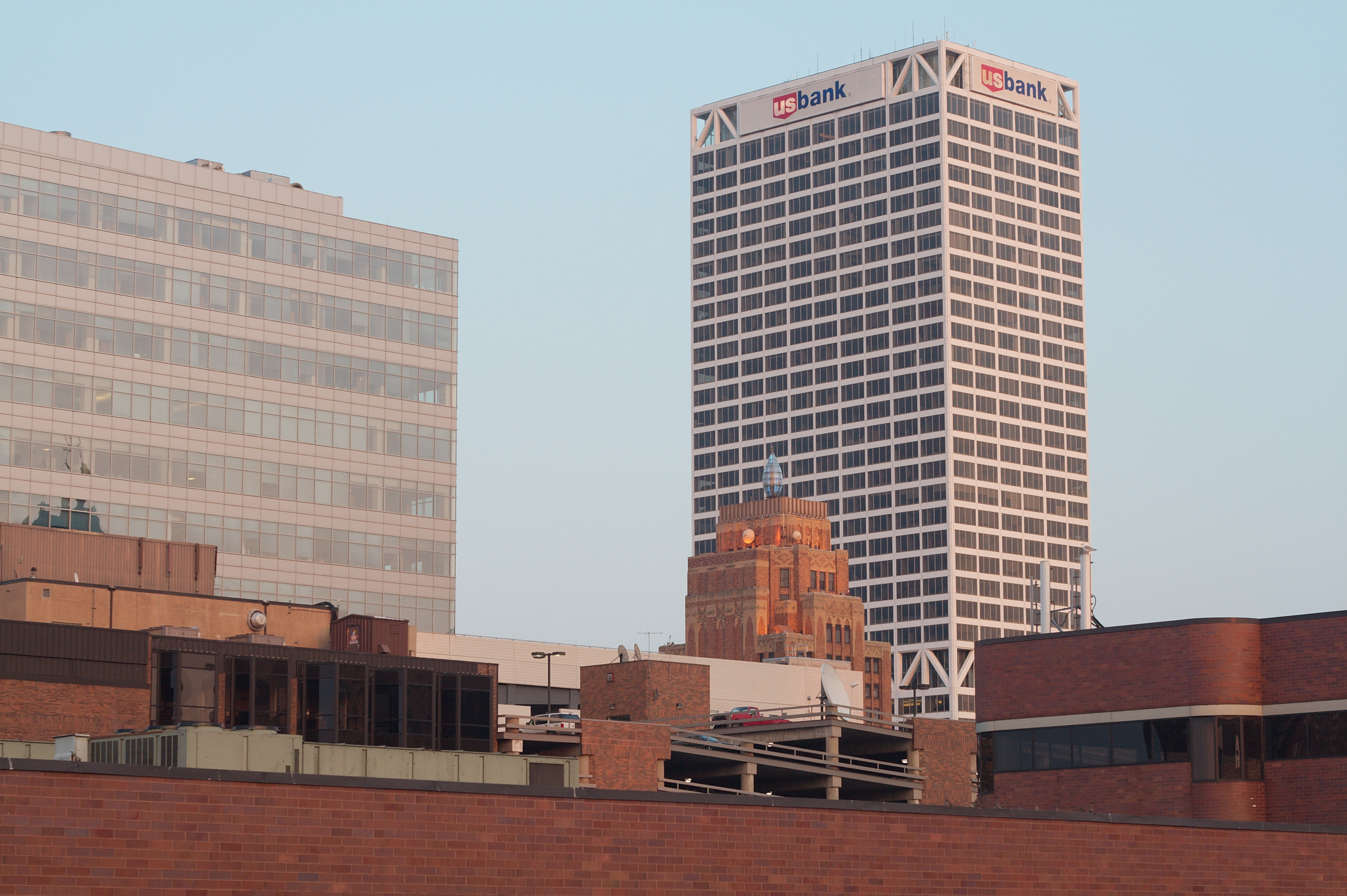
U.S. Bank Center in Milwaukee, Wisconsin

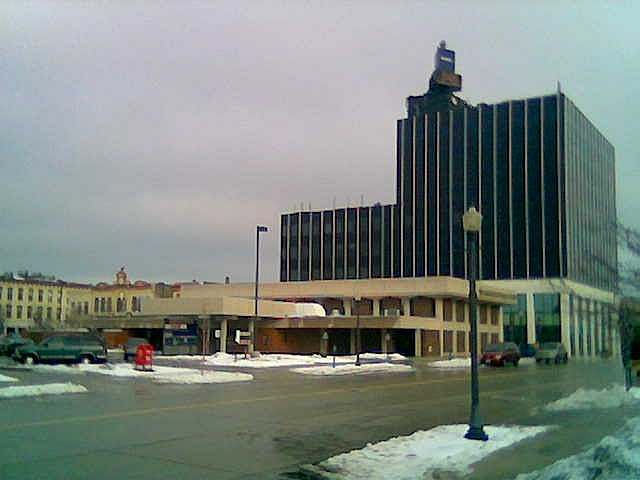
U.S. Bank Building in Sheboygan, Wisconsin

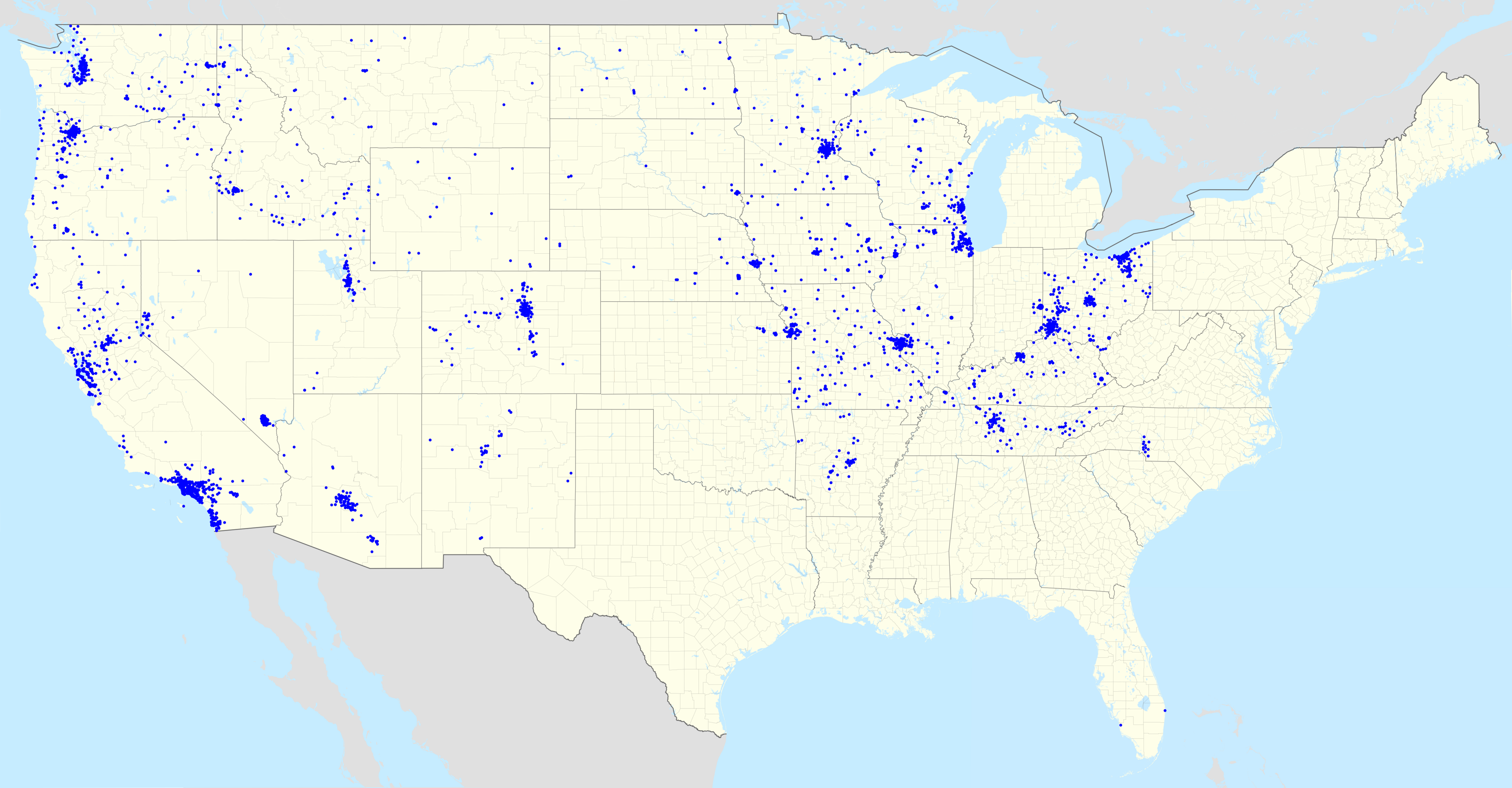
U.S. Bancorp footprint

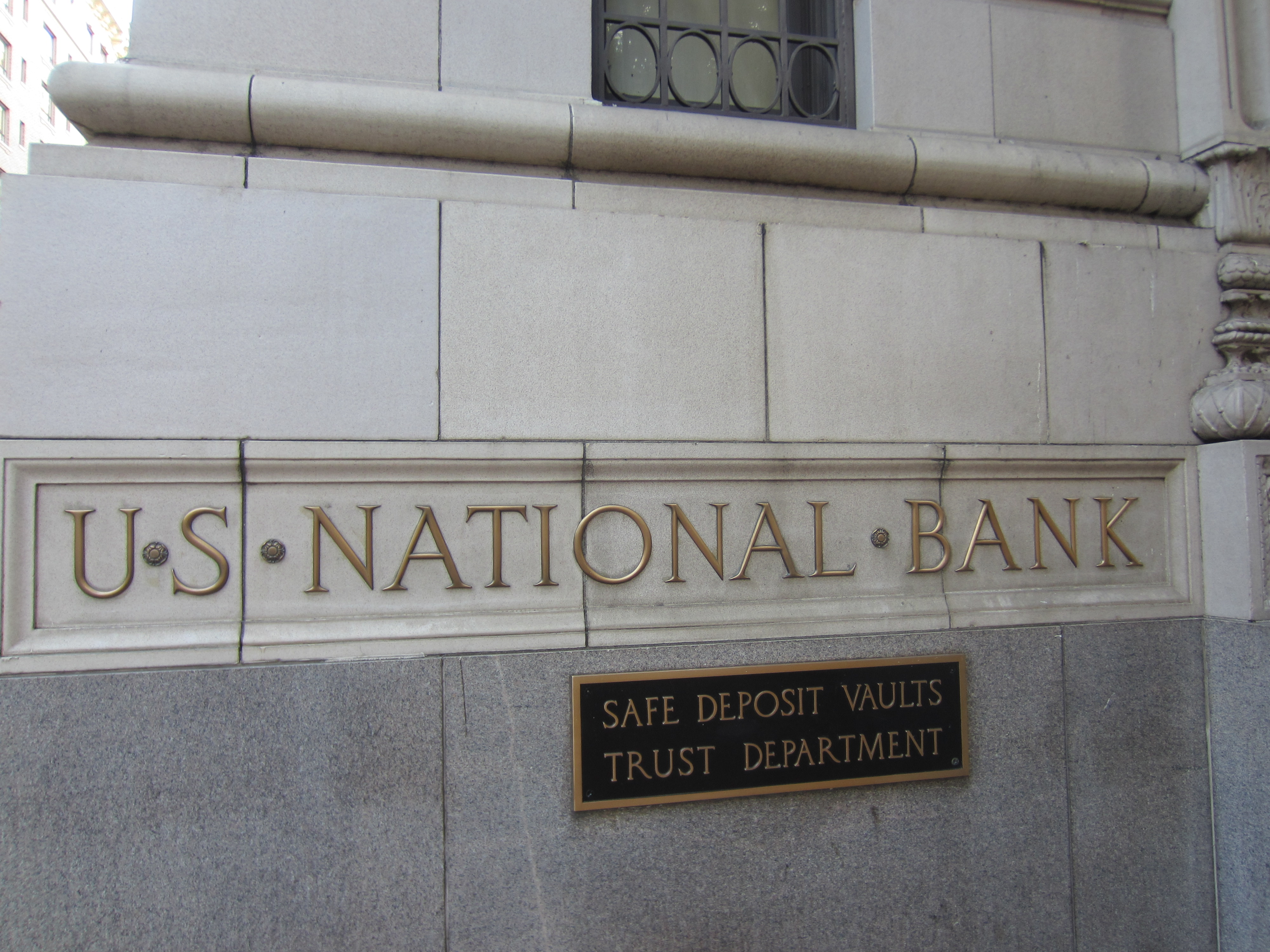
United States National Bank of Portland, Oregon

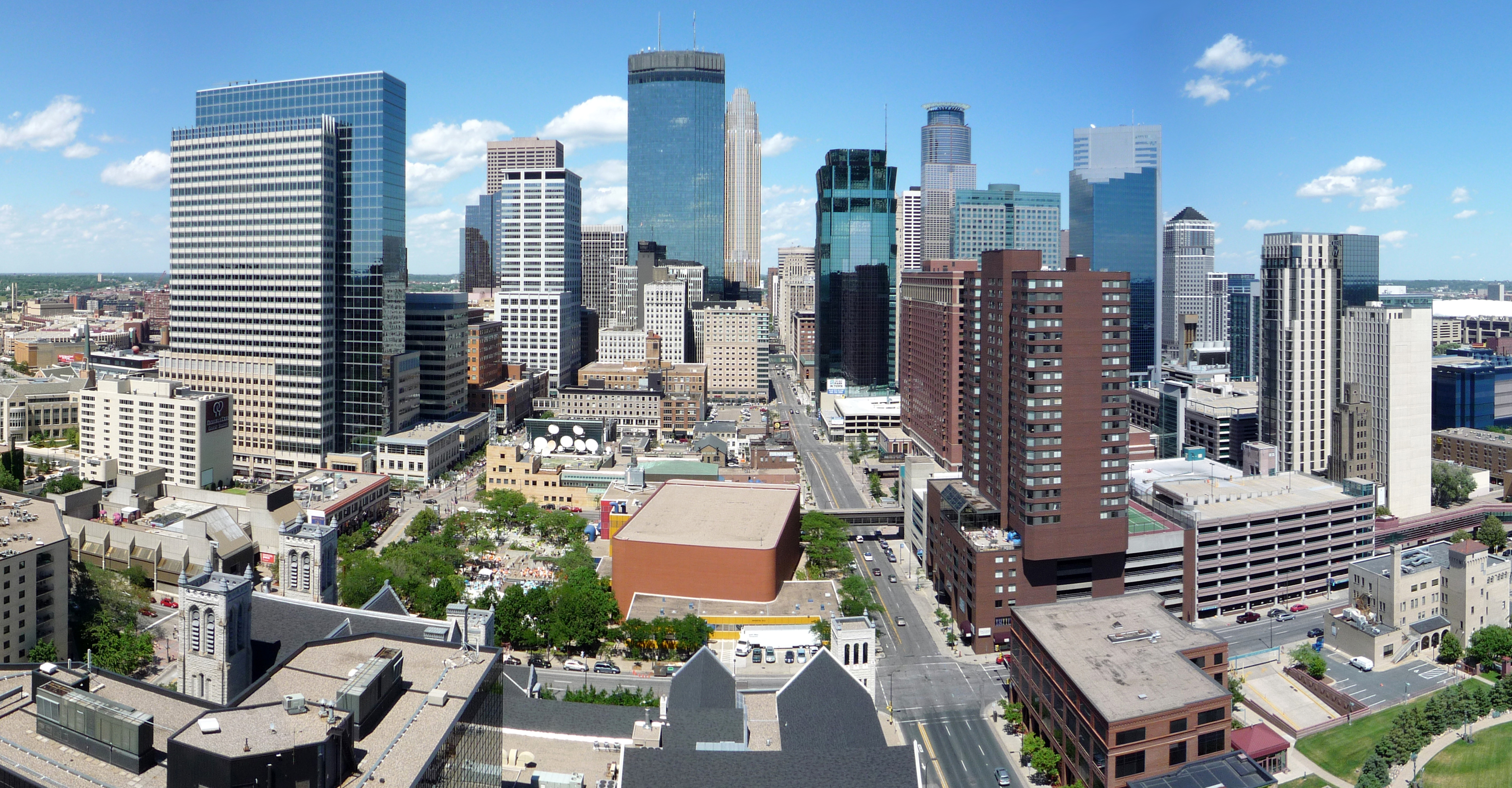
Downtown Minneapolis; Capella Tower is the circular building on the center-right.

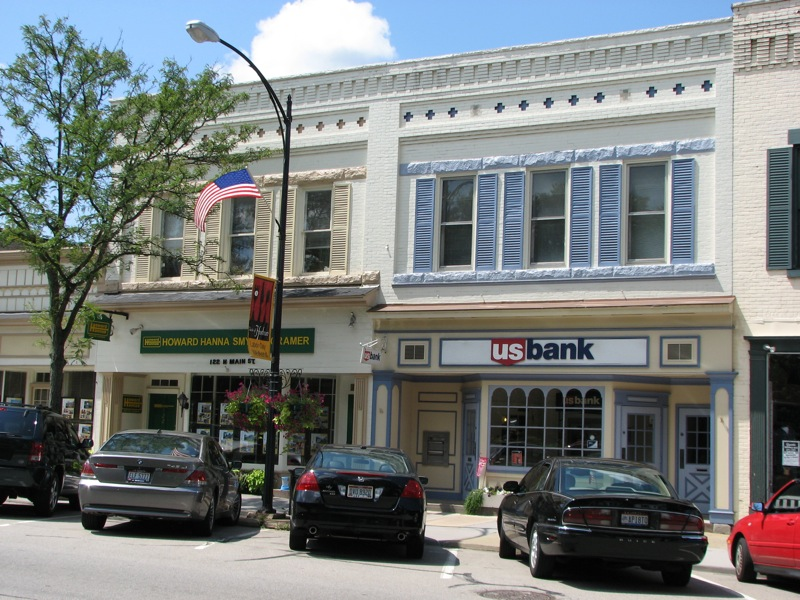
U.S. Bank in Hudson, Ohio

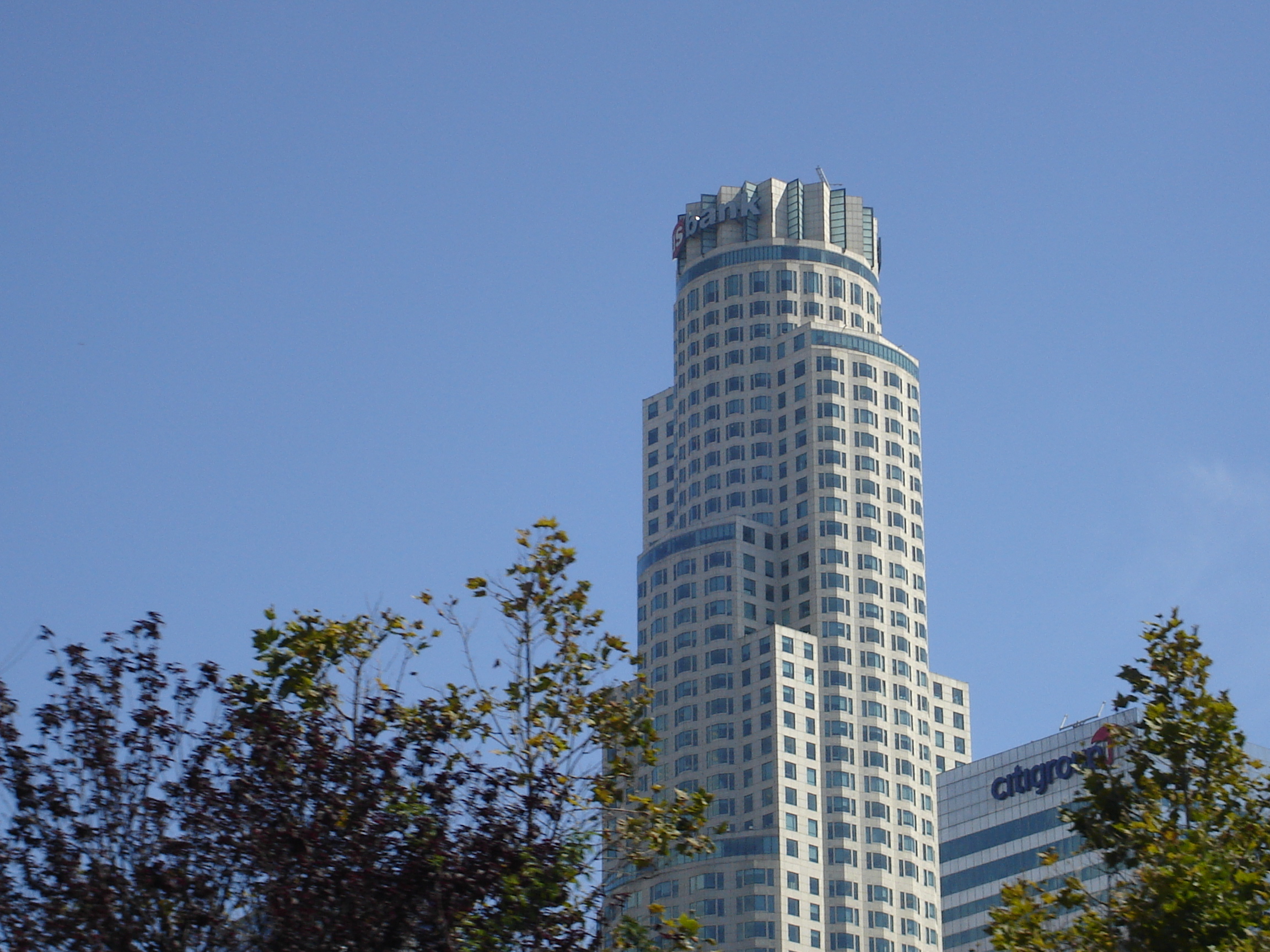
The U.S. Bank Tower in downtown Los Angeles, California

The U.S. Bank name first appeared as United States National Bank of Portland, established in Portland, Oregon, in 1891. In 1902, it merged with Ainsworth National Bank of Portland, but kept the U.S. National Bank name. It changed its name to the United States National Bank of Oregon in 1964.

The central part of the franchise dates from 1864, with the formation of First National Bank of Minneapolis. In 1929, that bank merged with First National Bank of St. Paul (also formed in 1864) and several smaller Upper Midwest banks to form the First Bank Stock Corporation, which changed its name to First Bank System in 1968.

In the eastern part of the franchise, Farmers and Millers Bank in Milwaukee opened its doors in 1853, growing into the First National Bank of Milwaukee and eventually becoming First Wisconsin and ultimately Firstar Corporation. In Cincinnati, First National Bank of Cincinnati opened for business on July 13, 1863, under National Charter #24—the charter that U.S. Bancorp still operates under today, and one of the oldest active national bank charters in the nation. U.S. Bancorp claims 1863 as its founding date. Despite having started up in the midst of the Civil War, First National Bank of Cincinnati went on to survive many decades to grow into Star Bank.

=== U.S. Bancorp of Oregon era ===
In January 1969, the U.S. National Bank of Oregon reorganized as a holding company, U.S. Bancorp, after receiving authorization from its bank directors on September 9, 1968 and subsequently receiving legal approval to proceed from the Comptroller of the Currency on November 28, 1968. LeRoy B. Staver, president, and chief executive officer of the bank, was appointed chairman and chief executive officer for the new holding company while Robert B. Wilson was appointed president of the holding company and also executive vice president for the bank. Wilson later resigned as president in December 1972 and his position was filled eight months later by John A. Elorriaga.

Staver retired in October 1974 and was succeeded by John Elorriaga who was promoted to chairman and chief executive officer while Carl W. Mays Jr was named president in Elorriaga's place.

A major change in the organization of leadership in the U.S. Bancorp of Oregon occurred in August 1983. Although Elorriaga remained as chairman and chief executive officer for the firm, Mays was appointed to the new position of executive assistant to the chairman while Edmund P. Jensen was appointed president as a replacement to Mays, and Roger L. Breezley was appointed to the new post of chief operating officer.

In December 1986, U.S. Bancorp of Oregon announced the pending acquisition of the Forest Grove, Oregon-based Valley National Corporation (not to be confused with the Phoenix, Arizona, company of the same name) with its five-branch Valley National Bank of Forest Grove subsidiary for $13.7 million (~$34.1 million in 2025) in stock. U.S. Bancorp of Oregon made its first acquisition outside the state of Oregon by announcing in December 1986 the pending acquisition of the Spokane, Washington-based Old National Bancorp with its Old National Bank of Washington and First National Bank of Spokane subsidiaries for $174 million (~$433 million in 2025). The acquisition was completed in July 1987 on the first day that the state of Washington had allowed bank acquisitions by out-of-state companies. In December 1986, U.S. Bancorp of Oregon announced the pending acquisition of the Camas, Washington-based Heritage Bank for $2.8 million (~$6.97 million in 2025).

In May 1987, U.S. Bancorp of Oregon announced the pending acquisition of the Seattle, Washington-based Peoples Bancorp with its Peoples National Bank subsidiary for $275 million (~$668 million in 2025) in stock. The acquisition was completed in December 1987. After the acquisition, Peoples and Old National were combined to form U.S. Bank of Washington. John Elorriaga retired as chairman of the board and chief executive officer in November 1987 and was replaced by Roger L. Breezley while Jensen continued as president. In December 1987, U.S. Bancorp of Oregon announced the pending acquisition of the Bellingham, Washington-based Mt Baker Bank for $25 million (~$60.7 million in 2025). U.S. Bancorp of Oregon entered the state of California by announcing in April 1988 the pending acquisition of the Eureka, California-based Bank of Loleta with seven branch offices in Humboldt and Del Norte counties for $15.3 million (~$35.9 million in 2025) in cash. The acquisition was completed in December 1988 and was renamed U.S. Bank of California.

In April 1988, U.S. Bancorp of Oregon announced the pending acquisition of the Bellingham, Washington-based Northwestern Commercial Bank for $15.5 million (~$36.3 million in 2025). The acquisition was completed in November 1988. In July 1988, U.S. Bancorp of Oregon announced the pending acquisition of the Auburn, Washington-based Western Independent Bancshares with its Auburn Valley Bank subsidiary for $4.25 million (~$9.97 million in 2025) in cash.

In October 1989, U.S. Bancorp of Oregon announced the pending acquisition of the Sacramento, California-based Mother Lode Savings Bank with three branch offices for $5.3 million (~$12 million in 2025). The acquisition was completed in August 1990. This acquisition was one of the first of a thrift by a commercial bank in the nation since legislation permitting such takeovers went into effect.

During the late 1980s, U.S. Bancorp of Oregon made several attempts to enter the state of Idaho by the acquisition of an existing Idaho-based bank, the only method then allowed under Idaho law, but failed when the price got too high. In March 1990, U.S. Bancorp of Oregon announced that they would establish a bank through a loophole in Federal banking law that allows the Office of the Comptroller of the Currency to allow the relocation of bank headquarters within 30 miles of their present location without regards to state boundaries and state regulations. So U.S. Bancorp of Oregon announced that they plan to transfer the existing branches of the First National Bank of Spokane to the U.S. Bancorp of Washington and then ask permission from the Office of the Comptroller of the Currency to move the headquarters of First National from Spokane, Washington, to Coeur d'Alene, Idaho. After receiving Federal approval, First National was finally moved in February 1992 and renamed U.S. Bank of Idaho.

In July 1990, U.S. Bancorp of Oregon announced the pending acquisition of the Auburn, California-based HeartFed Financial Corporation with its Heart Federal Savings and Loan subsidiary for $107.8 million (~$234 million in 2025) in stock. At the time of the announcement, Heart Federal Savings had 29 branch offices in northern California. The acquisition was completed in March 1991 for $118 million (~$248 million in 2025). In November 1991, Edmund P. Jensen was given the post of chief operating officer in addition to his duties as president, making him a possible successor to Breezley.

In February 1992, U.S. Bancorp of Oregon announced the pending acquisition of the 20 branch offices in Northern California and 29 branch offices in Nevada for $70 million (~$144 million in 2025) that were being divested by Bankamerica Corporation as a result of Bank of America's impending acquisition of Security Pacific Corporation. This acquisition gave U.S. Bancorp of Oregon its first presence in the state of Nevada.

Another major change in the organization of leadership in the U.S. Bancorp of Oregon occurred in January 1993. While retaining his position as chief operating officer, Edmund P. Jensen was appointed vice-chairman while giving his position of president to Kevin R. Kelly. At the same time, Gerry B. Cameron was appointed vice-chairman. Ten months later, Jensen resigned to become president of Visa Inc. In January 1994, Gerry Cameron was first appointed chief operating officer as a replacement to Jensen and later appointed chief executive officer just three weeks later. Kelly submitted his resignation as president in March 1994 and Breezley finally gave up the chairmanship to Cameron in April 1994.

In May 1995, U.S. Bancorp of Oregon announced the pending acquisition of the Boise, Idaho-based West One Bancorp for $1.8 billion (~$3.47 billion in 2025). At the time of the announcement, West One had branch offices in Idaho, Oregon, Washington, and Utah while U.S. Bancorp of Oregon had branch offices in Oregon, Washington, California, Idaho, and Nevada. The acquisition was completed in December 1995 and gave U.S. Bancorp of Oregon its first entry into the state of Utah. As part of the acquisition deal, West One's chairman and chief executive Daniel R. Nelson would become the chief operating officer and president of U.S. Bancorp and he would later be Cameron's successor as chairman and CEO upon Cameron's planned retirement in three years. Since both U.S. Bancorp and West One had overlapping territories in Oregon and Washington, the U.S. Justice Department would only allow the acquisition to proceed if U.S. Bancorp would sell off 27 branch offices in Washington and Oregon. As a result of the regulatory ruling, U.S. Bancorp sold 25 branch offices in Oregon, four in central Washington and one in Idaho to First Hawaiian Bank for $38 million in cash.

In February 1996, U.S. Bancorp of Oregon announced the pending acquisition of the San Ramon, California-based California Bancshares for $309 million (~$585 million in 2025) in stock. California Bancshares had a total of 38 branches in the East San Francisco Bay Area in nine separate banks that included Alameda First National, Community First National, Modesto Banking Co., Commercial Bank of Fremont, Lamorinda National Bank, Bank of San Ramon Valley, Westside Bank, Concord Commercial Bank and Bank of Milpitas. The acquisition was completed in June 1996.

In September 1996, U.S. Bancorp of Oregon announced the pending acquisition of the St. George, Utah-based Sun Capital Bancorp with its three-branch office Sun Capital Bank subsidiary for $15.5 million (~$29.3 million in 2025). The acquisition was completed in January 1997. In December 1996, U.S. Bancorp of Oregon announced the pending acquisition of the Sacramento, California-based Business & Professional Bank for $35 million (~$66.2 million in 2025) in cash. The acquisition was completed in May 1997.

=== First Bank System era ===
First Bank System used this logo from 1979. It incorporates the silhouette of the number one.

In March 1997, the Minneapolis, Minnesota-based First Bank System announced the pending acquisition of U.S. Bancorp of Oregon for $9 billion (~$16.7 billion in 2025) in stock. At the time of the announcement, U.S. Bancorp of Oregon had banking offices in Oregon, Washington, California, Idaho and Utah while First Bank System had banking offices in Minnesota, Colorado, Nebraska, North Dakota, South Dakota, Montana, Iowa, Illinois, Wisconsin, Kansas, and Wyoming. Under the terms of the acquisition, First Bank System was the nominal survivor, and the newly merged company was headquartered in Minneapolis. However, it took the more recognizable U. S. Bancorp name. John F. Grundhofer, chairman and chief executive of First Bank, was appointed president and chief executive of the new company while Gerry B. Cameron, chairman, and chief executive of U.S. Bancorp of Oregon, was appointed chairman of the new company, which he held until his retirement in 1998. The acquisition was completed in August 1997. Approximately 4000 jobs were eliminated, mostly in Portland.

==== Brief history of First Bank prior to acquisition ====
First Bank System can trace its roots to the formation of First National Bank of Minneapolis in 1864. In 1929, the First National Bank of Minneapolis joined with the First National Bank of St. Paul to form a joint holding company for both banks that was called the First Bank Stock Corporation, while keeping both subsidiary banks legally separate. The new holding company quickly grew by acquiring other banks in the four-state region before the Bank Holding Company Act of 1956 prohibited such actions. First Bank Stock Corporation was renamed First Bank System Inc. in 1968.

==== U.S. Bancorp after takeover by First Bank System ====
In September 1997, the new U.S. Bancorp (having dropped the "of Oregon" suffix), formerly First Bank System, announced the pending acquisition of the St. Cloud, Minnesota-based Zappco, Inc. with its three banks and six banking locations for an undisclosed amount. At the time of the announcement, U.S. Bancorp had more than 1,000 banking offices in the states of Minnesota, Oregon, Washington, Colorado, California, Idaho, Nebraska, North Dakota, Nevada, South Dakota, Montana, Iowa, Illinois, Utah, Wisconsin, Kansas, and Wyoming. The acquisition was completed in December 1997.

In March 1998, U.S. Bancorp announced the pending acquisition of the Vancouver, Washington-based Northwest Bancshares with its 10-branch offices Northwest National Bank subsidiary for an undisclosed amount. In October 1998, the U.S. Justice Department agreed to allow the acquisition to proceed on the condition that one of the Northwest National Bank branch offices was to be sold. The acquisition was completed in December 1998 after U.S. Bancorp sold the requested banking office to Centennial Bank of Eugene.

At the end of 1998, Gerry Cameron retired as chairman and handed the position over to John Grundhofer who added the title of chairman to his other positions of president and chief executive officer.

In February 1999, U.S. Bancorp announced the pending acquisition of the San Diego-based Bank of Commerce with its 10 branch offices for $314 million (~$570 million in 2025) in stock. The acquisition was finalized in July 1999. In May 1999, U.S. Bancorp announced the pending acquisition of the Newport Beach, California-based Western Bancorp with its Santa Monica Bank and Southern California Bank subsidiaries and a total of 31 branch offices for $904 million (~$1.64 billion in 2025) in stock. At the time of the announcement, U.S. Bancorp had 98 branch offices within California. The acquisition was finalized in November 1999 for $1.04 billion (~$1.89 billion in 2025) in stock.

In July 1999, Philip G. Heasley was appointed president and chief operating officer of U.S. Bancorp. John Grundhofer had handed over the position of president to Heasley while still retaining the titles of chairman and chief executive officer. Heasley had assisted Grundhofer in turning the company around from near insolvency when the company was originally known as First Bank until it became a successful financial institution large enough to absorb other banks, including U.S. Bancorp of Oregon in 1997. Heasley resigned the following year to join Bank One as the head of their First USA credit card unit around the same time Firstar was about to takeover U.S. Bancorp.

In September 1999, U.S. Bancorp announced the pending acquisition of the San Diego-based Peninsula Bank with its 11 branch offices for $104 million (~$189 million in 2025) in stock. In early January 2000, a group of Peninsula Bank stockholders tried to stop the merger because the initial merger agreement was made prior to the huge 27% single-day drop in the value of U.S. Bancorp stock which effectively lowered the purchase price. The acquisition was later completed in January 2000 at a 10% reduction of the original price negotiated.

In June 2000, U.S. Bancorp announced the acquisition of the San Diego-based Scripps Financial Corporation with its nine-branch office Scripps Bank subsidiary for $155 million (~$275 million in 2025) in stock. The acquisition was completed in October 2000.

=== Firstar era ===
In October 2000, Firstar Corporation of Milwaukee, Wisconsin, announced the pending acquisition of U.S. Bancorp for $21 billion (~$37.3 billion in 2025) in stock. The merger was completed on February 27, 2001. While Firstar was the nominal survivor, the merged company took the U.S. Bancorp name and moved to old U.S. Bancorp's headquarters in Minneapolis. Under the merger agreement, Jerry Grundhofer, president and chief executive officer of Firstar, would continue in those positions in the combined company while his older brother, John Grundhofer, chairman, president and chief executive officer of U.S. Bancorp, would serve as chairman of the board in the combined company until his planned retirement on December 31, 2002. The merged company retained some administrative functions in Milwaukee and Cincinnati.

To allow the merger to proceed, the U.S. Department of Justice required Firstar to sell 11 branch offices in the Minneapolis-area and 2 in Council Bluffs, Iowa. Bremer Bank of Saint Paul, Minnesota, purchased the 11 Minneapolis-area Firstar offices while Liberty Bank of West Des Moines, Iowa, purchased the 2 Council Bluffs offices.

==== Brief history of Firstar prior to acquisition ====
Firstar Corporation traced its roots to the founding of the Farmer's and Millers Bank in Milwaukee in 1853, which by 1919 evolved into First Wisconsin National Bank. However, the Firstar that took over U.S. Bancorp in 2001 was actually the same company and leadership that acquired Firstar 27 months earlier in 1998, namely Star Banc Corporation. That bank, in turn, traced its roots to the founding of First National Bank of Cincinnati in 1863. Jerry Grundhofer and his team from Star Banc were instrumental in both acquisitions.

Present-day U.S. Bancorp retains Star Banc's pre-1998 stock price history. As mentioned above, it claims 1863 as its founding date, and operates under the charter originally granted to First National Bank of Cincinnati. Additionally, all SEC filings before 1998 are under Star Banc, and all filings from 1998 to 2000 are under Firstar.

==== U.S. Bancorp after takeover by Firstar ====
In April 2001, the new U.S. Bancorp announced the pending acquisition of all 20 branch offices in California of the Encino-based Pacific Century Bank from its Honolulu-based parent Pacific Century Financial Corporation. The acquisition was completed in September 2001. In July 2002, U.S. Bancorp announced the pending acquisition of all 57 retail banking branches of the San Mateo, California-based Bay View Bank from its Bay View Capital Corporation parent for $429 million (~$733 million in 2025). The acquisition was completed in November 2002. On New Years Day 2003, John Grundhofer retired as chairman of U.S. Bancorp and handed the position to his younger brother Jerry Grundhofer, who added the title of chairman to his other positions of president and chief executive officer in the corporation.

In May 2004, U.S. Bancorp announced that it was acquiring the $34 billion (~$55.5 billion in 2025) corporate trust bond administration business from National City Corporation. In October 2004, Richard K. Davis was appointed chief operating officer and president of U.S. Bancorp. Jerry Grundhofer had handed over the position of president to Davis while still retaining the titles of chairman and chief executive officer. Davis had been a protege of Grundhofer since their days together at Star Banc Corporation and had assisted in the takeover of Firstar by Star Banc in 1998 and the later acquisition of U.S. Bancorp by Firstar in 2001.

U.S. Bancorp acquired Genpass along with its MoneyPass ATM network subsidiary for an undisclosed amount in May 2005. In November 2005, U.S. Bancorp announced that it was acquiring the $410 billion corporate trust and institutional custody businesses of Wachovia Corporation for $720 million in cash.

In July 2006, U.S. Bancorp announced that it was acquiring the $123 billion (~$189 billion in 2025) municipal and corporate bond trustee business from SunTrust. In June 2006, U.S. Bancorp announced the pending acquisition of the Avon, Colorado-based Vail Banks Inc. with its WestStar Bank subsidiary and 23 locations for $98.6 million (~$151 million in 2025) in cash. The acquisition was completed in September 2006. In November 2006, U.S. Bancorp announced that it was acquiring the $30 billion (~$46 billion in 2025) municipal bond trustee business from LaSalle Bank. In November 2006, U.S. Bancorp announced the pending acquisition of the Great Falls, Montana-based United Financial Corporation with its Heritage Bank subsidiary for $71 million (~$109 million in 2025) in stock. The acquisition was completed in February 2007 and nearly double the branch presence of U.S. Bank in Montana. In December 2006, Jerry Grundhofer handed over the position of chief executive officer to president Richard Davis while Grundhofer remained chairman until his retirement the following year in December 2007. After Grundhofer's retirement in December 2007, Davis added the position of chairman to his other titles of president and chief executive officer.

In March 2008, the U.S. Bancorp announced the pending acquisition of the seven-office Los Angeles-based Mellon 1st Business Bank from the Bank of New York Mellon for an undisclosed amount in cash. The acquisition was completed in June 2008.

=== US Bancorp in the Great Financial Crisis (GFC) ===
On November 14, 2008, the U.S. Treasury invested $6,599,000,000 (~$9.67 billion in 2025) in preferred stock and warrants in the company via the Emergency Economic Stabilization Act of 2008. Weeks earlier, U.S. Bancorp had entered into acquisition talks with National City Corp. and had made an offer to buy National City until PNC Financial Services used its portion of TARP funds to outbid U.S. Bancorp and acquire National City instead. Had National City accepted U.S. Bancorp's offer, U.S. Bancorp would have expanded into Florida, Michigan and Pennsylvania (three states that as of 2023 still don't have a retail presence from U.S. Bancorp), but major divestments would've been made in Midwestern states, especially Ohio.

On November 21, 2008, the company acquired the failed Downey Savings & Loan Association and also the failed Pomona First Federal Bancorp in a transaction facilitated by the Federal Deposit Insurance Corporation for an undisclosed amount. Downey Savings had 170 branch offices in California and five branch offices in Arizona while PFF Bank had 38 branch offices in Southern California.

In April 2009, U.S. Bancorp acquired the assets and deposits of the failed Ketchum, Idaho-based First Bank of Idaho in a transaction facilitated by the FDIC. First Bank of Idaho had seven offices in Idaho and Wyoming, some of which operated under the name First Bank of the Tetons.

On June 17, 2009, the company redeemed the $6.6 billion of preferred stock and on July 15, 2009, it completed the purchase of a warrant held by the U.S. Treasury Department. This effectively concluded U.S. Bancorp's participation in the Capital Purchase Program. It was the first bank to repay the Troubled Asset Relief Program (TARP) funds.

=== US Bancorp post-GFC ===
On October 5, 2009, the company announced its acquisition of the $8 billion (~$11.7 billion in 2025) mutual fund administration and accounting servicing division of Fiduciary Management, Inc. for an undisclosed amount. On October 7, 2009, the company agreed to buy the bond trustee business of First Citizens Bank, a subsidiary of First Citizens BancShares Inc. for an undisclosed amount.

On October 20, 2009, the company completed a transaction to purchase the failed FBOP Corporation's nine subsidiary banks from the FDIC for an undisclosed amount. The banks included BankUSA, National Association with 2 offices in Arizona, Cal National Bank with 68 offices in California, Citizens National Bank with 1 office in Texas, Community Bank of Lemont with 1 office in Illinois, Madisonville State Bank with 1 office in Texas, North Houston Bank with 1 office in Texas, Pacific National Bank with 17 offices in California, Park National Bank with 31 offices in Illinois, and San Diego National Bank with 28 offices in California.

Since the company did not have a previous presence in Texas nor want one in the near future, the company subsequently sold the three banks in Texas in 2010 to Houston-based Prosperity Bancshares for an undisclosed amount. Each of the banks had one office each.

In October 2009, BB&T Corporation (now Truist) announced the pending sale of its Nevada banking operations to U.S. Bancorp for an undisclosed amount. BB&T had just acquired the 21 offices in Nevada through a transaction facilitated by the FDIC for disposal of the assets and deposits of the failed Alabama-based Colonial Bancgroup but BB&T had no desire to expand west of Texas while it wanted to keep the other Colonial former locations in the Southeastern United States. The acquisition was completed in January 2010.

In July 2010, U.S. Bancorp sold its FAF Advisors subsidiary to Nuveen Investments for $80 million (~$115 million in 2025) and a 9.5% stake in Nuveen.

In 2010, Huntington Bancshares announced it would take over the leases of bank branches inside Giant Eagle locations in Ohio, largely replacing U.S. Bancorp but also replacing branches from FirstMerit Corporation (which itself would be acquired by Huntington in 2016) and Citizens Financial Group; the deal didn't affect Citizens branches inside Giant Eagle locations in Pennsylvania. The deal mostly didn't affect U.S. Bancorp, but it did lead to the withdrawal from the Youngstown, Ohio market since U.S. Bancorp's only branches in the area were inside Giant Eagle locations; the branches had been a holdover from the Firstar days. By 2020, U.S. Bancorp had organically become Ohio's largest bank by deposits despite not having a presence in the Youngstown and Toledo markets and ahead of major banks based in Ohio (Huntington, Fifth Third Bank & KeyBank), PNC Bank, and Chase Bank.

In January 2011, U.S. Bancorp acquired the assets and deposits of the failed First Community Bank of New Mexico in a transaction facilitated by the FDIC for an asset discount of approximately $380 million (~$536 million in 2025). The acquisition had included 35 offices in New Mexico and 3 offices in Arizona. In January 2012, the company acquired the assets and deposits of the failed Knoxville, Tennessee-based BankEast in a transaction facilitated by the FDIC for an asset discount of approximately $67.5 million (~$93.4 million in 2025). The acquisition had included 10 offices in the Knoxville area. In March 2013, U.S. Bancorp announced that it was acquiring the $57 billion (~$77.6 billion in 2025) municipal bond trustee business from Deutsche Bank. In January 2014, U.S. Bancorp announced the pending acquisition of 94 branch offices of the Charter One Bank in Chicago from the RBS Citizens Financial Group for $315 million (~$421 million in 2025), doubling its market share in Chicago. 13 Charter One branches were closed due to their close proximity to existing U.S. Bank offices. The acquisition was completed in June 2014. In January 2015, chief financial officer Andrew Cecere was promoted to chief operating officer. A year later, Cecere was given the additional position of president.

In January 2017, U.S. Bancorp announced that chairman and CEO Richard Davis was going to hand over his CEO position to president and COO Andrew Cecere in April 2017 while remaining as chairman. Davis officially retired from the company in April 2018 and Cecere became chairman, president and CEO. In November 2017, the bank performed the United States banking industry's first real-time payment transaction using a system set up by The Clearing House. The transaction moved a nominal amount between accounts at BNY Mellon and U.S. Bancorp in three seconds, inaugurating the first new payment clearance and settlement system for the U.S. in over 40 years.

In February 2018, the bank was charged by the Department of Justice with failing to implement measures preventing illegal activities, including one case of abetting. U.S. Bancorp agreed to pay $613 million in fines and implement measures to improve the monitoring of its customer transactions. In September 2018, $505 million was distributed to customers of an illegal payday loan business, AMG Services, whose suspicious activities US Bancorp had failed to report. In September 2018, Fiserv announced that it would acquire MoneyPass from US Bancorp for $690 million (~$870 million in 2025). The deal was finalized in March 2019. The sale did not include Elan's credit card division, which issued some of the most prominent cards including Fidelity, BMW and Mercedes-Benz.

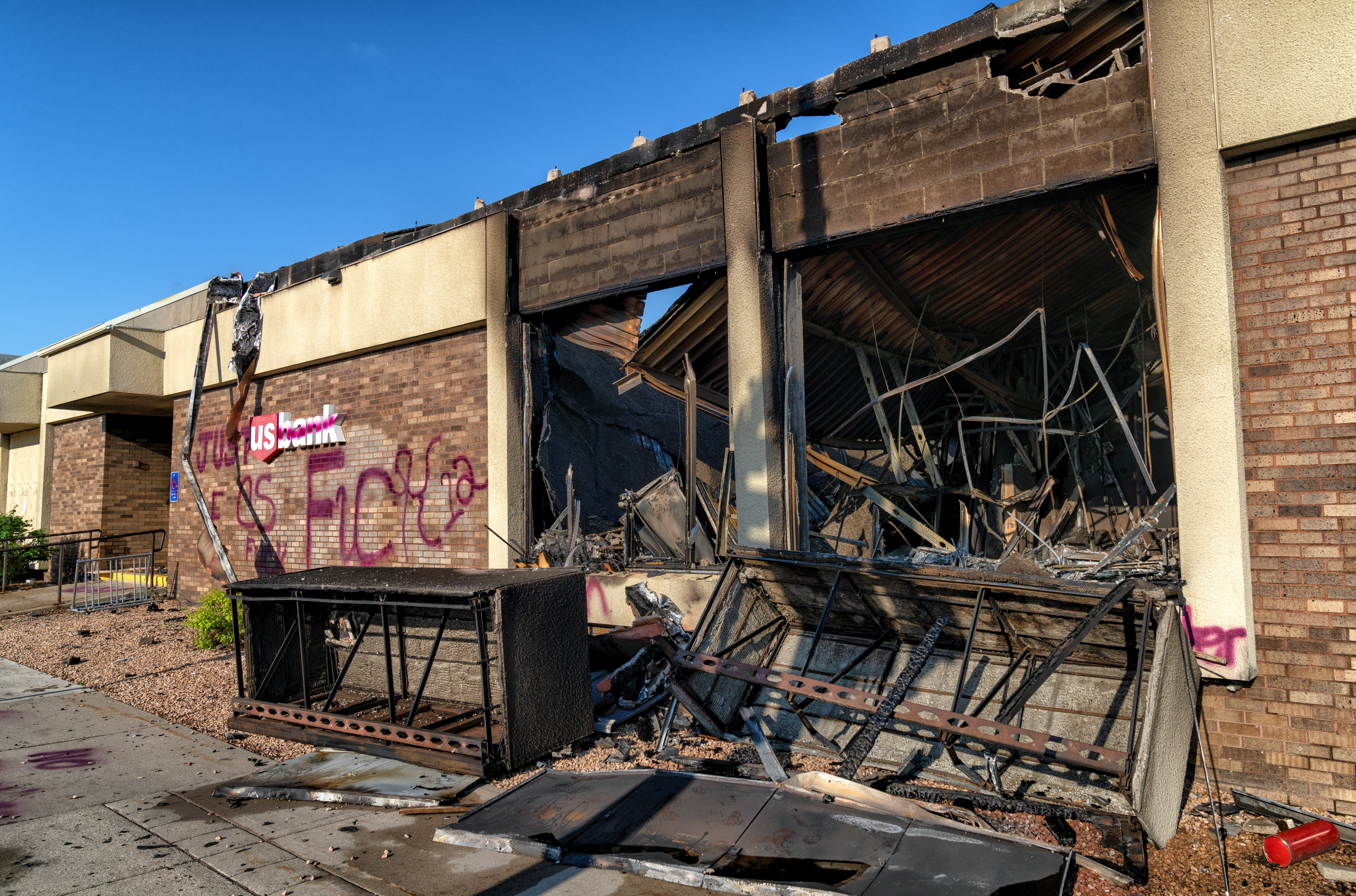
U.S. Bank building damaged by arson in Minneapolis, Minnesota

On September 21, 2021, U.S. Bancorp agreed to purchase MUFG Union Bank's consumer business for $8 billion (~$9.36 billion in 2025). It was the bank's biggest deal since 2001 when it merged with Milwaukee-based Firstar Corp. for $21 billion (~$36.4 billion in 2025). The deal with MUFG Union Bank added $58 billion in loans to U.S. Bancorp's current base of $294 billion and will give U.S. Bancorp a large presence on the U.S. West Coast, especially California. The combined bank was expected to have $723 billion in assets. U.S. regulatory approval for the merger was announced on October 16, 2022, and was completed as of December 1, 2022.

In August 2023, Mitsubishi UFJ Financial Group, former parent company of MUFG Union Bank it sold 8 months earlier to U.S. Bancorp, announced it would be buying a $936 million stake in U.S. Bancorp. The deal swaps debt with equity, strengthening U.S. Bancorp's alliance with Japan's largest bank.

=== 2025–present ===
Gunjan Kedia became president and chief executive officer in April 2025, succeeding Andrew Cecere. She succeeded Cecere as chairman of the board on April 21, 2026, following the company's annual meeting. Cecere retired from the board after more than 40 years in financial services.

U.S. Bancorp established a dedicated organization focused on digital assets and money movement in October 2025. Led by company executive Jamie Walker, the unit was tasked with developing services involving stablecoin issuance, cryptocurrency custody, asset tokenization, and digital payments.

In January 2026, U.S. Bancorp announced an agreement to acquire BTIG, a financial services firm specializing in investment banking, institutional sales and trading, research, and prime brokerage, for up to $1 billion. The acquisition was completed on June 1, 2026, with BTIG continuing to operate as a separate broker-dealer within U.S. Bancorp.

U.S. Bancorp announced in March 2026 that it would take over the Amazon small-business credit-card portfolio from American Express, with Mastercard serving as the payment network. The new Prime Business Card and Amazon Business Card, issued by U.S. Bank, launched in May 2026. Existing American Express cardholders were scheduled to receive replacement cards beginning August 14, 2026.

U.S. Bank completed a live pilot cross-border payment using USBDC, its proprietary U.S. dollar-backed stablecoin, between its North American and European entities in September 2026. The transaction was conducted on the Stellar blockchain and tested the token's minting, redemption, freezing, and clawback functions. The bank said it was exploring potential institutional applications including cross-border treasury operations and liquidity management.

== Notable Community Work ==
In May 2020, the U.S. Bancorp Center in downtown Minneapolis was damaged by rioting during the George Floyd protests in Minneapolis–Saint Paul. Two other bank branch locations on East Lake Street in Minneapolis were destroyed by arson. US Bancorp rebuilt the damaged branch location at 919 East Lake Street and donated the property at 2800 East Lake Street for redevelopment as an affordable housing project.

In May 2022, Bancorp announced a five-year community benefits plan, developed in coordination with the NCRC and the CRC as part of the planned acquisition of MUFG Union Bank. The $100 billion community plan is set over five years and is focusing on supporting equitable access to capital for low- and moderate-income communities and communities of color.

== Controversies ==
In December 2019, the bank dismissed Emily James, a Portland, Ore., call-center employee, and her supervisor, after James gave $20 (~$25.00 in 2025) of her own money to Marc Eugenio. On Christmas Eve, Eugenio ran out of gasoline and cash, and he was stranded at a gas station when his U.S. Bank debit card was rejected because funds he had deposited two days earlier had not yet been released into his account. After an unsuccessful attempt to release the funds, James met Eugenio at the gas station during her break and offered him $20 from her own pocket as a Christmas Eve act of kindness. She was fired from her job for violating company policy, but rehired after an investigation prompted by an article from Nicolas Kristof was published in The New York Times.

== Notable corporate buildings ==
- U.S. Bank Center in Phoenix, Arizona
- U.S. Bank Tower in Sacramento, California
- One California in San Francisco, California, sports the U.S. Bank logo and houses bank offices
- U.S. Bank Tower in Los Angeles, California, the third tallest building west of the Mississippi River
- U.S. Bank Tower in Denver, Colorado
- U.S. Bank Plaza in Boise, Idaho
- U.S. Bank Building in Chicago, Illinois
- U.S. Bank Building in Davenport, Iowa
- U.S. Bank Building in Duluth, Minnesota
- U.S. Bancorp Center in Minneapolis, Minnesota
- U.S. Bank Plaza in Minneapolis, Minnesota
- U.S. Bank Center in St. Paul, Minnesota
- One U.S. Bank Plaza in St. Louis, Missouri
- U.S. Bank Building in Billings, Montana
- U.S. Bank Tower in Lincoln, Nebraska
- U.S. Bank Center in Las Vegas, Nevada
- U.S. Bank Tower in Cincinnati, Ohio
- U.S. Bank Centre in Cleveland, Ohio
- U.S. Bancorp Tower in Portland, Oregon ("Big Pink")
- U.S. Bank Building in Sioux Falls, South Dakota
- U.S. Bank Center in Seattle, Washington
- U.S. Bank Building in Spokane, Washington
- U.S. Bank Building in La Crosse, Wisconsin
- U.S. Bank Center in Milwaukee, Wisconsin
- U.S. Bank Plaza in Madison, Wisconsin
- U.S. Bank Building in Sheboygan, Wisconsin

U.S. Bank owns corporate naming rights to U.S. Bank Stadium in Minneapolis, Minnesota.

== See also ==
- John F. Grundhofer
- Richard K. Davis
