= Minneapolis Thanksgiving Day fire =

1982 fire in downtown Minneapolis

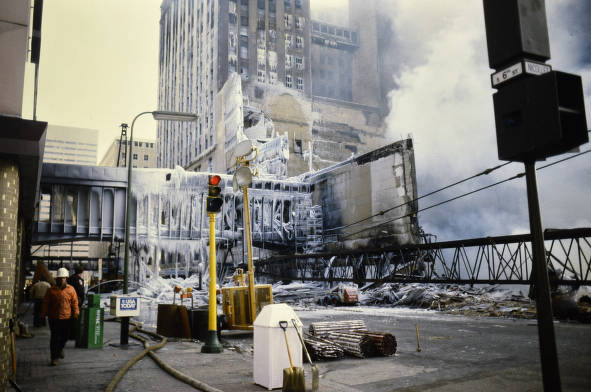
- Donaldson's (middleground) and Northwestern National Bank (background) following the fire
- Date: November 25, 1982; 43 years ago
- Duration: 12 hours (under control); Over 60 hours (fully extinguished)
- Location: Downtown Minneapolis, Minnesota; 44°58′37″N 93°16′15″W
- Type: Structure fire
- Cause: Arson
- Injuries: 10
- Property damage: $90 million - $100 million (estimated)
- Arrests: 2 minors

The Minneapolis Thanksgiving Day fire was a five-alarm fire that destroyed two buildings, covering an entire block of downtown Minneapolis, Minnesota, United States. It took place on November 25, 1982, and lasted into the following days. Affected were the 16-story headquarters of Northwestern National Bank (now Wells Fargo) and the vacant, partially demolished Donaldson's department store, which had previously moved across the street. Nobody was killed as a result of the fire, though 10 firefighters were treated at hospitals for minor smoke inhalation.

== Buildings ==
=== Northwestern National Bank Building ===
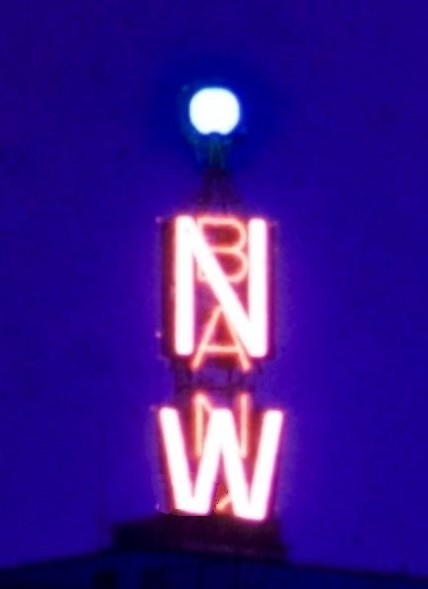
The weatherball in 1980.

The Northwestern National Bank Building was a 16-story, 264-foot (80 m) tall art deco building constructed in 1930 by the architecture firm of Graham, Anderson, Probst & White at the cost of $6 million. It had 115 teller stations. In 1962, it and the Northstar Center were the first buildings to be connected to the downtown skyway system.

By far the most famous feature of the building was the 78 ton weatherball installed atop it in 1949. It began its forecasts on October 7th of that year. The supporting structure, which displayed the bank's initials (NW) and the word "bank", contained more than 1.25 miles of neon tubing. Every day, a bank employee called the United States Weather Bureau for the next day's forecast, and the color of the ball would be updated accordingly, shining between 4:15 pm and 1 am. It was easily visible throughout the metro area, and at the time of installation, only the Foshay Tower stood taller within the city's skyline. Red indicated warm weather, white indicated cold weather, green indicated no weather changes, and blinking colors signaled precipitation.

Other tenants in the building included the Banco Mortgage Company; the Faegre & Benson law firm; and the Northwest Bancorporation, Northwestern National Bank's holding company.

=== Donaldson's ===
Located along Nicollet Mall, the 5-story, glass-paneled Donaldson's department store was constructed in 1888, replacing a previous location on the same site. As the store expanded through the decades, a connecting 8-story structure was built at the cost of $2 million and opened in 1924. A dome that stood on top of the 5-story building was moved to this new section, where it remained until 1942, when it was deconstructed for resources during World War II. In 1977, it was announced that the store would relocate across the street to the planned City Center development. The new location opened in September of 1982 and demolition work soon began on the old building.

== Fire ==
On Thanksgiving day, November 25, 1982, shortly after 5pm, an explosion occurred on the upper floors of the partially demolished Donaldson's store. The fire quickly grew out of control and burst through windows, allowing it to spread to the fifth story of the next-door Northwestern National Bank Building, where it then traveled through the upper floors. The bank building lacked sprinklers, as they were not yet required by law. 130+ firefighters worked for over 12 hours to keep the blaze contained, at one point needing to pull out of the building due to concerns that the floors would collapse. Flames rose 80-100 feet high and could be seen for miles. Additionally, window weights began falling down and hitting the street below, which Fire Chief John Freutel - then a rookie - described as "two-pound bombs".

Firefighters feared that the flames would spread beyond the block to other structures and potentially threaten the entirety of downtown Minneapolis, so they hosed down the roofs of nearby buildings. A fire briefly started on top of the Northern States Power building, but this was promptly extinguished. Assistant Fire Chief Tom Dickinson devised a plan to implode the nearby flagship Dayton's department store to act as a firebreak if the wind continued blowing, but the breeze stayed low enough that this did not need to be carried out. Smoke did reach neighboring structures through the skyways however, such as a J.C. Penney store and the IDS Center, which filled the latter's Crystal Court and caused several windows within both buildings to break; guests at the IDS's adjoining Marquette Hotel were evacuated.

The fire was ultimately contained the next day, and completely put out by the following Monday. While ten firefighters were treated for minor smoke inhalation, there were no fatalities.

== Cause ==
The Minneapolis Fire Department quickly determined the cause of the fire as arson. According to authorities, two juveniles, aged 12 and 13, were on their way home from a movie when they decided to explore the vacant Donaldson's building. Due to laxer codes at the time revolving around safety at demolition sites, security were not present 24 hours a day, so the two were able to gain access undetected. They crawled through a snow fence and broke down a plywood door, then proceeded to start a fire with matches and a butane torch they found. The charges were eventually dropped.

== Aftermath ==
=== Damage ===
Damages were estimated at $90–100 million, a jaw-dropping amount as it was about the same as the total of all fire damages in the city from the previous 15 to 20 years. Property loss-wise, the fire was the second largest in the United States in 1982. While the upper twelve floors of the bank building were gutted, the lower four mostly remained untouched. As a result, the bank's vault and safety deposit boxes were not damaged. In addition, one of Charles Lindbergh's first planes, which was hanging on display in the lobby - having been installed only the previous Monday - survived intact. The bank's computerized records were also unaffected, as these were kept in an operations center several blocks away; this too was the case for the building's other tenants, which had similar setups.

=== Weatherball ===
The weatherball also survived, though damaged and inoperable. The bank opted to donate it to the Minnesota State Fair, where plans were made to restore it and put it on display. The ball and its supporting structure, the latter of which had been dismantled during its removal from the bank, were stored in an older, unused building on the fairgrounds. A full repair effort was deemed to be very expensive and no corporate sponsors stepped up to fund it.

Additionally, in regards to actually putting it back together, it was found to be difficult, with fair manager Jerry Hammer stating, "it didn't come with any instructions. There were hundreds of pieces of metal, some of them all bent to hell. It wasn't taken down with A-1 care and documentation. It was like a blown-up building. Just a heap of metal. And the ball itself wasn't in great shape, either."

As a result of both of these problems, it was never restored. When the building it sat in was set to be torn down in 2000, the weatherball was scrapped.

In 2013, WCCO-TV erected a modern take on Northwestern's weatherball on their downtown Minneapolis building, called the Weather Watcher.

=== The site ===
The damaged bank building was demolished in March 1984 and a 57-story César Pelli-designed art deco building called the Norwest Center (now Wells Fargo Center) was built in its place, opening in 1988. The Donaldson's half of the block is occupied by Gaviidae Common, an upscale shopping mall and office complex built in 1989.
