= Northstar Center (Minneapolis, Minnesota) =

- U.S. National Register of Historic Places
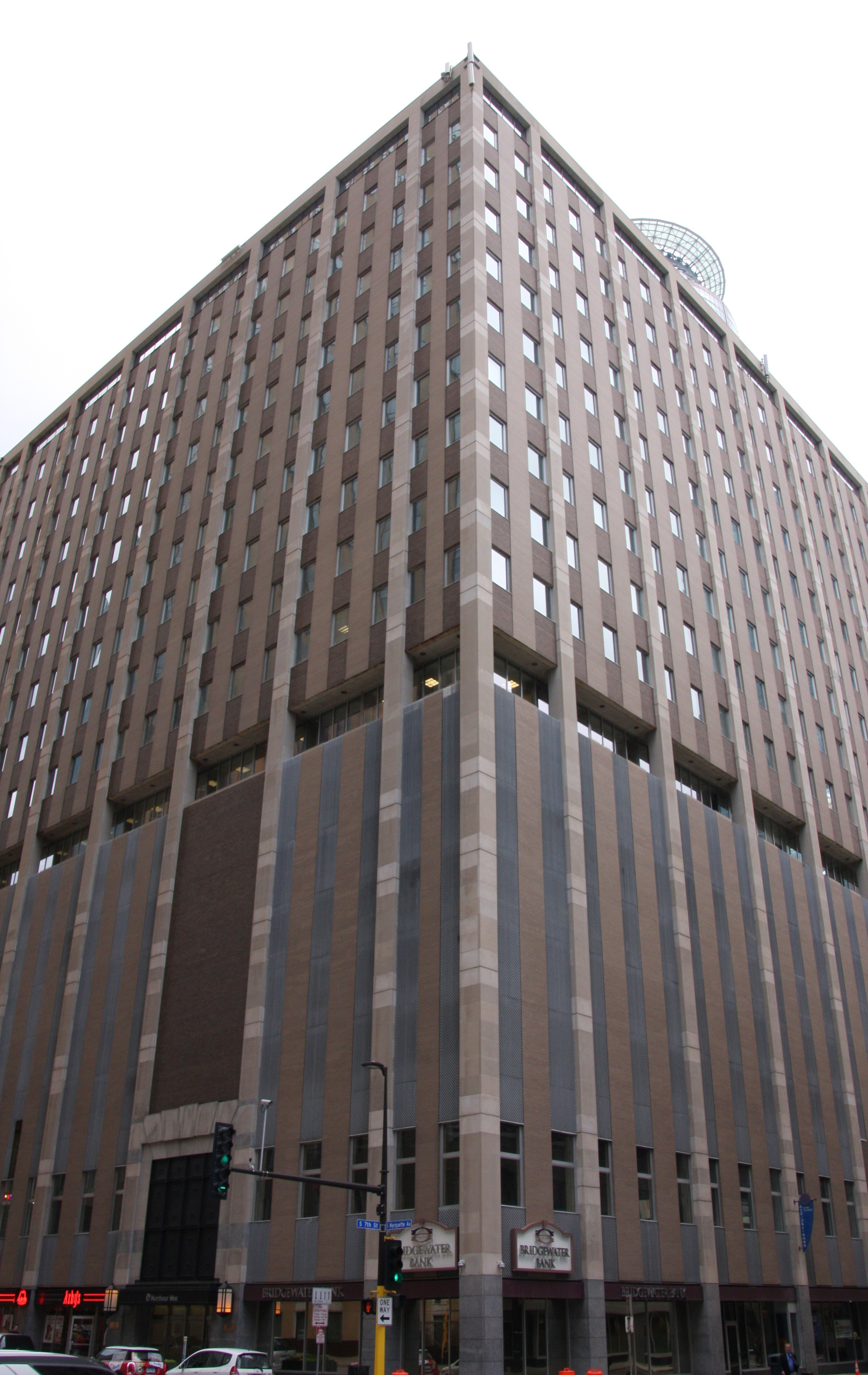

- Location within Minnesota Location within the United States
- Location: 625 Marquette Avenue and 608,618, and 618 1/2 Second Avenue South, Minneapolis, MN
- Coordinates: 44.97651°N 93.26970°W
- Area: 2.16 acres (0.87 ha)
- Built by: Naugle-Leck
- Architect: Edward Baker and Associates
- Architectural style: Corporate modernism
- NRHP reference No.: 16000441

Northstar Center is an office building and hotel complex in downtown Minneapolis, Minnesota developed in the early 1960s. It opened in 1963 as the first mixed-use development in Minneapolis that offered office, retail, entertainment, and hotel functions. It consisted of three separate buildings: the Cargill Building, Northstar Inn, and the Pillsbury Company Building. The complex was listed on the National Register of Historic Places in 2016 for its significance in community planning and development.

Northstar Center occupies most of the city block bounded by South Sixth Street, Second Avenue South, South Seventh Street, and Marquette Avenue. The exception is a low-rise building on the northwest corner built as a bank and opened in 1949. The oldest part of the complex is the Pillsbury Building, which is thirteen stories high, built of reinforced concrete, and clad in stone. The Pillsbury Building was substantially modified in the 1960s to include it in Northstar Center, receiving additions to the seventh through thirteenth floors above the parking ramp. The 1960s development included a hotel on the southeast corner, historically known as the Northstar Inn and now part of the Hotel Indigo chain; the Cargill Building on the southwest corner; and a parking ramp occupying the second through sixth floors. The first floor of the hotel includes retail space and the hotel lobby, while the first floor and part of the second floor of the Cargill Building house commercial retail spaces. Above the parking garage, the seventh floor (shared between the Cargill Building and the hotel) houses offices and banquet rooms, and then the Cargill Building houses corporate tenants on the eighth through 17th floors.

The building is also notable for its skyways connecting it to neighboring buildings. The skyway crossing Seventh Street to Baker Center is the oldest surviving skyway in the system, while another skyway crossed Marquette Avenue to the Northwestern National Bank Building. That skyway was burned in the Minneapolis Thanksgiving Day fire in 1982, and when the new Norwest Center was built, the replacement skyway was connected to the former Midwest Federal Savings and Loan building instead of the Cargill Building. A later skyway connected Northstar Center to Capella Tower.

Walkin' Dog was located in Northstar Center.
