= Minneapolis City Center =

- City Center's southeastern corner in March 2023
- Location: Minneapolis, Minnesota, United States
- Coordinates: 44°58′41″N 93°16′22″W
- Address: 33 6th Street South and 40 7th Street South
- Opened: August 10, 1983
- Developer: BCE Development Properties Inc.
- Manager: Ryan Companies
- Architect: Skidmore, Owings & Merrill
- Num. of stores: approx. 40
- Num. of anchor tenants: 4
- Floor area: 456,878 square feet (42,000 m^{2})
- Floors: 3 (with basement)
- Parking: 7-story parking ramp with 687 spaces
- Website: www.33southsixthcitycenter.com

Minneapolis City Center (or simply City Center) is an indoor shopping mall located in Downtown West, Minneapolis between Hennepin Avenue and Nicollet Mall, and 6th and 7th Streets. The three-story retail atrium adjoins the 33 South Sixth office skyscraper, Minneapolis Marriott City Center hotel, and a seven-story parking garage. The complex also contains six connections to the Minneapolis Skyway System, the most of any city building. City Center was first announced in 1975, with a search for developers beginning that August, and demolition of the site's previous structures beginning in 1979. The mall opened in August 1983, and was preceded by the grand opening of Donaldson's new flagship department store, inside the center, approximately one year prior. Overall, City Center contains 456,878 square feet (42,000 m^{2}) of leasable retail and office space.

City Center was designed by Skidmore, Owings & Merrill and features elements of both modern and brutalist architecture. The exterior facade, in particular, received criticism for its gray, drab design. A series of renovations to the mall have occurred, with the first one being in 1993, which redistributed tenant spaces within the former Donaldson's store and improved the overall walkability. Later projects further adjusted the layout of the mall several times. Many stores have leased space at City Center throughout the years, including Allen Edmonds, Bath & Body Works, Brooks Brothers, Sam Goody, and Victoria's Secret.

Following the 2004 renovation which converted its third floor into office space, and removed its food court entirely, the remaining retail space maintained occupancy rates between 60-70 percent annually. The mall was last anchored by Saks Off 5th and Marshalls, which closed in 2021 and 2023, respectively. Other former anchors include Carson Pirie Scott, Donaldson's, Filene's Basement, Montgomery Ward, Office Depot, and Sports Authority. The center currently features few retailers and several restaurants, including Cardigan Donuts, Fogo de Chão, Leeann Chin, Tom's Watch Bar, and the UPS Store.

== Site ==
City Center was constructed within an oversized city block in downtown Minneapolis, between Hennepin Avenue and Nicollet Mall, and 6th and 7th Streets. The site had a history of housing retail and hospitality operations, previously serving the Hotel Dyckman since 1910, an upscale French restaurant named Chateau de Paris, the Minneapolis Merchandise Mart, and numerous other shops. The project was formally announced in January 1975 as City Center '75, one of several proposals for new construction in Minneapolis. City Center was the largest building proposed at the time, and was billed as an attempt to stabilize and maintain economic redevelopment in the city's downtown core. Specifically, Minneapolis hoped to welcome two new department stores, construct two office towers, and expand the adjacent Radisson Hotel across the street. Approximately US$145 million was set aside for the redevelopment, with $38 million coming from city assistance in order to obtain property rights for the city block. Critics felt the project was risky for city taxpayers, given the development's projected costs. Nearly $3 million was used for relocation efforts, as a total of 69 existing businesses were removed from the site prior to construction.

The Forum Cafeteria, another structure within the block, unrelatedly closed its doors during construction negotiations in August 1975, citing declining sales; during a period of setbacks for the City Center project, Minneapolis Tribune editor Charles W. Bailey questioned if another restaurant would attempt to open in its place, given the historic nature of the space, before further decisions were made regarding the development's construction. Ultimately, a nightclub named Scottie's on Seventh opened in its space before deconstruction. Some locals questioned whether or not the downtown Nankin Cafe would be demolished for City Center; this was ultimately decided in March 1980 when project officials announced a new location would be a part of the mall, separated from a new location for Scottie's on Seventh by the parking garage.

Barbara Flanagan from the Minneapolis Tribune opined that City Center would flourish if its designers preserved the best historic features of the site, suggesting that similar decisions made in downtown Saint Paul prevented economic success. When plans for City Center were approved by city officials, Hotel Dyckman was the state's first structure set to be demolished by implosion, which occurred on November 19, 1979. The Merchandise Mart was set to be the only structure saved to make way for City Center, and was considered a holdout in 1978, possibly due to its existing skyway connection to the Radisson Hotel. Others felt the Merchandise Mart, which was built in the 1960s, was too new of a structure to be demolished. Flanagan questioned why more was not done to save the Forum Cafeteria structure instead.

== Architecture and layout ==
In August 1975, scouting for the project began, with a group of ten Minneapolis council representatives visiting several North American cities to gather potential developers, ultimately choosing three. Precedent structures developed by the three groups were Pennzoil Place in Houston, Tower Place in Atlanta, and Edmonton Centre in Edmonton. Prior to the winning project proposal, an iteration made in 1973 suggested two octagonal office towers suspended on stilts, directly adjacent to a retail center, a new structure to house Donaldson's, and a significantly larger parking garage facing Hennepin. The developed plan encompassed 800,000 square feet (74,000 m^{2}) and featured designs on an additional city block between Nicollet Mall and Marquette Avenue, and 6th and 7th Streets, which was ultimately reserved for the construction of Gaviidae Common and Wells Fargo Center. Oxford Development Properties was chosen as the developer for City Center, which transitioned to BCE Development Properties Inc. during its construction.

=== Exterior ===
City Center's corner at 7th Street and Nicollet Mall in 2018 prior to a facade renovation.

Minneapolis City Center features elements of modern and brutalist architecture. According to MinnPost's Nick Magrino, the center's brutalist exterior appearance is similar to that of the nearby Riverside Plaza apartment complex. Its facade has received criticism over the years, with Neal St. Anthony from Star Tribune noting how locals once referred to the structure as "the Alamo" due to its gray exterior. Linda Mack wrote in a 1993 article, in the same publication, covering the mall's first renovation, which she considered an improvement: "When City Center opened in 1983, it made an architectural thud so loud it reverberated for years. Its gray precast concrete shell and lifeless interior [...] disappointed Minneapolitans." Adding, Nelson said City Center along with its sibling structure Town Square were among Skidmore, Owings and Merrill's low points in architectural design. David Sternberg, president of Brookfield Properties, once admitted that while the property is not particularly attractive from the exterior, it is "premier space" in Minneapolis.

The City Center complex also serves as a major hub for the Minneapolis Skyway System, providing six connections, the most of any Minneapolis building. It connects to 50 South Sixth, the Dayton's flagship store, Gaviidae Common, Mayo Clinic Square, the Plymouth Building, and PwC Plaza. A staircase spanning the street to the skyway connecting City Center to Gaviidae Common, in addition to an identical one located one block south, was proposed in 2014 by American landscape architect James Corner, who the city chose to assist in redesigning Nicollet Mall. Janet Moore from Star Tribune wrote how the success of City Center's design depends on its surroundings, particularly its western side facing Hennepin Avenue, noting that the mall was busier when Carson Pirie Scott was an anchor and the adjacent Block E property served more of a purpose.

In June 2018, an unidentified foreign buyer purchased City Center and the adjoining 33 South Sixth skyscraper for US$320 million, establishing a record-breaking sale for office-designated buildings in Minnesota. Minneapolis-based Ryan Companies serves as the new manager of the retail complex according to city documents, and upon the news, they announced plans to renovate the mall in order to provide better circulation towards Nicollet Mall. On August 1, 2019, the US$3 million renovation began on the mall's eastern facade, beginning with the removal process of several precast concrete panels. One of the new corner entrances to the building, reopened in September 2020, amidst the COVID-19 pandemic. The refurbished entrance was described as "definitely an upgrade" to City Center by Star Tribune's Neal St. Anthony. The same project, however, was described as "a desperate move [...] to slow the decline of the retail population at City Center, which has been on a very steady decline", according to Brian Lipson, the Principal at the management company that owns the nearby Andrus property.

=== Interior ===
City Center contains about 456,878 square feet (42,000 m^{2}) of leasable retail space spread across four floors. Accessible via a set of escalators in the third floor food court was an upper level mezzanine with two additional retail spaces. Via a set of elevators near Hennepin Avenue is a seven-story parking garage with 687 spaces for employees of the building and the adjacent 33 South Sixth. Bill Cannan Design, with Oxford Properties, fronted the graphic design efforts for the mall, producing backlit signs, displays, promotional items, and directories.

The interior circulation and layout of City Center have changed many times following its several renovations. In 1989, due to feedback collected from shoppers of the mall, a new set of escalators was installed connecting the second floor back hallway to its third floor food court. Pedestrian traffic prior to the installation tended to head through the Carson Pirie Scott department store, instead of the secondary corridor. Brookfield Development said the addition was to improve circulation through the skyways connecting the Radisson Hotel and Plymouth Building to the structure, as the food court was placed on third floor to direct circulation towards it. City Center's first interior renovation occurred in 1993, and was performed by the city's architectural firms Alliance Architects and Shea Design. The project improved the mall's window visibility towards Nicollet Mall, and added banners, lighting and awnings to tenant storefronts and at the third floor food court entrances. The redesign opened up the southern half of the former Carson Pirie Scott, and added an atrium that allowed Montgomery Ward customers to look below into Filene's Basement. Other parts of the former Carson Pirie Scott store were transformed into smaller retail spaces along two new corridors. Mack found these changes to improve the mall's walkability. In 2003, Sternberg announced that the group would renovate City Center, and convert the remaining third floor retail space into office tenants. Existing retail tenants were consolidated to the mall's first two floors, and the food court stalls were removed.

=== Scottie's on Seventh space ===
When City Center opened in 1983, the approximate location of the city's former Forum Cafeteria was reserved to house its then-leased restaurant and nightclub, Scottie's on Seventh. In its original location, the restaurant sought to prevent redevelopment of its site and registered the structure with the National Register of Historic Places in 1976. The Minneapolis Tribune was in favor of the reconstruction of its Art Deco elements inside City Center, arguing that "they would help link the newness of City Center with past and present downtown traditions". During construction, the developers were ultimately required to preserve its Art Deco interior, disassembling and then reassembling the materials inside City Center. As one of the only examples of the architectural style in Minnesota, it garnered a fan base of preservationists. The agreement was reached as the result of two lawsuits brought on by Scottie's on Seventh against Oxford Properties. The new space is located approximately 100 feet away from its original spot. Among the restaurant's notable decor includes panels of etched mirrors, black onyx tiles, cast metal trim, and a large ovular bar. When the space transitioned to Mick's Restaurant in 1996, the bar was removed in favor of a smaller one, and the existing furniture was reupholstered in black, blue, and green fabrics.

The site has had a history of unsuccessful restaurant ventures, with Jim Fuller from the Star Tribune calling the tenant space a graveyard. Following the closure of the revival of Scottie's on Seventh, it became Paramount Café in 1987, which operated under two management companies, and then sat vacant from 1989 until 1992.

== History ==
=== 1980s ===
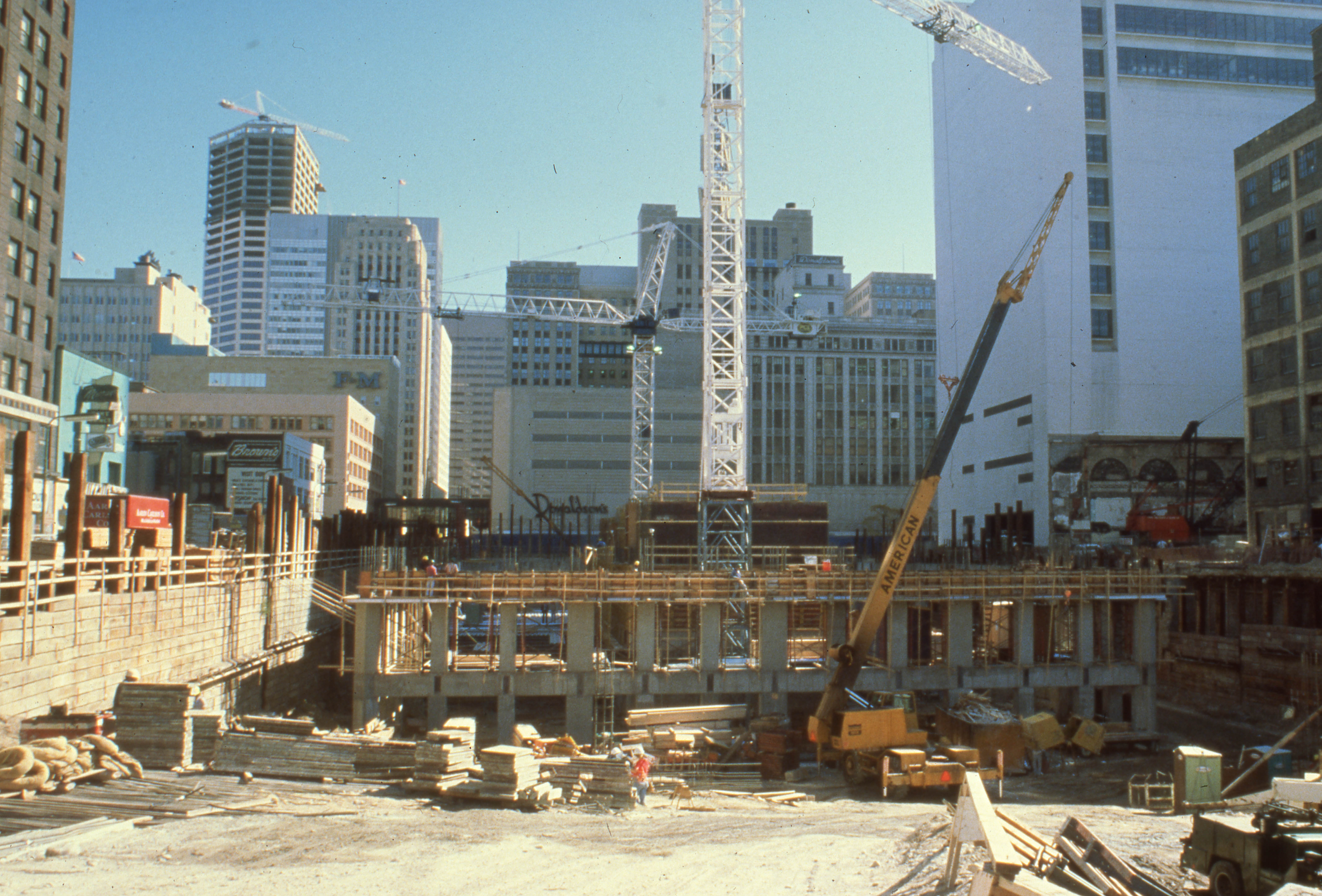
City Center beginning construction in the early 1980s. The construction of nearby U.S. Bank Plaza is shown in the background.

Several storefronts opened at the mall in the months following its grand opening, including Aladdin's Castle, JoAnn Fabrics, Laura Ashley, McDonald's, and Things Remembered. By 1986, the average retail tenant at City Center made US$120-140 per square foot.

Victoria's Secret opened one of their largest stores at the time on the skyway level, on July 30, 1986. The 1,200 square feet (110 m^{2}) storefront was located directly below one of its competitors, an Underworld Limited outlet, and featured upgraded fixtures and decor, including marble flooring, pink and cream-accented walls, and scented air. In 1987, representatives from the mall worked with city officials to encourage the demolishment of city buildings located across Hennepin Avenue, in a city block referred to as Block E, where crime rates were experiencing an increase annually. That same year, Donaldson's was rebranded as Carson Pirie Scott, following the completion of a merger that made the former brand defunct.

=== 1990s ===
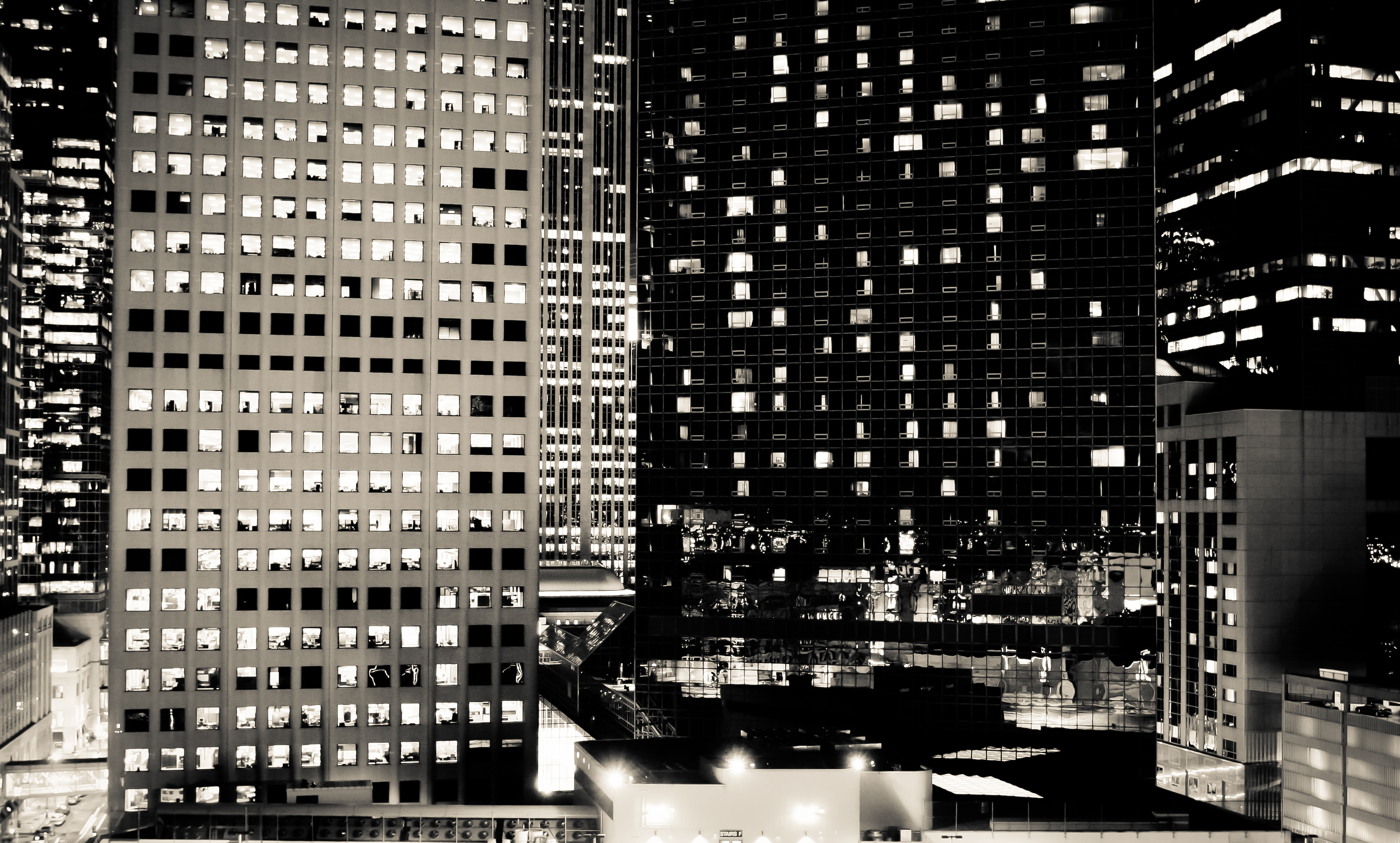
City Center bridges the gap between the 33 South Sixth office skyscraper (left) and the Minneapolis Marriott City Center Hotel (right).

In 1992, Filene's Basement revealed intent to design a flagship store in the City Center's lower level leased by Carson Pirie Scott, which was scheduled to close on January 30, 1993, and housed their offices and furniture department. A spokesperson for the company said the store was to specialize in men's suits and women's wear, in order to compete with Dayton's and the department stores at Gaviidae Common. The following year, Montgomery Ward leased a three-story location that formerly served as the northern half of Carson Pirie Scott. JCPenney had considered the space, but found it too large for their desired store format. The southern half of the former Carson Pirie Scott store was divided into smaller retail spaces, that housed new tenants such as Bath & Body Works, Cacique Lingerie, Express, and a TCF Bank location. The retailers would debut on September 22, 1993, and Brookfield Properties used the date to celebrate the mall's 10-year anniversary. Sam Goody opened that same day, returning to downtown Minneapolis in a 12,225-square-foot (1,100 m^{2}) space in City Center, after formerly having a storefront at the Conservatory two blocks south. The new store acted as a prototype design for the brand, offering a unique video wall to display media to customers. The success of the store resulted in the closure of the company brand's Musicland store nearby. On May 4, 1995, the Filene's Basement store was converted into Marshalls, a Massachusetts-based discount retailer, while other stores in the Minneapolis area were converted to Linens 'n Things locations. The company said their stores generally underperformed in Minnesota, minus their location at the Mall of America in Bloomington.

In May 1999, the Minnesota Law Center converted the third floor of the former Montgomery Ward store into its new office space, and Office Depot announced plans to occupy half (approximately 25,000 square feet (2,300 m^{2})) of the accompanying street level space. The following month, Limited Brands pulled out of 5 of their 6 retailers at City Center, announcing the closure of their Bath & Body Works, Express, the Limited, Structure, and Victoria's Secret stores, due to City Center operating without an anchor store for an extended period of time, which their lease agreements permitted. The company's Lane Bryant store remained open due to different contractual terms. Also in 1999, the state's first two Jamba Juice outlets opened in City Center, with a restaurant-style location on the first floor and a kiosk on the second.

=== 2000s ===
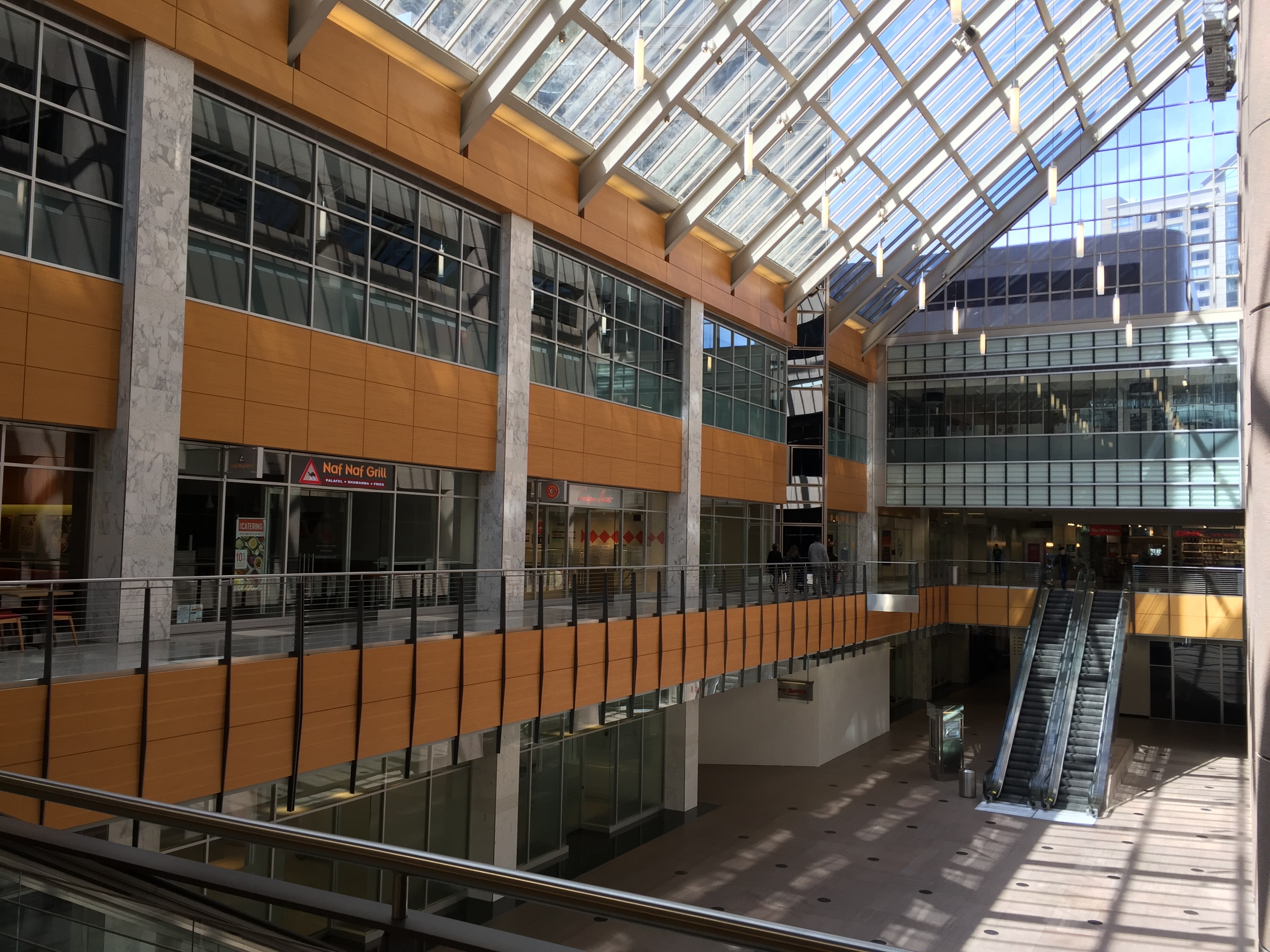
The center atrium of City Center, which houses several restaurants like Cardigan Donuts, Leeann Chin, and Naf Naf Grill.

Despite the nearby openings of a Target department store and the construction of the new GameWorks-anchored Block E development across Hennepin Avenue, City Center began to experience decreasing occupancy, entering the new decade with a vacancy rate of over 20 percent and approximately 90 retail tenants. The first new lease in 2000 was for a Copeland's restaurant to occupy the former Nankin Cafe spot. Harold Brandt, former Brookfield Properties president, said they struggled to secure new retailers for the mall until Block E officially opened. A 2001 Star Tribune article by John Ewoldt acknowledged that City Center had been losing retailers consistently. In August 2003, to address this issue, the renovation announcement was made. The mall was then at a 75 percent occupancy rate and had also failed attracting a grocery store to the one of the empty anchor spaces along Nicollet Mall, which was one of Brookfield's goals for the property. Additionally, Target purchased approximately 75,000 square feet (7,000 m^{2}) of the newly converted retail space, transforming it into office space. To promote the construction of the nearby Minneapolis Central Library, Hennepin County Library occupied a vacant storefront in 2004 that offered free poetry readings. Other stores that occupied spaces at City Center during the 2000s included the Body Shop, Champs Sports, Hallmark Cards, Radio Shack, and the city's information center. New restaurants at the mall included Au Bon Pain, Fogo de Chão, and Leeann Chin.

Nordstrom considered City Center and Gaviidae Common in 2006 as potential sites for their second Minnesota department store, and the company's discount brand Nordstrom Rack was rumored to have considered a space as well. Best Buy also toured vacant anchor spots inside the mall, but all three stores ultimately decided not to open locations. In 2009, Brookfield announced intent to sell City Center and the adjoining 33 South Sixth, exiting themselves from the downtown Minneapolis real estate market completely. By the year-end, the properties were listed as "discontinued operations" by Brookfield.

=== 2010s ===
The former Saks Off 5th store, which anchored City Center from 2016 to 2021.

San Francisco-based Shorenstein Properties purchased City Center in 2012, after not having a presence in the Minneapolis market for several years. The following year, the mall's Len Druskin Outlet store received an award for Best Fashion Clearance Room, as part of the annual Best of Minnesota awards by Star Tribune. In January 2015, Saks Off 5th announced plans to relocate their Minneapolis location, from the neighboring Gaviidae Common to City Center, expanding from a 27,000-square-foot (2,500 m^{2}) store to a 40,000-square-foot (3,700 m^{2}) one. The new location opened on April 21, 2016, in the two-story space formerly occupied by Office Depot. Several months prior, Sports Authority also announced plans to lease an anchor store at City Center in the corner facing Nicollet Mall and 7th Street. Nordstrom Rack had interest in the space, but lost the leasing agreement to Sports Authority, ultimately opening down the street inside IDS Center's Crystal Court. After Sports Authority filed for Chapter 11 bankruptcy in 2016, the company then closed their City Center store. The space was later used during the Super Bowl LII as a temporary office and information space for National Football League employees and volunteers.

Several restaurants leased space at City Center throughout the 2010s. Cardigan Donuts opened their flagship location on May 11, 2017, in a 2,600 square feet (240 m^{2}) space on the second floor. It is the highest-rated doughnut shop in Minneapolis, according to Yelp. Leeann Chin relocated to a different corridor within the mall, and Minneapolis-based Mexican restaurant Los Ocampos debuted an express version of their chain in 2018. Union 73, a boutique owned by Marcus Lemonis, began a closing sale in 2019 after occupying a 7,000 square feet (650 m^{2}) space; the store was formerly Len Druskin's main City Center location, that received a buyout from Lemonis in 2017.

=== 2020s ===
The former Marshalls department store operated for nearly 28 years at City Center, pictured 3 days before its closure in January 2023.

Several storefronts closed following the effects of the COVID-19 pandemic. The mall's manager, Jim Durda, said that operating during the pandemic was difficult but thought things were getting better with every week. Both Allen Edmonds and Brooks Brothers shuttered their City Center locations in 2020 and 2021, respectively. The latter store had previously closed their City Center store in 2020 and reopened across the hall that same year, before deciding to close altogether. However, two restaurants, Bad Axe Throwing and Tom's Watch Bar, signed new leases to take over the mall's corner at Hennepin Avenue and 6th Street. Bell Bank and Chase Bank also opened new storefronts, both offering bank telling and financial services. This increased the mall's occupancy rate to 62 percent.

Saks Off 5th departed its anchor location in April 2021 with little notice. In December 2022, Marshalls announced it would close its City Center location by January 14, 2023, after operating for nearly 28 years. Brianna Kelly from the Minneapolis/St. Paul Business Journal noted how the closure left Nicollet Mall's Target as the only remaining department store in downtown Minneapolis. She also noted that City Center had previously found success using its retail spaces for dining and entertainment concepts. To address the closures of several prominent downtown retailers and decreasing occupancy rates of skyway level tenants, including within City Center, Minneapolis mayor Jacob Frey established a task force named the Vibrant Downtown Storefronts Workgroup.

== Incidents ==
A number of incidents have occurred at City Center throughout the years. Several took place at the mall's Nankin Cafe restaurant. Following the incident, City Center management said the tenant owed US$330,000 in back rent, which Woo disputed and found the claim's timing to be suspicious. Additionally, Nankin Cafe was briefly closed between January and May 1989 due to an employee strike.

On July 15, 2018, a customer inside of the Marshalls store deliberately set a clothing rack on fire, causing US$500,000 worth of damage to merchandise. A looting incident occurred in August 2020, as a result of the 2020 Minneapolis false rumors riot. City Center was one of several buildings vandalized, with a total of three broken windows to the Saks Off 5th and Starbucks stores. The mall reopened the following day.

== See also ==
- 33 South Sixth
- List of shopping malls in Minnesota
- Minneapolis Marriott City Center Hotel
