= Gaviidae Common =

Mixed-use in Minneapolis, Minnesota, U.S.

- Interior view of Gaviidae Common I (April 2018)
- Location: Minneapolis, Minnesota, U.S.
- Coordinates: 44°58′38″N 93°16′17″W
- Address: 500–700 Nicollet Mall
- Opened: 1989; 37 years ago
- Developer: Brookfield Development Inc.
- Owner: Common I: Nightingale Properties (first and second floors); Greater Twin Cities YMCA (fifth floor, parts of third and fourth floors); United Properties (parts of third and fourth floors); Gaviidae Commons LLC (parking garage); Common II: KBS Companies
- Architect: César Pelli; Lohan Associates
- Num. of anchor tenants: 2
- Floor area: 443,000 square feet (41,000 m^{2})
- Floors: 5
- Public transit: Metro Transit; Blue Green; At Nicollet Mall

Gaviidae Common is a mixed-use development on Nicollet Mall in Minneapolis, Minnesota, United States. The first phase of the mall, Gaviidae Common I, opened in 1989 and is adjoined to Gaviidae Common II by a series of skyways. Phase II opened in 1991. A joint venture designed by Argentine American architect César Pelli and Chicago-based Lohan Associates, the mall occupies 443,000-square-foot (41,000 m^{2}) of retail and office space spread across five floors. Following the closure of the mall's food court and several tenants in 2013, the top three floors of Gaviidae Common II were converted into office and recreational space for the adjoining RBC Plaza.

The mall houses the state's largest barrel-vaulted ceiling and contains loon-inspired artwork designed by Deborah Sussman and Paul Prejza. Loons belong to the family Gaviidae, hence the shopping center's namesake. Gaviidae Common is anchored by Walgreens and YMCA, both of which were added to the mall's lineup of stores after an extensive renovation of the shopping center. Saks Fifth Avenue, the mall's original anchor tenant, converted into a discount store in 2005, before closing in 2015. Neiman Marcus opened along with phase II in 1991 but closed in 2013.

== History ==
The first phase of Gaviidae Common opened in 1989 occupying the 5th to 7th Street blocks of Minneapolis' Nicollet Mall. It was developed by Brookfield Properties, which managed Gaviidae Common from its opening in 1989 until September 2013. Saks Fifth Avenue was the mall's sole anchor at the time of opening. Gaviidae Common II, containing a Neiman Marcus department store, occupied the first four floors and basement of the RBC Plaza office complex and features an underground parking garage with 700 spaces. The first two levels of Gaviidae Common (referred to as Street Level and Skyway Level) contain the majority of the mall's leasable space, with approximately 349,756-square-foot (32,000 m^{2}) of retail space. In total, the center contains 443,000-square-foot (41,000 m^{2}) of leasable space over its two blocks.

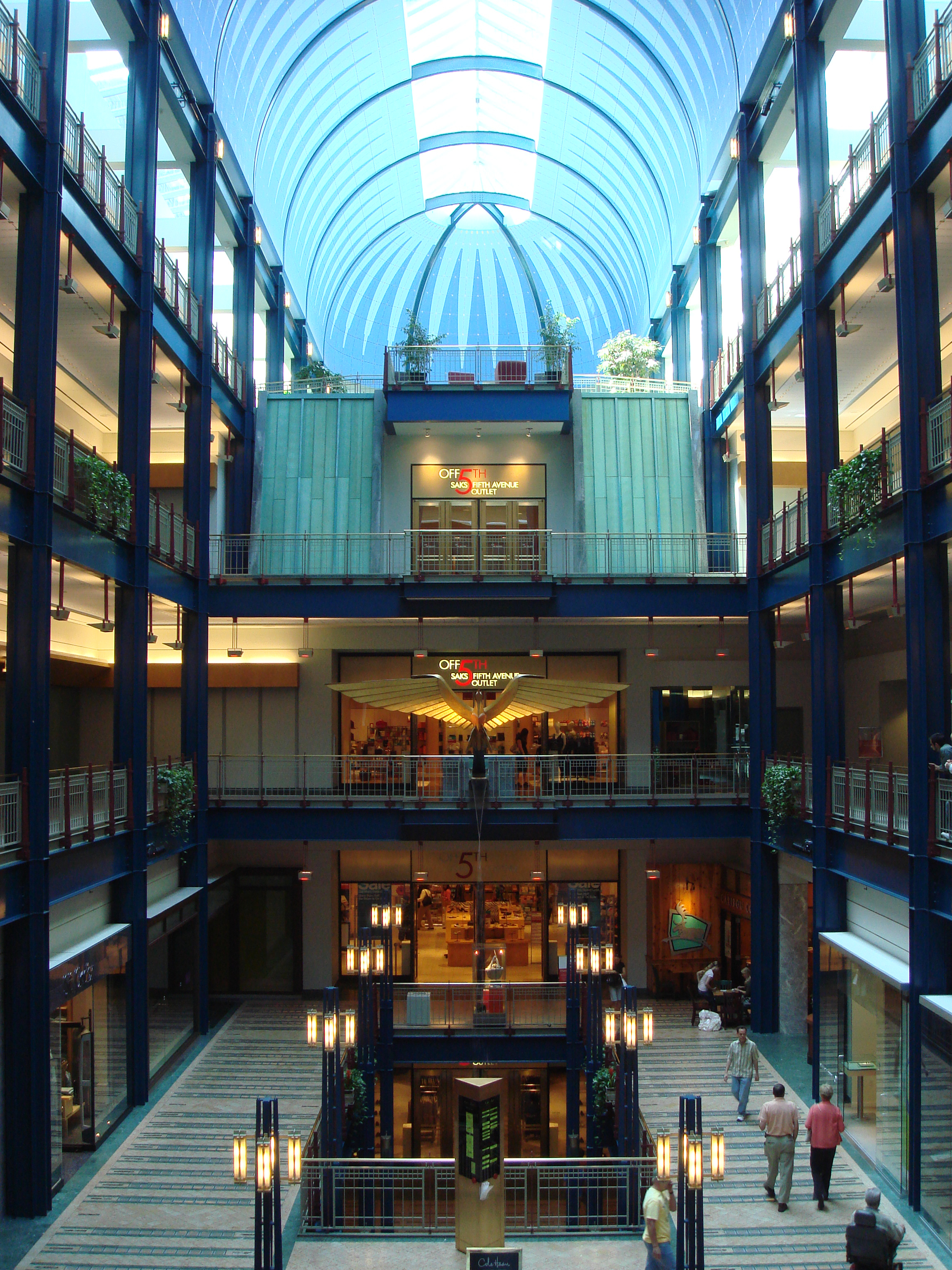
The interior of Gaviidae Common I in 2007.

In January 2005, Saks Fifth Avenue vacated its 84,000-square-foot (7,800 m^{2}) while retaining a 27,000-square-foot (2,500 m^{2}) section for its Saks Off Fifth clearance store. Neiman Marcus announced plans in July 2012 to close its 118,000-square-foot (11,000 m^{2}) retail space by 2013 due to "underperforming" and the location's inability to achieve "long-term operational goals" for the chain. After KBS Companies' acquisition of Gaviidae Common II in 2013, other plans were released to renovate and make improvements to both Gaviidae Common II and the neighboring RBC Plaza skyscraper. Following the vacancy left from Neiman Marcus, KBS expressed interest in turning the upper levels of the building into office tenants. The shopping mall's food court – State Fare – was located on the fourth floor of Gaviidae Common II and featured national eateries such as Burger King, McDonald's, Taco Bell, and Taco John's. State Fare was closed and converted into additional office space for RBC Plaza. Costs for the repurposing of the food court were estimated at US$4 million and construction began after the restaurant tenants closed in October 2013. Other renovations occurred in the basement level, where a fitness center and locker rooms were constructed for RBC Plaza employee usage.

Nightingale Properties acquired Gaviidae Common I in 2013 for US$26.25 million. In October 2014, the company subdivided the building into six parts for resale. In December 2014, the company sold its 450-stall parking garage to Gaviidae Commons LLC, a partnership associated with InterPark from Chicago. Saks Off Fifth closed on January 17, 2015, and relocated across the street to Minneapolis City Center. Shortly after its closure, Walgreens began developing parts of the first and second floors where Saks Off Fifth Avenue once stood. In June 2016, the YMCA purchased three floors of Gaviidae Common I for US$9.9 million, and resold a 50,000-square-foot (4,600 m^{2}) section on the third and fourth floors to United Properties, part of the space previously occupied by Saks. YMCA spent over US$30 million in developing space at Gaviidae Common, before opening its doors to the public on March 6, 2018. The fitness center held a grand opening event which included a ribbon-cutting ceremony attended by Minneapolis' mayor Jacob Frey. In addition to serving as the new home for the Douglass Dayton YMCA, it includes office space for 400 employees and the local YMCA headquarters.

== Design and layout ==
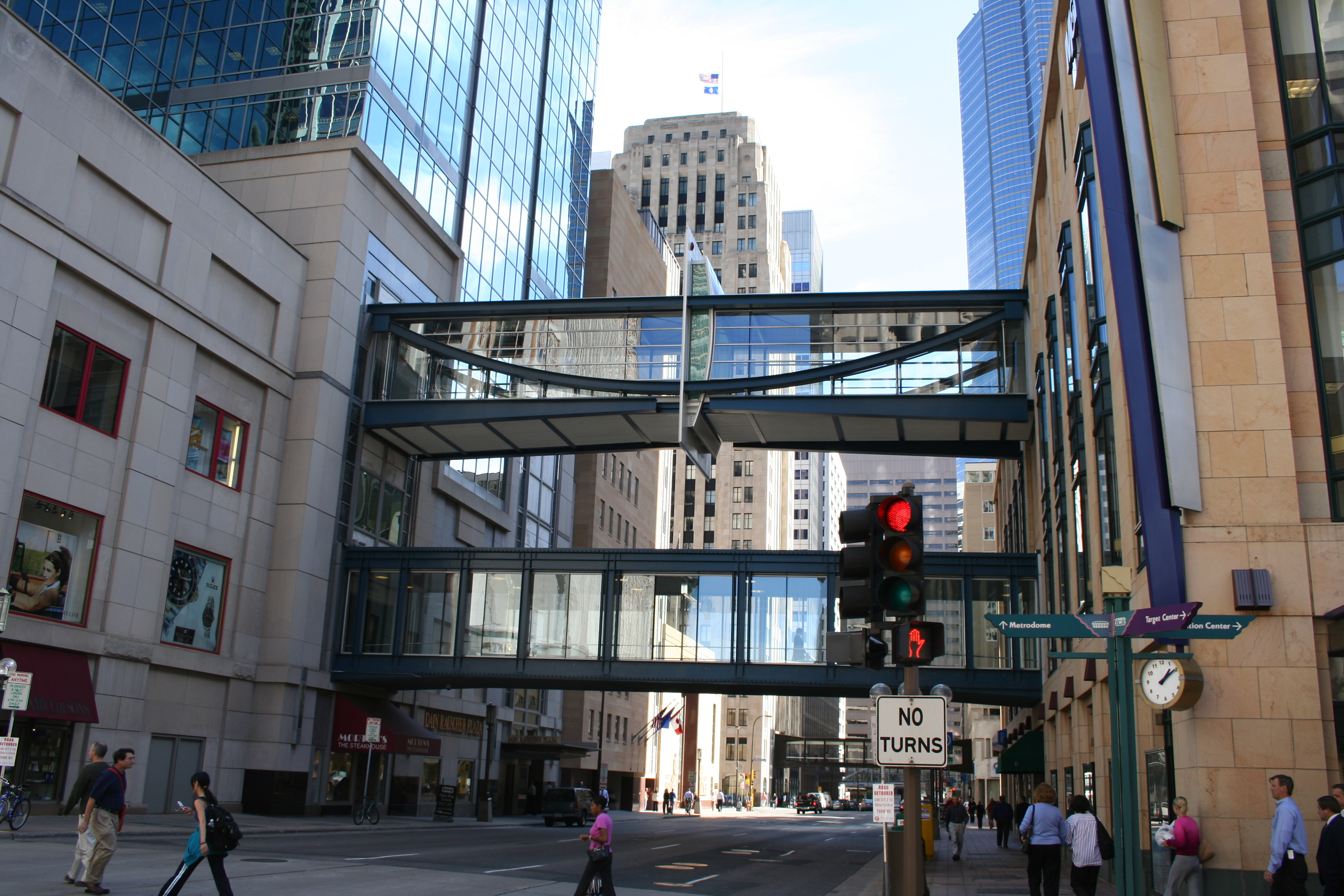
Two skyways connect Gaviidae Common II (left) to Gaviidae Common I (right).

Gaviidae Common I was designed by Argentine American architect César Pelli in 1989. It serves as Pelli's second of three buildings in Minneapolis, preceded by Wells Fargo Center in 1988 and succeeded by the Minneapolis Central Library in 2006. It encompasses five floors and approximately two-and-a-half levels of underground parking underneath the street level. The retail section surrounds an atrium supported by a "grid of [...] dark blue" pillars. The exterior of Gaviidae Common I uses "fixtures [...] of bronze and dark green metal [and] clear glass bay windows". Other materials commonly found throughout the shopping mall include "Italian marbles, glass block and gold accents". The center atrium, featuring a "celestial design [that] is a graphic representation of Minnesota's Northern sky" is currently the "largest barrel-vaulted ceiling in the state"; additionally, a 600 lb (270 kg) sculpture of a loon, designed by artists Deborah Sussman and Paul Prejza, is hung in the atrium. Loons belong to the family Gaviidae, hence the shopping center's namesake.

The mall's northern block, Gaviidae Common II, was designed by Chicago-based Lohan Associates and was completed in 1991, atop where Minneapolis' JCPenney department store formerly stood. In contrast to Gaviidae Common I, the northern block features red-accented columns and railings and once housed the world's only "upward-flowing waterfall". The two skyways adjoining both Gaviidae Common buildings contains Minneapolis' "first fourth-floor skyway". Four other skyways connect Gaviidae Common to 33 South Sixth, 50 South Sixth, IDS Center, and Wells Fargo Center. The skyway adjoining Gaviidae Common I to 33 South Sixth was designed in collaboration between Pelli and Iranian American architect Siah Armajani.
