= Cardigan Donuts =

Doughnut shop in Minneapolis, Minnesota, US

- Cardigan Donuts' flagship store in Minneapolis City Center
- Type: Private
- Industry: Food and beverage; coffeehouse
- Founded: May 11, 2017; 9 years ago in Minneapolis, Minnesota, U.S.
- Founder: Justin Bedford and Jeff Bull
- Number of locations: 3 (2026)
- Products: Baked goods; hot beverages; iced beverages; ice cream
- Website: cardigandonuts.com

Cardigan Donuts is an American doughnut shop and coffeehouse located in Minneapolis, Minnesota. Co-founders Justin Bedford and Jeff Bull opened the brand's flagship store in May 2017, located inside of the Minneapolis City Center shopping mall. The restaurant, known for selling comfort food, offers daily made doughnuts, yogurt bowls, hot and iced beverages, and kombucha. It caters, mainly, to the business clientele and users of the Minneapolis Skyway System. A second location, with an ice cream bar, opened in June 2022, on the second floor of the IDS Center, and a third one in the US Bank Plaza complex, opened in October 2025.

== Description ==
Cardigan Donuts was established as a privately held doughnut shop in 2017 by co-founders Justin Bedford and Jeff Bull. The store sells three categories of daily made doughnuts, available in "Classic", "Premium", and "Inspired" varieties, respectively. The "Inspired" doughnuts are offered in two varieties at a time, and are available in flavors that rotate twice weekly. The store's original bakery manager, Daniel Rosene, tested out many of the available flavor combinations in the years leading up to its opening. Some of the offered "Inspired" flavors include the Rainbow Road, a Super Mario Kart-inspired doughnut with rainbow dough, white chocolate frosting, candied walnuts, and cereal marshmallows; the chicken and waffle doughnut with a "crackling chicken skin" topping; and the red hot doughnut with Red Hots candy and cinnamon. Other doughnut varieties are the Raised Bar, Raised Glazed, Vanilla Cake, and options with house-made fruit jams. Baked goods that are not sold by the end of the day are donated to local food banks, or the Salvation Army. Cardigan Donuts also sells hot and iced espresso beverages, in addition to coffee, teas, and kombucha. The City Center location features a gift wall with locally made items and clothing, supplied by the former Greater Goods store in Minneapolis.

The flagship location is open six days a week, being closed on Sundays. Their smaller, second store is open Monday through Friday. Local architectural firm Smart Associates designed both Cardigan Donuts stores. The larger City Center store features a mid-century modern sitting room, orange accented walls, and a fireplace. It also contains a conference room-style space in the restaurant's rear, designed to hold business meetings. To receive feedback on new flavors, Cardigan Donuts occasionally offers formal doughnut samplings in this space, in an event experience referred to as the Donut Lab.

== History ==
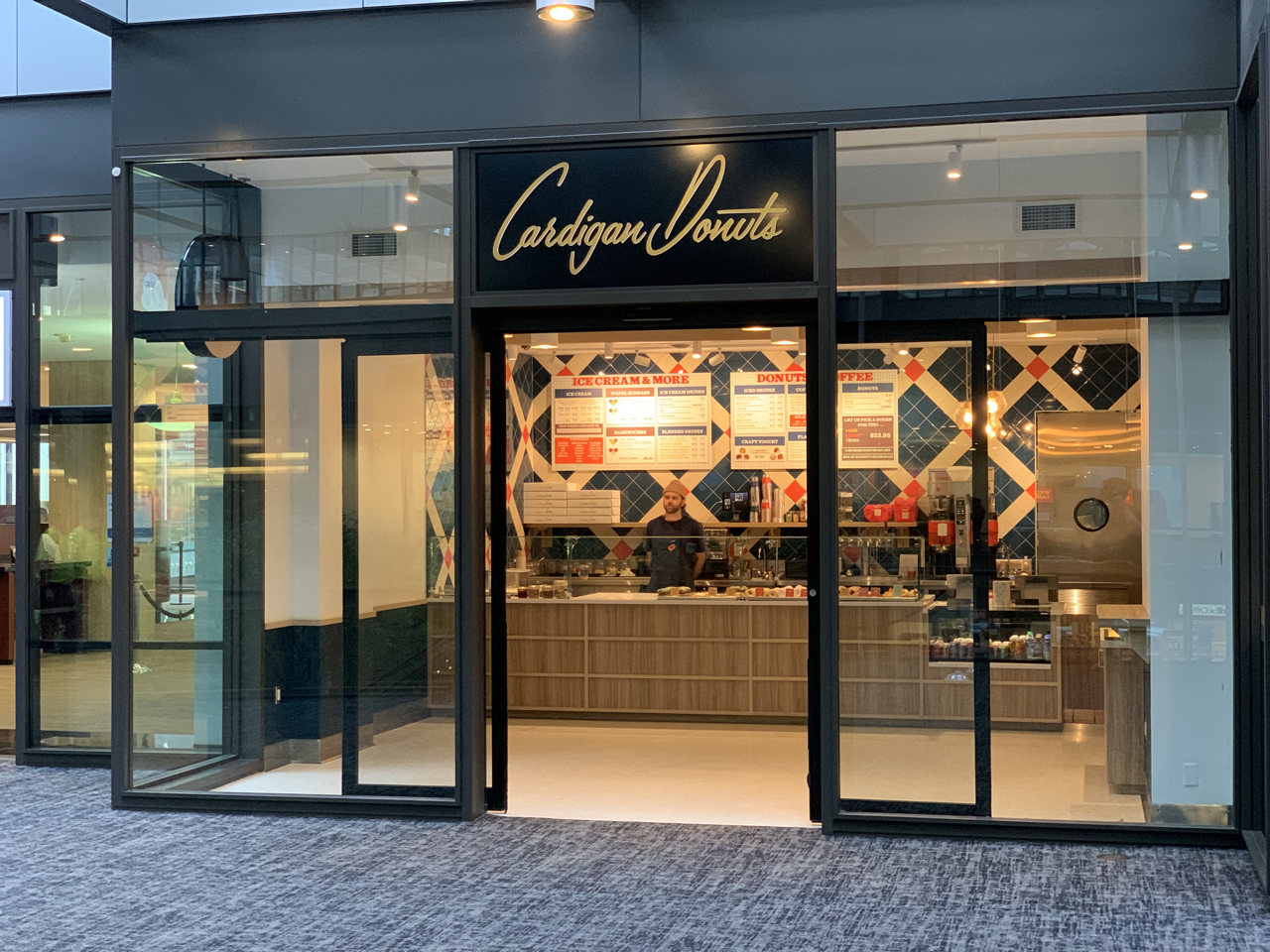
Cardigan Donuts' IDS Center storefront in 2022

Cardigan Donuts opened their flagship location on May 11, 2017, in a 2,600 square feet (240 m^{2}) space inside the Minneapolis City Center shopping mall. It is located on the mall's second level, or "skyway" level, and is situated next to a Naf Naf Grill restaurant. The concept for Cardigan Donuts was first announced in January 2017, with an opening scheduled for May. Regarding his decision to open a location inside the Minneapolis Skyway System, Bedford stated: "I've spent my whole professional career working in the skyway and love the people and culture here. We've made Cardigan Donuts specifically for all the co-workers, clients, and friends we've gotten to know over the years."

During the COVID-19 pandemic, Cardigan Donuts remained open and began offering a delivery service, which the Star Tribune's Joy Summers felt helped concrete the restaurant's status amongst locals as a beloved bakery. The restaurant, however, briefly closed in 2020 at the height of the nearby George Floyd protests.

On June 22, 2022, Cardigan Donuts opened their second, smaller location inside of the IDS Center's Crystal Court retail atrium, in a 650 square feet (60 m^{2}) storefront that formerly housed the regional frozen yogurt chain Yogurt Lab. It was initially slated to open earlier in the year, according to its press release. Star Tribune's Sharyn Jackson noted that the addition of the store in Crystal Court was welcomed, as the mall once contained a local doughnut kiosk, Bogart's Doughnuts, which ultimately closed in 2020. The new Cardigan Donuts location offers the same doughnut menu as their flagship store, in addition to smoothies, house-made ice cream and specialty desserts.

== Reception ==
The opening of Cardigan Donuts' flagship City Center location "drew long lines" in May 2017. It also has the highest Yelp rating of any doughnut shop in Minneapolis. Rick Nelson from Star Tribune highlighted the French cruller doughnut, calling it "a cruller to end all crullers", and appreciated the addition of lower-calorie options, like oatmeal and yogurt, to the store's menu; Nelson ultimately listed Cardigan Donuts amongst the top 10 dining establishments inside of the Minneapolis Skyway System. Jackson, from the same publication, recommended the glazed old-fashioned doughnut. The two editors behind Minnevangelist called the latter doughnut "one of the best old-fashioned donuts we've ever tasted". Minneapolis St. Paul Magazine featured the seasonal Rainbow Road doughnut on their list of favorite doughnuts from Minnesota bakeries. In March 2023, the Chicago Tribune named Cardigan Donuts one of the 40 best doughnut shops in the United States.

During the 2022 occurrence of the Minnesota State Fair, Cardigan Donuts offered limited edition fried pickle fritter and cotton candy cake as "Inspired" doughnuts. Racket's Em Cassel wrote about the former option: "The first few seconds are kind of confusing to your senses, but I found myself going back for bite after bite, intrigued by this unusual and perhaps ungodly addition to Cardigan's pastry canon."

== See also ==
- List of doughnut shops
