= Walkin' Dog =

Restaurant in Minneapolis

Coordinates: 44.9766°N 93.2695°W

- Walkin' Dog's Northstar Center storefront in April 2023
- Interactive map of Walkin' Dog

Restaurant information
- Established: 1991
- Closed: April 21, 2023
- Owner: Dave Magnuson
- Food type: American
- Location: 618 Second Avenue South, Minneapolis, Hennepin, Minnesota, 55402, United States
- Website: walkindog.com

Walkin' Dog was an American hot dog stand located in Minneapolis, Minnesota. Owned by Dave Magnuson, the restaurant had been located inside the first floor food court of the Northstar Center office complex from 1991 to 2023, though it relocated to a different retail space within the same building in 2021. The restaurant's menu consisted of mostly hot dogs, made with Vienna sausage and including Chicago-style, in addition to nachos, pretzels, and ice cream. It was frequently cited by local publications as one of the most affordable dining options in the Minneapolis Skyway System.

Following the effects of the COVID-19 pandemic and nearby George Floyd protests, the restaurant experienced a significant loss in customers beginning in 2020, and as a result of Northstar Center's renovation project, Walkin' Dog closed on April 21, 2023. The following year, Magnuson announced the restaurant would reopen following the completion of renovations.

== Description ==
The shop's menu consists of mostly hot dogs, in addition to pretzels, nachos, popcorn, and ice cream. They offer made-to-order hot dogs using imported Vienna sausage, and are noted for their Chicago-style hot dogs with a poppyseed bun and its traditional green relish.

== History ==
Walkin' Dog originally occupied the smallest stall in the Northstar Center's lower level food court, in a 250 square feet (23 m^{2}) space adjacent to the building's interior hotel entrance. It is located one floor below the Minneapolis Skyway System and once neighbored eateries like Arby's, Burger King, and Cheetah Pizza. Rachel Hutton from the Star Tribune described its offbeat location as being "wedged into a dark corner", while Minnesota Monthly's Susan Du compared it to the size of a postage stamp. Owner Dave Magnuson took over the business in 1991 following a newspaper ad seeking food service workers. After Northstar Center lost several major tenants in the 1990s, he began dressing up in a hot dog costume and would walk the Skyway System to promote his business. American sports writer Sid Hartman was a regular customer during his tenure at nearby WCCO Radio.

Following the closure of the neighboring Arby's restaurant in 2018, Walkin' Dog became the longest operational tenant at Northstar Center. During the COVID-19 pandemic and after unrest as a result of the George Floyd protests, the restaurant experienced a 70 to 80% reduction in business. In addition, it became the last remaining tenant in Northstar Center's food court during its final operational year, with Magnuson remarking: "It was a neighborhood down here and now I'm the only one left". He described Minneapolis as eerie after the COVID-19 pandemic and compared the drastic loss of downtown customers to that of the city following the September 11 attacks in 2001; he said: "Honestly I'm kind of glad I'm at the age where I cannot do this a whole lot longer if I choose not to, it's kind of terrifying." Later in 2021, Walkin' Dog moved to a different space within the same Northstar Center food court, taking over a space previously housing Cayol's Oasis Frozen Yogurt.

Beginning in 2022, Northstar Center started a renovation project that would turn the former Crowne Plaza hotel into a Hotel Indigo, convert the eastern office tower into apartment residences, and refurbish the existing western office tower. According to a Facebook post shared on the restaurant's official page, Walkin' Dog will close on April 21, 2023, as a result of the renovation project, which would close the food court for the duration of a year. Magnuson stated that the building's property management offered Walkin' Dog a new space following its reopening, but he declined their offer. He wrote: "We wish to thank you for your patronage, conversation, encouragement, and mostly, your friendship in the last 31+ years."

In January 2024, Magnuson announced via LinkedIn that he would reopen a new Walkin' Dog location inside of Northstar Center later that year, following the commencement of building renovations.

== Reception ==
The restaurant has been noted for its affordability. In 1999, the Star Tribune highlighted its prices in an article covering cheap Minneapolis meals, such as US$2.50 for two hot dogs, or $1.25 for a milkshake. A 2019 article from the same publication noted that despite downtown Minneapolis' decrease in popularity for typical fast food spots, Walkin' Dog was an exception and still offered menu items for $2.45. During the COVID-19 pandemic, Magnuson stated he was urged by customers to raise prices due to operational cost increases, but decided against it to prevent spending on new signage.

The Star Tribune's Rick Nelson recommended Walkin' Dog as one of the nine best food staples within the Minneapolis Skyway System.

== See also ==
- List of hot dog restaurants
