= Richard Kovacevich =

American business executive (born 1943)

Dick Kovacevich
- Born: Richard M. Kovacevich; October 30, 1943 (age 83)
- Education: Stanford Business School (MBA); Stanford University (BS, MS)
- Occupations: Business executive and investor

Richard Marco Kovacevich (born October 30, 1943) is an American business executive and the former CEO of Wells Fargo & Company.

== Early life and education ==
A native of Tacoma, Washington, he grew up in Enumclaw, Washington, a small city about 30 miles southeast of Seattle, where his father (of Croatian origin) worked in the sawmill. His parents are Joseph and Dorothy Kovacevich. At Stanford University he received BS and MS degrees in industrial engineering, followed by an MBA degree from Stanford Business School in 1967.

== Career ==
=== General Mills ===
Early in his corporate career, Kovacevich was a strategic planner with General Mills. He became chief financial officer of Palitoy, a UK company acquired by General Mills, and later general manager of General Mills' Kenner Products.

=== Citicorp ===
Kovacevich joined Citibank in 1975, where he ran mortgage, consumer finance and other retail operations in New York state. At Citi he rolled out the company's automated teller machine (ATM) network. He is credited with turning around Citi's New York branch system and doubling the market share of Citi's credit card business. Kovacevich left Citibank in 1986, after being passed over for Citigroup's top consumer banking job.

=== Norwest / Wells Fargo ===
He then joined Norwest Bank as chief operating officer and head of the retail banking group in March 1986. At Norwest, Kovacevich confronted a similar situation. Norwest was mostly centered in Minnesota and Iowa at the time, with a relatively small population in both states. Kovacevich realized the only way he could keep growing the company would be to expand beyond banking services, into investment and insurance services as well. Kovacevich theorized that eventually it would be impossible for any bank to continuously grow if it did not do this.

Kovacevich instituted the new strategies while serving as president of Norwest from 1989, chief executive officer from 1993, and chairman from 1995. The higher revenues, relative to stable fixed costs which this method produced allowed Norwest to purchase many other banks, culminating with the 1998 purchase of Wells Fargo. Although Norwest was effectively the survivor, the merged company retained the better-known Wells Fargo name and moved to Wells Fargo's headquarters in San Francisco. After the merger, Kovacevich was given the positions of president and CEO of Wells Fargo. In 2001 he was elected chairman as well.

He relinquished the presidency of Wells Fargo to John Stumpf in August 2005. On June 27, 2007, the board of directors elected Stumpf CEO, with Kovacevich retaining the chairmanship.

In September 2009 Wells Fargo announced Kovacevich would step down as chairman and a director at the end of 2009 and retire from the company in early 2010 after 23 years with Norwest and Wells Fargo. As of October 2020, it was reported that he still had an office and personal assistant at Wells Fargo.

=== Other positions ===
Besides Wells Fargo, Kovacevich is a former member of the boards of directors of Cisco, and Target Corporation. He is also vice president of the board of governors of the San Francisco Symphony, vice chairman of the San Francisco Museum of Modern Art, and a member of Governor Arnold Schwarzenegger's California Commission on Jobs and Economic Growth, the National Infrastructure Advisory Committee, and the Financial Services Roundtable.

==== Hudson Executive Capital ====
In June 2015, it was announced that Kovacevich is a CEO partner and had invested in Hudson Executive Capital, LP, an activist hedge fund.

==== Theranos ====
Kovacevich joined the board of directors of Theranos in 2013 on the recommendation of George Shultz. The board transitioned from an advisory role to a fiduciary one in mid-2016. Despite criticisms, Kovacevich defended Theranos as "a good company" and claimed the treatment of CEO Elizabeth Holmes was "unfair." He resigned from the board in February 2017 and was deposed in 2018. He had invested over $4 million in the company.

== Personal life ==
Kovacevich is married to Mary Jo and is the father of three children.

In the political realm, he has supported Jeb Bush, Mitt Romney, John McCain, and Kamala Harris.
