= Forum Cafeteria (Minneapolis) =

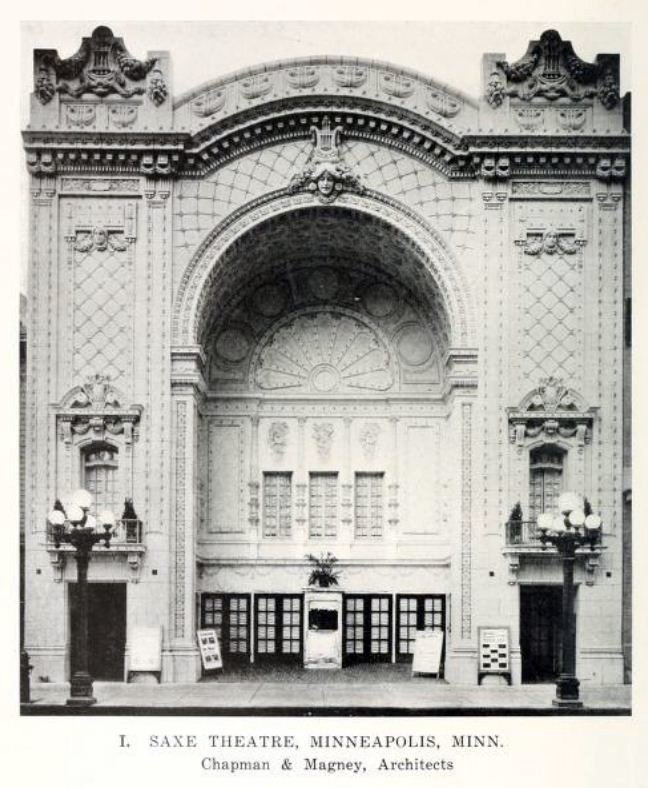
- The Saxe Theater in 1914, a decade and a half before it became the Forum (for which the exterior remained mostly unchanged)
- Interactive map of the Forum Cafeteria area

General information
- Location: 36 South 7th Street, Minneapolis, Minnesota
- Coordinates: 44°58′40″N 93°16′25″W

The Forum Cafeteria was a restaurant in Minneapolis. It was located at 36 South 7th Street in a building originally constructed in 1914 as the Saxe Theater, later the Strand Theater. A 1930 reconstruction repurposed the theater into a restaurant with a stunning Art Deco interior of black onyx and pale green tiles, sconces, chandeliers, and mirrors with a Minnesota-themed motif: pine cones, waterfalls, and Viking ships.

The cafeteria did not outlive the era of fast food and closed its doors in August 1975. Threatened with redevelopment, the building was placed on the National Register of Historic Places on March 16, 1976. Three months later the old Forum opened as Scottie's on Seventh, a disco nightclub that retained the Art Deco style of the Forum. When the venue was again threatened with demolition to make way for the Minneapolis City Center project, preservationists brought suit; the developers were ordered to disassemble the 3500 pieces of glass and reassemble the Art Deco interior within a new space in City Center.

Thus relocated to 18 South 7th Street, Scottie's on Seventh reopened in 1983 but closed in 1985. The property was delisted from National Register in 1987. Several restaurants have occupied the space since then: the Paramount Cafe, Mick's, Goodfellow's from 1996 to 2005, The Forum, and Il Foro from 2015 to 2016.. The most recent tenant, a French-Moroccan restaurant called Fhima's, operated in the space from 2018 to 2026.

== Gallery ==
The reassembled Forum Cafeteria bar in 2024

Part of the reassembled interior
