= Rider Bennett =

American law firm

Rider Bennett, LLP was a 47-year-old law firm based in Minneapolis, Minnesota, that closed in May 2007. It was founded in 1960 by Stu Rider, Gene Bennett and Bill Egan, who had attended the University of Minnesota Law School together. They were later joined by Chet Johnson and Ed Arundel. The firm was known as Rider Bennett Egan Johnson and Arundel for a short time, but for most of its history was known as Rider Bennett Egan & Arundel.

It had 190 employees at the time of its closure, 90 of whom were attorneys. Former managing partner Gregory Weyandt attributed the firm's demise to the growth of national law firms in the legal market. Unable to reach an accommodation with its former landlord, the Rider Bennett law firm, which closed its doors at the end of May of 2007, sought Chapter 11 bankruptcy protection.

Rider Bennett had been a tenant at the office building 33 South Sixth since 2004.
