= Nankin Cafe =

Coordinates: 44.9780177°N 93.2743152°W

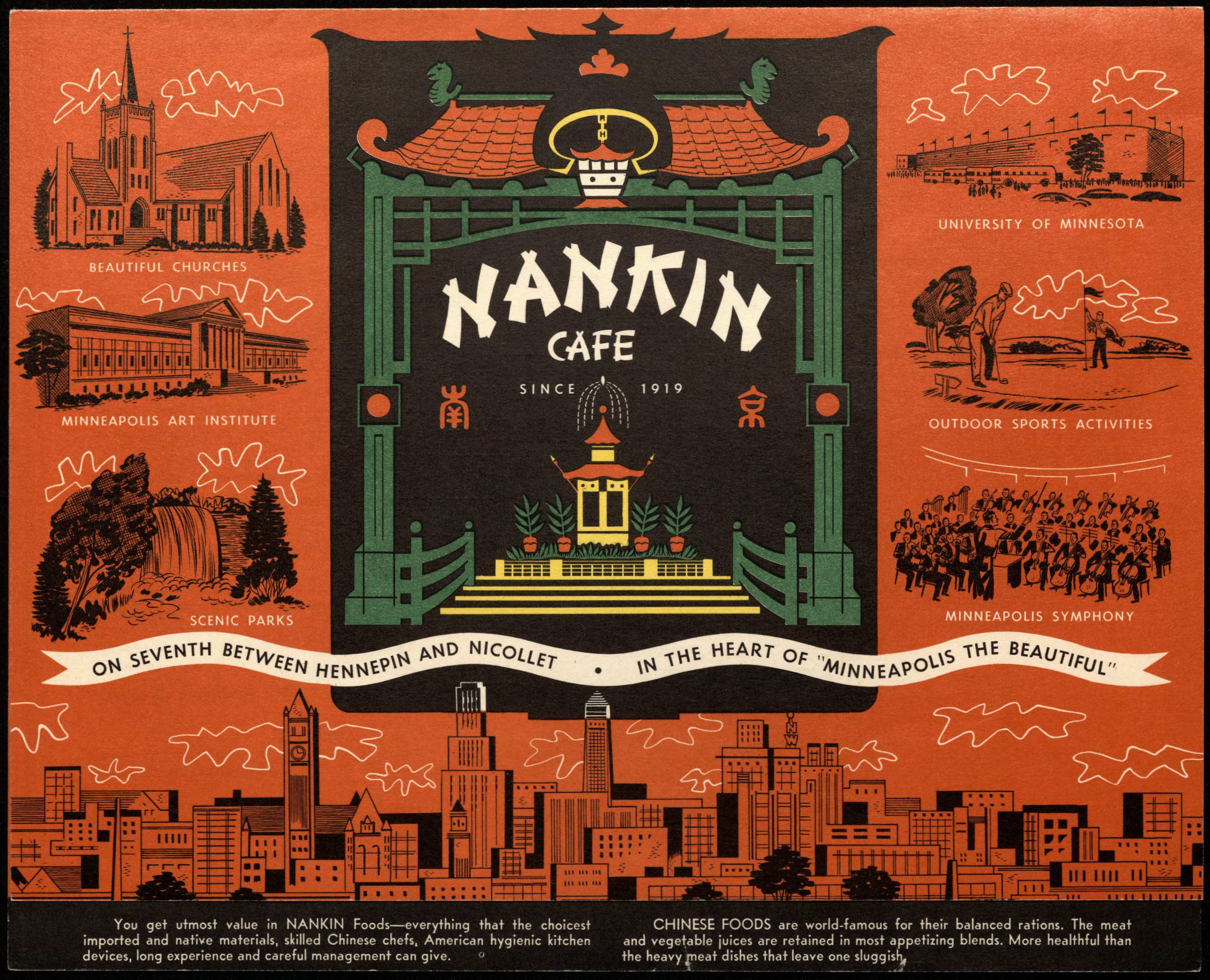
- Nankin Cafe Menu, 1954
- Interactive map of Nankin Cafe

Restaurant information
- Established: 1919
- Owner: Closed
- Food type: Chinese
- Location: 15 S. 7th St. (1919-1958); 20 S. 7th St. (1958-1980); 7th St. @ Hennepin Av. (City Center) (1981-1999), Minneapolis, Hennepin, Minnesota, 55402 (all three locations), United States

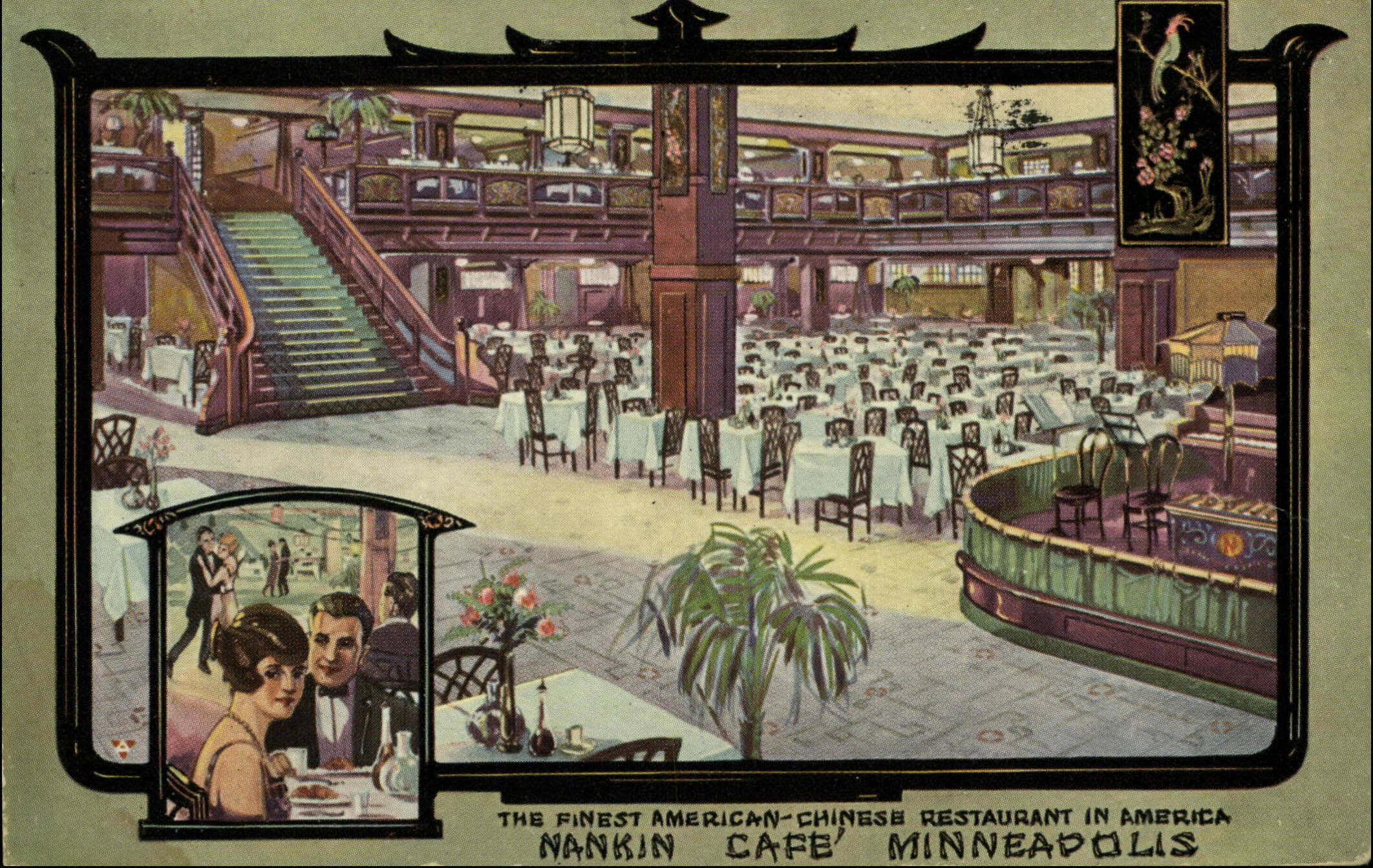
"The finest American-Chinese restaurant in America" (1922)

Nankin Cafe was a Chinese restaurant in Minneapolis, Minnesota, United States. It was considered "a downtown Minneapolis landmark for 80 years". Founded by Walter James in 1919 at 15 S. 7th Street, now the site of the Dayton-Radisson parking ramp, it was sold in 1949 to the Golden and Chalfen families. The restaurant moved across 7th Street to 20 S. 7th Street in 1958. In 1980 it was razed, along with the entire block (1979–1980), to make way for the City Center shopping center, after its owners agreed to a settlement allowing it to relocate in the new center, which it did in 1981 upon completion of the complex. The Nankin was owned by the Wu family for the last 10 years of its existence. It has been recognized for its chow mein and egg foo yung dishes that were offered as a subgum (mixed meat and vegetables) variation.

Several factors that may have contributed to the restaurant's demise include the decline in popularity of traditional Chinese-American food, a five-month shutdown of the restaurant during a strike in late 1988, a drug raid by Minneapolis police in 1997 in which 19 customers were arrested, and the filing for bankruptcy protection by the Wu family.
