= Individual Taxpayer Identification Number =

United States tax processing number

- Acronym: ITIN
- Organization: Internal Revenue Service
- Introduced: July 1, 1996; 29 years ago
- No. of digits: 9

An Individual Taxpayer Identification Number (ITIN) is a United States tax processing number issued by the Internal Revenue Service (IRS). ITINs are issued by the IRS to individuals who do not have and are not eligible to obtain a valid U.S. Social Security Number (SSN), but who are required by law to file a U.S. Individual Income Tax Return.

Regardless of immigration status, both resident and nonresident immigrants may have federal tax return and payment responsibilities under the Internal Revenue Code. Individuals must have a filing requirement and file a valid federal income tax return to receive an ITIN, unless they meet an exception. An ITIN application cannot be filed electronically (efile). The application must be attached to a valid federal income tax return unless the individual qualifies for an exception.

The ITIN program was created on July 1, 1996 for the purpose of allowing tax return filing by individuals without a Social Security Number (SSN). Receiving an ITIN does not in itself confer the right to work and receive income in the United States. ITINs are also used by real estate brokers to facilitate mortgages for unauthorized aliens. In addition to use by unauthorized aliens, ITINs are used by foreign investors in United States real estate. Such investors need ITINs in order to file federal and state tax returns to report rental income.

In 2006, 1.4 million people used ITINs when filing tax returns. Federal tax law generally prohibits the IRS from sharing data with other government agencies, including the Department of Homeland Security (DHS), assuring unauthorized aliens that the tax information will be confidential and generally will not be used to initiate removal procedures.

It is a nine-digit number beginning with the number "9", has a range of numbers from "50" to "65", "70" to "88", "90" to "92" and "94" to "99" for the fourth and fifth digits, and is formatted like a SSN (i.e., 9XX-XX-XXXX).

Individuals who meet eligibility requirements can file an ITIN application themselves. This involves submitting IRS form W-7, which records biographical information, along with specified types of valid supporting ID and a tax return. Applicants can apply directly or file with a certifying acceptance agent, who can assist with the application process for a fee. ITINs can also be issued for a spouse or dependents, if documentation and signature requirements are met and they are claimed on a valid tax return. Effective June 22, 2012, the IRS began requiring most applicants, even those using acceptance agents, to submit original supporting documents or copies certified by their issuing agency. The IRS will not accept notarized copies of the passport for ITIN application. Certified true copies of foreign passports can sometimes be obtained from U.S. embassies abroad. Individuals required to file a tax return must check boxes b, c, d, e, f, or g on the W-7 application. Individuals who check boxes a, f, or h meet certain conditions for not filing a U.S. tax return, and for obtaining an ITIN from the IRS. Temporary identification numbers are issued to the main taxpayer only and these numbers are usually triggered after a 45-day suspension period. Filing the W-7 application incorrectly, checking the wrong box for the reason the individual is submitting a W-7 form, or if the taxpayer's identifying documents are not accepted by the IRS, can be reasons for which the taxpayer may not receive a temporary taxpayer identification number.

In 2012, the IRS indicated that ITINs would expire after five years. In 2014, the IRS amended that policy to expire ITINs only if the numbers had not been used in the last five years. Under this revised policy, effective in 2016, all ITINs must be used to file a return or they will expire and be reassigned. This now includes those issued before 2013. The policy has since been revised again so that ITINs would expire after three years of non-use. In addition, ITINs issued prior to 2013 would begin expiring in 2016, starting with those with middle digits of 78 and 79 (example: 9XX-78-XXXX).
