= Norwest Corporation =

Former American banking and financial services company

- Final logo of Norwest, used from 1983
- Trade name: Norwest Bank
- Formerly: Northwest Bancorporation (1929–1983)
- Type: Public
- Traded as: NYSE: NOB
- Industry: Financial services
- Founded: January 24, 1929 (97 years ago) as Northwest Bancorporation
- Defunct: November 2, 1998 (28 years ago)
- Fate: Acquired Wells Fargo in 1998 and assumed the Wells Fargo name
- Successor: Wells Fargo
- Headquarters: Minneapolis, Minnesota, United States
- Area served: Minnesota, Wisconsin, Iowa, Nebraska, South Dakota, North Dakota, Montana, Arizona, Indiana, Illinois, Wyoming, Colorado, New Mexico, Nevada, and Texas
- Key people: Richard M. Kovacevich
- Website: archived official website

Norwest Corporation was a banking and financial services company based in Minneapolis, Minnesota, United States. In 1998, it merged with Wells Fargo & Co. and since that time has operated under the Wells Fargo name.

== History ==
=== Early formation ===
The earliest roots of the company are with the Northwestern National Bank established in Minneapolis in 1872. Early Minneapolis business and political leaders Dorilus Morrison and Henry T. Welles were the bank's first two presidents. Initially the bank was heavily supported by the Northern Pacific Railroad, but as the city and region grew the bank's deposits and assets grew in kind. Between 1872 and 1892 the bank's deposits increased from $50,000 to $3 million. Between 1892 and 1902 deposits more than tripled to more than $10 million.

=== Great Depression and Banco ===
During the generally prosperous 1920s, the nation's agricultural sector did not share in the good times. Many smaller banks that had overextended credit to farmers ran into serious trouble. In the Upper Midwest alone, 1,500 banks became insolvent from 1920 to 1929. It was with this backdrop that in early 1929, just months before the stock market crash, two banking associations were formed in the Twin Cities of Minnesota: Northwest Bancorporation and the First Bank Stock Corporation (later known as First Bank System and then U.S. Bancorp).

Northwest, known more simply as "Banco", was a banking cooperative anchored by Northwestern National Bank in Minneapolis. Banco acquired stock in the affiliated banks and served as a mutual protection association. Another 90 banks joined Banco in its first year of operation, and by 1932 there were 139 affiliates.

During the Great Depression, numerous additional banks failed. In 1932, 700 Upper Midwestern banks failed. None of the Banco members went under – and no depositor lost any savings – because the group was able to move liquidity around the system and in some cases, inject new capital into troubled banks. The number of members did decline, however, as some units in the group merged while others were sold off. Membership fell to 83 by 1940, then to 70 by 1952.

One of Banco's strategic advantages in the long run was its ability to operate in multiple states. The McFadden Act of 1927 had prohibited banks from operating branches across state lines. Banco was one of three major banks (the others being First Bank System and First Interstate Bancorp) that was allowed to conduct interstate banking under a grandfather clause in the 1927 act. This advantage was tempered somewhat by the emergence of bank holding companies in the late 1960s, but under the holding company arrangement, a subsidiary bank in one state was a separate entity from a subsidiary bank in another state.

=== 1970s ===
Prior to the 1970s, Banco's affiliated members were largely autonomous. But during that decade, Banco began adopting a more unified structure in terms of systemwide planning, marketing, data processing, funds management, and loan syndication. By the end of the decade, Banco consisted of 85 affiliates in seven states: Minnesota, Wisconsin, Iowa, Nebraska, South Dakota, North Dakota, and Montana. Total assets had reached $11 billion, ranking Banco as the 20th largest banking company in the United States. Banco was also active on the international banking scene through its lead bank, Northwestern National, which controlled Canadian American Bank, a merchant bank with offices in Winnipeg, London, Nassau, and Luxembourg.

=== 1980s, and restructuring into Norwest ===
Banco was beset by a series of major setbacks in the early 1980s. The troubles actually began in June of 1979 when Richard H. Vaughan, the president and CEO, was electrocuted by a wire that had fallen during a storm. This set off a management crisis. Chester Lind stepped in as a caretaker leader until a more permanent successor could be found. In October 1981 John W. Morrison was named chairman and CEO.

The new leader began centralizing the still loosely knit confederation into a more traditional bank holding company. In 1982 the 80-odd affiliates began to be grouped into eight regions reporting to a corporate vice-chairman. Plans were also laid to unify all the affiliates and Banco itself under a new name. The change occurred in 1983, when Northwest Bancorporation became Norwest Corporation. Tellingly, the new name did not include 'bank' or some variant thereof because Morrison aimed to reposition Norwest as a diversified financial services company. He'd taken steps in this direction a year earlier, when he engineered the acquisition of Dial Corporation (not to be confused with the consumer products company of the same name) in September 1982 for $252 million. Based in Des Moines, Iowa, Dial had more than 460 offices in 38 states offering consumer loans for everything from cars to sailboats. It was considered one of the top consumer finance firms in the country and had a $1 billion consumer loan operation. Dial was renamed Norwest Financial Services Inc. in 1983.

While these restructuring initiatives were being carried out, the bank suffered another blow during the 1982 Thanksgiving weekend when a Thanksgiving Day fire destroyed the downtown Minneapolis headquarters. Norwest immediately announced plans to build a modern 774-foot tower, the Norwest Center, as its replacement. However, until the Norwest Center opened in 1988, corporate staff was scattered around 26 different sites in the city, leading to numerous logistical difficulties.

Meanwhile, with the farm economy going into a tailspin starting in 1981, Norwest began feeling the effects of its heavy farm loan portfolio--$1.2 billion, or seven percent of its overall loan portfolio. Norwest had another $1.2 billion in loans in foreign markets, which caused additional problems in the early 1980s as Norwest, like most U.S. banks, had made many bad loans overseas. As a result, Norwest saw its non-performing loans increase 500 percent from 1983 to 1984, to more than $500 million. Further trouble came from the bank's mortgage unit, Norwest Mortgage Inc., which had been quickly built into the second largest holder of mortgages in the United States. In the summer of 1984, Norwest Mortgage lost nearly $100 million from an unsuccessful effort to hedge its mounting interest-rate risk on adjustable-rate mortgages. The loan losses and the mortgage debacle led to a drop in net income from $125.2 million in 1983 to $69.5 million in 1984.

In August 1984 the head of Norwest Mortgage was fired because of the hedging losses. By early 1985 substantial portions of Norwest Mortgage were divested, including operations involved in servicing mortgages and buying mortgages from other lenders for resale. The unit now focused strictly on originating mortgages. In the wake of Norwest's poor performance in 1984, Morrison resigned and was replaced by Lloyd P. Johnson, former vice-chairman of Security Pacific Corp. Johnson soon brought on board Richard M. Kovacevich, who was hired away from Citicorp to become vice-chairman and CEO of Norwest's banking group in early 1986 (he was named to the additional posts of president and COO of Norwest Corp. in January 1989). The new managers began slashing away at Norwest's bloated bureaucracy. They drastically curtailed the bank's agricultural and international loan portfolios, the former being reduced to $400 million by early 1989, the latter to $10 million. By December 1988, the nonperforming loan total stood at just $150 million. To help prevent future calamities, Norwest instituted tighter lending criteria.

On the banking side, Kovacevich continued the process of standardizing the operating methods of the various Norwest banks, increased marketing efforts, and expanded the services offered. He also began seeking acquisitions, particularly aiming to bolster Norwest's presence in key cities; in 1986, for example, Norwest acquired Toy National Bank of Sioux City, Iowa, which had assets of $145 million. At the same time came the pruning of some rural operations, including eight banks in southern Minnesota and seven branches in South Dakota. Later in the decade, opportunities to expand outside the group's traditional seven-state banking region began to arise as the barriers to interstate banking began to be dismantled. In 1988 Norwest entered rapidly growing Arizona for the first time through the purchase of a small bank near Phoenix. Norwest ended the 1980s fully recovered from its early-decade travails and ranking as one of the nation's most profitable regional banking companies and the 30th largest bank overall, with assets in excess of $25 billion. Net income stood at $237 million for 1989.

=== 1990s ===
Acquisitions continued in the early 1990s. By early 1991 Norwest had 291 bank branches in 11 states, having moved into Indiana, Illinois, and Wyoming. In April 1990 Norwest paid $173 million for Sheboygan-based First Interstate of Wisconsin (formerly Citizen's Bank of Sheboygan), a $2 billion concern. Also acquired was a troubled "savings and loan" in Norwest's home state, First Minnesota Savings Bank. The largest purchase yet came in 1992 when Norwest paid about $420 million in stock for United Banks of Colorado Inc., a bank based in Denver with total assets of $6.3 billion. Norwest Financial grew through acquisition as well, with the 1992 purchase of Trans Canada Credit, the second largest consumer finance firm in Canada. By the end of 1992 Norwest had total assets of $44.56 billion, more than double the figure of 1988. At the beginning of 1993, Johnson handed over his CEO position to Kovacevich.

Expansion of the banking operation into New Mexico and Texas came in 1993 through the acquisition of First United Bank Group Inc. of Albuquerque for about $490 million. First United had assets of $3.8 billion. Also in 1993, Norwest became the 4th-largest bank in Arizona by acquiring the Arizona operations of Citicorp (formerly United Bank of Arizona and Great Western Bank & Trust). Between January 1994 and June 1995, Norwest made an additional 25 acquisitions, including several in Texas, making it the most active acquirer among bank holding companies. In 1995 Norwest Mortgage became the nation's leading originator of home mortgages following the acquisition of Directors Mortgage Loan Corp., a Riverside, California-based lender with a residential mortgage portfolio of $13.1 billion.

The following year Norwest Mortgage became the biggest home-mortgage servicer as well through the $600 million purchase of the bulk of the mortgage unit of the Prudential Insurance Co. of America, otherwise known as Prudential Home Mortgage. Prudential's high-quality loan portfolio and technology was key to this acquisition.

Meanwhile, in May 1996, Norwest Financial completed the purchase of $1 billion-asset ITT Island Finance, a consumer finance company based in San Juan, Puerto Rico. About one-quarter of Norwest Corp.'s earnings were generated by Norwest Financial in the mid-1990s, with another 12 percent coming from Norwest Mortgage. The traditional community banking operations—which extended to 16 states by 1995—counted for only about 37 percent of the total. By year-end 1995, Norwest had total assets of $72.13 billion, making it the 13th largest bank holding company in the nation. Net income, which was nearing the $1 billion mark, had grown at a compounded annual rate of 25 percent over the previous eight years.

One of the keys to Norwest's success in the retail banking sector following the arrival of Kovacevich was the emphasis on relationship banking. His focus was on smaller customers, checking account depositors and small businesses, and he aimed to build relationships with them that would lead to cross-selling of other financial services – an auto loan, a mortgage, insurance, a mutual fund, and so on. To do so required the maintenance of an extensive network of bank branches staffed by well-trained tellers and bankers.

This ran counter to the mid-1990s trend in the industry away from expensive branch banking and toward impersonal ATMs and Internet banking – the latter of course making cross-selling difficult. It was also in this cross-selling that the main units of Norwest – the retail bank, the finance company, and the mortgage company – fit and worked together. Another key to Norwest's success was its focus on these three key areas; although it did have other operations, such as a successful venture capital unit, the bank was not moving into such areas as investment banking, unlike numerous other banks, and it was not attempting to compete with large New York City securities firms.

=== Merger with Wells Fargo ===
By the end of 1994, Norwest had become the 11th largest bank in the United States with total assets of $88.54 billion. With a branch network covering 16 states, Norwest had the largest contiguous bank franchise in the nation. Its strongest markets were in Minnesota, Texas, Colorado, and Iowa. Having only entered Texas in 1993, Norwest had built up a $10 billion presence there by buying 33 banks. Norwest Mortgage was national in scope, while Norwest Financial covered 49 states, along with additional operations in Guam, Saipan, Canada, the Caribbean, and Central America. Net income had reached $1.35 billion by 1994. Norwest had grown into this position of strength without completing any of the blockbuster mergers that shook up the banking industry in the 1990s, but in June 1998 the bank announced the pending merger with San Francisco-based Wells Fargo & Company in a stock swap worth $34 billion. Although Norwest was the surviving entity, retaining the Northwestern Bank charter, the merged company took the better-known Wells Fargo name and moved its headquarters to San Francisco. Norwest Bank, NA merged into Wells Fargo Bank, NA as the merged bank's legal banking entity. The merged company claims legacy Wells Fargo’s history (dating to 1852) as its own, and also adopted legacy Wells Fargo's ticker symbol, WFC. However, it retains Norwest's pre-1998 stock price history and corporate structure, and all pre-1998 SEC filings are under Norwest, not Wells Fargo. Former Wells Fargo stockholders held 52.5 percent of the newly combined company and former Norwest stockholders held 47.5 percent. Paul Hazen, chairman and CEO of Wells Fargo, become chairman of the merged bank, while Richard M. Kovacevich, chairman and CEO of Norwest, become president and CEO of the new organization. The merger was completed in November 1998.

== Weatherball ==
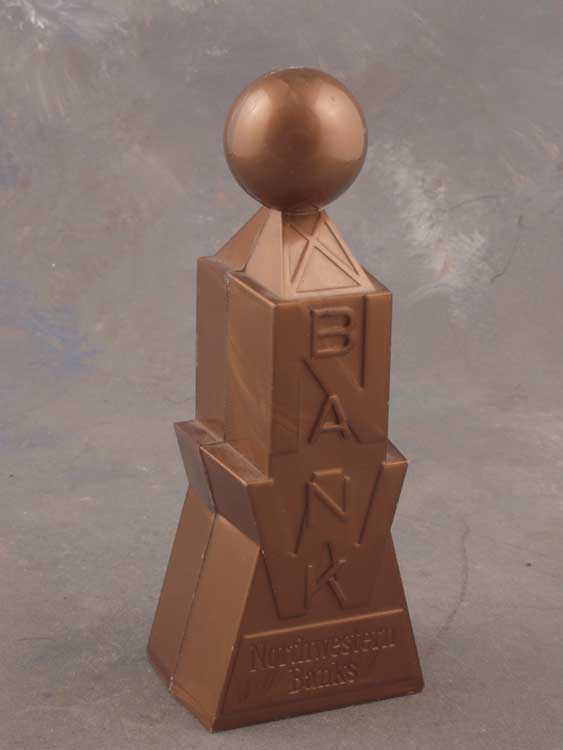
Weatherball coin bank

In 1949, Northwestern National Bank constructed a 157-foot high weatherball, designed by Douglas Leigh, atop its headquarters building in downtown Minneapolis. The bank incorporated it into its advertising and logo for a time. After the 1982 Minneapolis Thanksgiving Day Fire and before the building was demolished, the bank's weatherball was dismantled and stored at the Minnesota State Fairgrounds. The weatherball was never restored and, in 2000, it was scrapped.

The Northwestern National Bank Weatherball jingle:

"When the Weatherball is glowing red, warmer weather's just ahead.

When the Weatherball is shining white, colder weather is in sight.

When the Weatherball is wearing green, no weather changes are foreseen.

Colors blinking by night and day, say precipitation's on the way."
