= Wells Fargo Center (Minneapolis) =

Office tower in Minneapolis, Minnesota

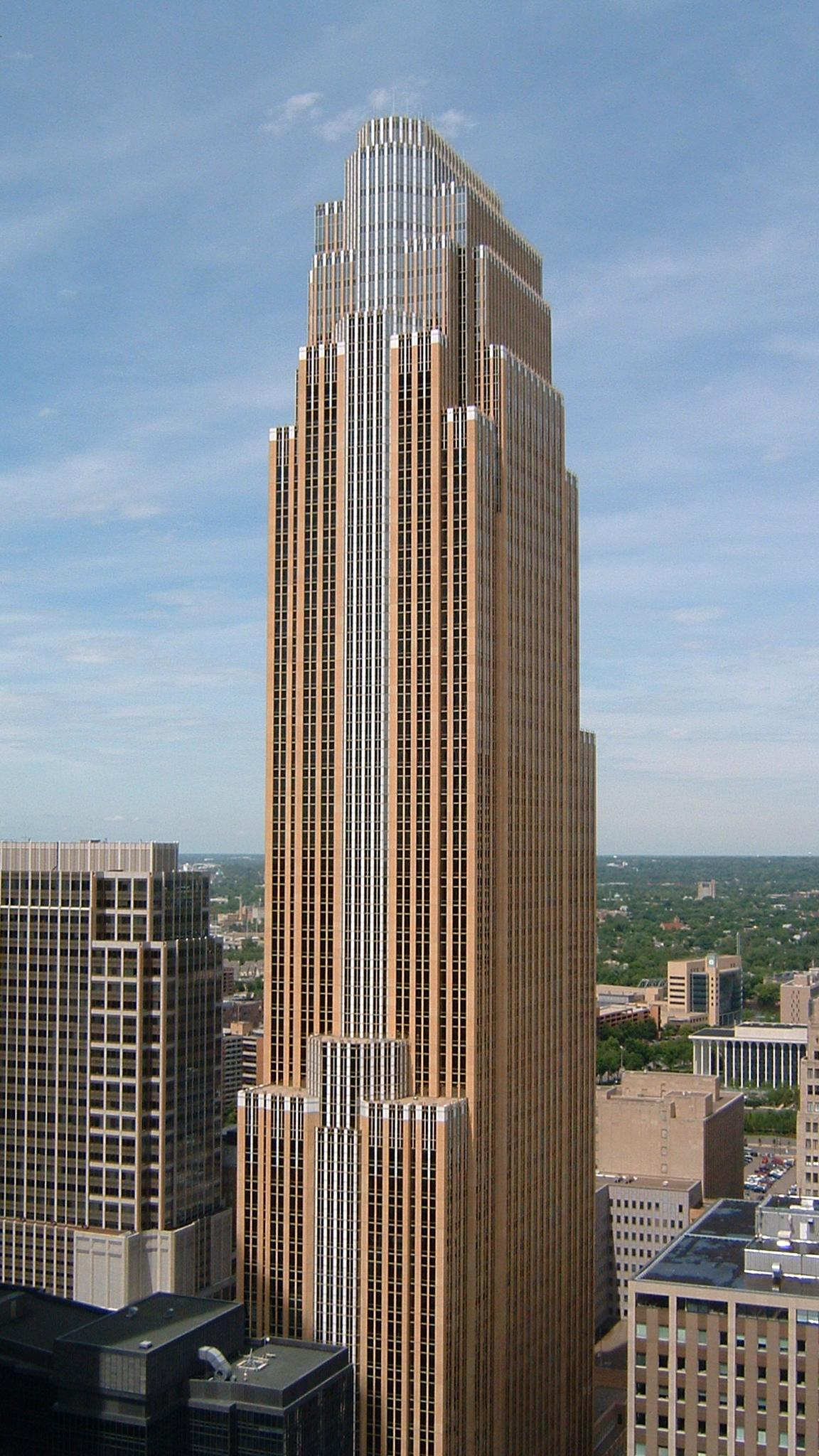
- The Wells Fargo Center in 2005
- Interactive map of the Wells Fargo Center area
- Former names: Norwest Center

General information
- Status: Completed
- Type: Office
- Architectural style: Art deco Postmodernism
- Location: 90 South Seventh Street; Minneapolis, Minnesota
- Coordinates: 44°58′37″N 93°16′15″W
- Construction started: 1986; 40 years ago
- Completed: 1988; 38 years ago
- Opening: 1988; 38 years ago
- Owner: Equity Office Properties Trust

Height
- Architectural: 775 ft (236.2 m)
- Tip: 775 ft (236.2 m)
- Roof: 775 ft (236.2 m)

Technical details
- Material: Glass; Steel; Stone
- Floor count: 57 (56 occupied)
- Floor area: 1,105,249 ft^{2} (102,681.0 m^{2})
- Lifts/elevators: 27

Design and construction
- Architects: César Pelli; César Pelli & Associates Architects
- Developer: Hines Interests Limited Partnership
- Structural engineer: CBM Engineers
- Main contractor: Schal Associates, Inc.

Website
- www.wellsfargocenter.com

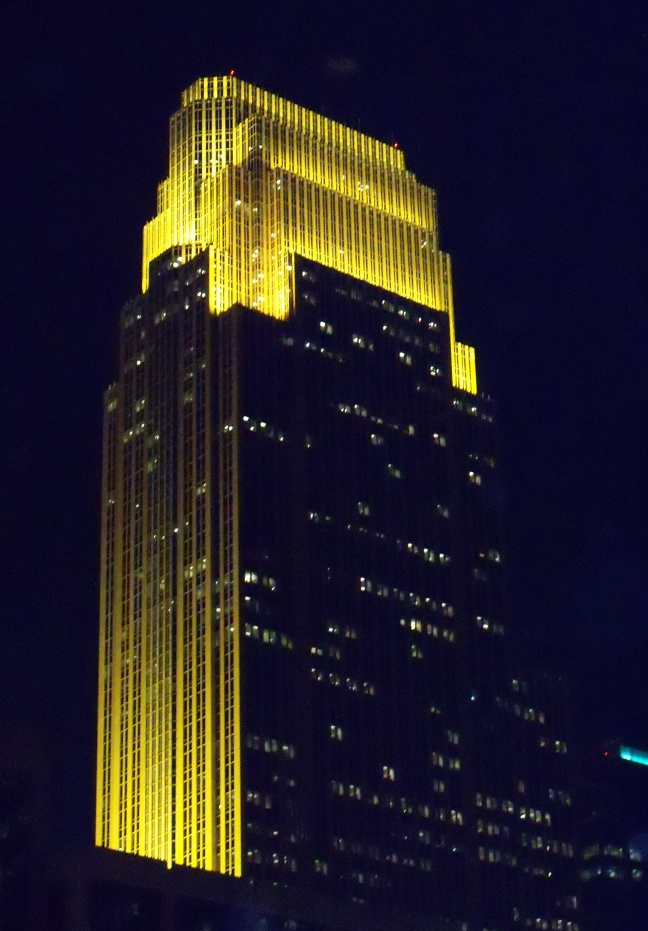
The Wells Fargo Center at night, with its brightly lit upper floors.

The Wells Fargo Center (90 South 7th St), formerly known as Norwest Center, is the third-tallest building in Minneapolis, Minnesota, after the IDS Center and the Capella Tower. Completed in 1988, it is 774 feet (236 m) tall. For many years, this was believed to be one foot shorter than Capella, but that structure actually had a different height (see the Capella Tower article for details). Norwest Center was designed with a modernized art deco style by César Pelli, reflecting nearby structures such as the nearby CenturyLink Building and the Foshay Tower, which is several blocks away. It is also considered by many to be a homage to 30 Rockefeller Plaza in New York City.

Wells Fargo Center sits on the site of the old Northwestern National Bank Building, which was damaged in a fire in 1982 and imploded two years later. The original design called for a 45-story tower with a square footprint that would have been crowned the tallest building in Minneapolis; however, the site was halved in size, requiring the building's design to be changed to what it is today. Northwestern National, renamed Norwest Corporation, maintained its headquarters here. Despite Norwest's adoption of the Wells Fargo identity after acquiring the latter and moving to San Francisco in 1998, significant regional operations are still maintained in this building. Other major tenants include the law firm of Faegre Drinker and the local office of accounting firm KPMG.

It is lit from sunset through midnight by floodlights pointing up from the setback rooftops, illuminating the sides of the building's upper floors. Despite this, it is still much more energy efficient than the previous building and in 2000, it was recognized by the United States Environmental Protection Agency as one of the 100 most energy efficient buildings in the US. In 1989, the building was praised by the Urban Land Institute, which honored it with its Award for Excellence in Large Scale Office Development. It is located at 90 South 7th Street. Gaviidae Common, a neighboring shopping center, was also designed by Pelli and built at the same time.

A branch of the Wells Fargo History Museum was located in the skyway level. The museum's exhibits included an 1863 stagecoach, telegraph equipment, gold nuggets and coins. It closed in September 2020.

As of April 2019, Starwood Capital Group acquired Wells Fargo Center for $315 million. The sellers were Hines and Blackstone.

In December of 2024, it was announced the building would be sold again, this time to Onward Investors. The sale price of $85 million represents a 70% decrease in value since the 2019 sale.

== Broadcasting ==
=== FM ===
FM radio stations
Frequency	Call sign	Name	Format	Owner
92.9	W225AP (KTCZ-FM HD-2 Translator)	Air1	Contemporary Christian	iHeartMedia
94.9	W235CT (WREY-AM Translator)	Radio Rey	Regional Mexican	Borgen Broadcasting

== See also ==
- List of tallest buildings in Minnesota
