= Deborah Sussman =

American environmental graphic designer

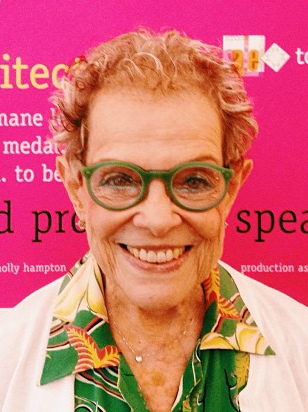
- Sussman in 2013
- Born: Deborah Sussman; May 26, 1931; Brooklyn, New York, U.S.
- Died: August 20, 2014 (aged 83); Los Angeles, California, U.S.
- Education: Black Mountain College (Summer 1948); BFA, visual arts and acting, Bard College, (1948–1950); Institute of Design, Chicago (1950–1959); Hochschule für Gestaltung, Ulm, Germany (1957–1958); Doctorate of Humane Letters, Bard College (1998)
- Known for: Environmental graphic design
- Notable work: 1984 Summer Olympics
- Awards: AIGA medal (2004)
- Website: Official website

Deborah Sussman (May 26, 1931 – August 20, 2014) was an American designer and a pioneer in the field of environmental graphic design. Her work incorporated graphic design into architectural and public spaces.

== Early life and education ==
Deborah Sussman was born in Brooklyn, New York on May 26, 1931. Her father worked as a skilled commercial artist.

Sussman took classes at the Art Students League and attended summer school at Black Mountain College in 1952. She studied acting and painting at Bard College in New York. In 1951 she attended the Institute of Design in Chicago that was established in 1939 by Bauhaus painter and photographer László Moholy-Nagy (1895–1946), where she earned a degree in graphic design. She went on to earn a Doctorate of Humane Letters from Bard College in 1998.

== Career ==
In 1953, Sussman began her career in the offices of Charles and Ray Eames, where she worked as an office designer. She worked for approximately 10 years with the Eameses, and during the course of that decade, she worked as art director for the office, designing print materials, museum exhibits, films, and showrooms for furniture. Sussman designed instructions for the card construction game House of Cards and traveled to Mexico to document folk culture for the Eameses' 1957 film Day of the Dead. She won a Fulbright Scholarship that allowed her to study at the Ulm School of Design in Germany.

In 1968, Sussman started her own practice. Four years later, in 1972, she met and married architect and urban planner Paul Prejza. Sussman and Prejza formed the firm Sussman/Prejza & Co. in 1980 in Santa Monica, before moving to Culver City, in 1986. Their "urban branding" projects included city identities for Philadelphia and Santa Monica, as well as the look and architectural landscape of the 1984 Summer Olympics in Los Angeles.

In 1983, Sussman helped found the AIGA chapter of Los Angeles with Saul Bass and others.

In Stylepedia, authors Steven Heller and Louise Fili wrote that the graphical elements of that Olympics "epitomized a carnivalesque modernity" and placed the work in the Pacific branch of the New Wave design movement. The firm also designed Hasbro's New York facility, and has worked with the City of Santa Monica, the Museum of the African Diaspora, Disney World, and McCaw Hall. The company was later renamed Sussman-Prejza.

Sussman was known for her bold and colorful work that includes an integration of typography in the environmental landscape. She was awarded an AIGA medal in 2004. In 2013 the WUHO Gallery hosted the first retrospective of Deborah Sussman's early work, spanning her days at Eames Studio up to the 1984 Olympics.

Sussman was named a Fellow at the Society for Experimental Graphic Design in 1991, and she was recognized with SEGD's Golden Arrow Award in 2006. In 1995, she became the first woman to exhibit in New York’s School of Visual Arts’ “Master Series”.

Her archives (1931–1968) are owned by the Getty Research Institute.

== Work ==
=== 1984 Olympic Games ===
Before Sussman became involved, the 1984 Olympic design consisted of a red, white, and blue "star-in-motion" logo that was considered inappropriate because of its nationalistic expression of the United States. Sussman and her designers, along with the Los Angeles Olympic Organizing Committee, decided a new logo should express the culture of Los Angeles and Southern California‍—‌particularly Mexico, Japan, Indonesia, and India. By combining the traditional elements of the U.S. flag with new colors and forms, they achieved what architect Jon Jerde referred to as "Festive Federalism." In total, there were 150 designs creating the visual language for the 1984 games. This work won Time magazine's award for "Best of the Decade."

=== Other design contributions ===
- Identity and branding applications for the Gas Company of Southern California
- Wayfinding systems for Walt Disney Resorts
- Wayfinding systems for Philadelphia
- Seattle Opera
- McCaw Hall
- Exhibit design for the Museum of the African Diaspora
- City of Santa Monica
- Big Blue Bus
- Designed the identity of the Cleveland Cavaliers in 1993
- Citadel, City of Commerce CA along with Nadel Parteners, Peridian Group, Martha Schwartz

== Death ==
Sussman died of breast cancer at the age of 83 on August 19, 2014.
