= Capella Tower =

Office tower in Minneapolis, Minnesota, US

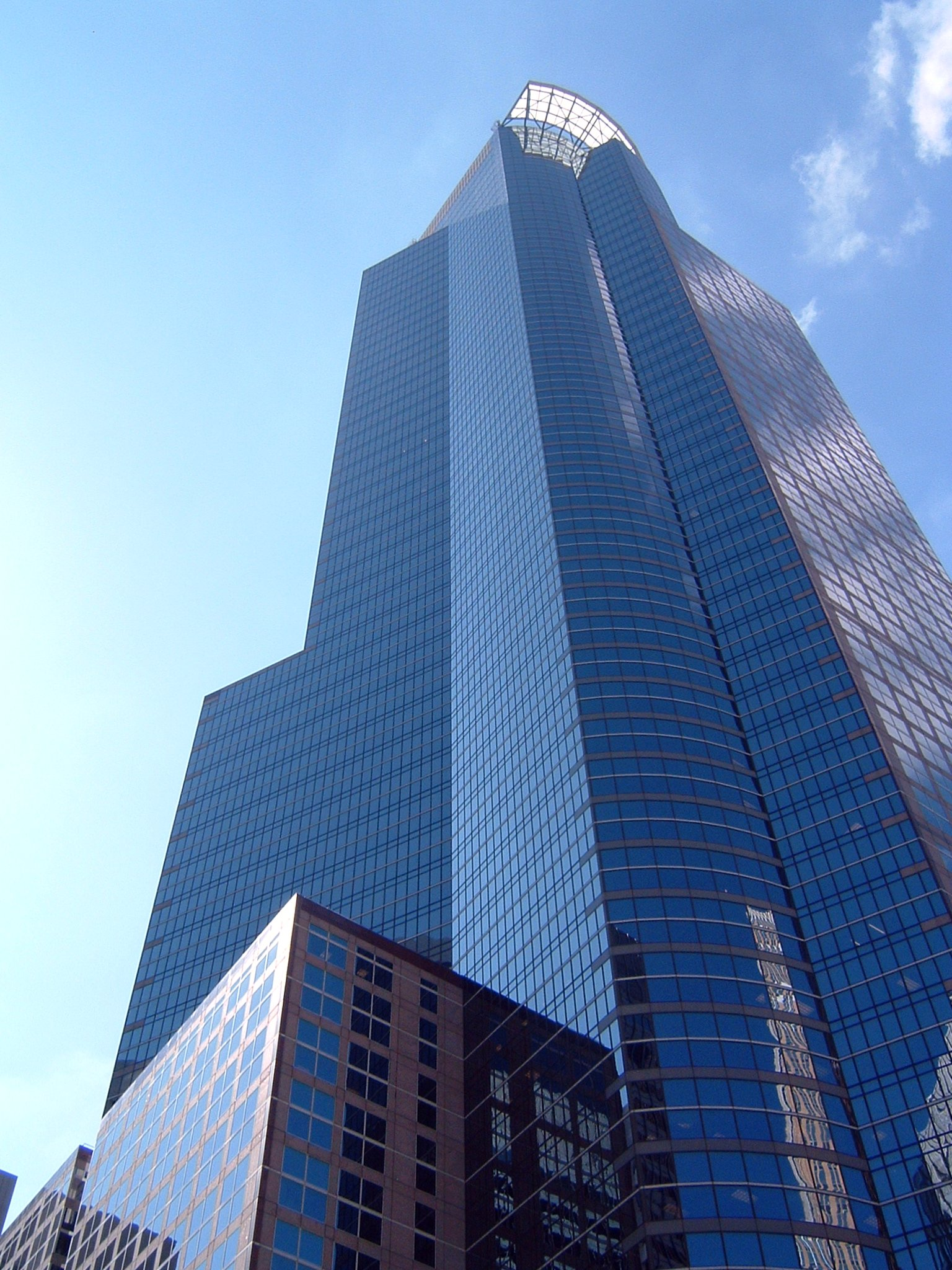
- Capella Tower seen from the ground in 2005
- Former names: First Bank Place (1992–1997); US Bancorp Place (1997–2000); 225 South Sixth (2000–2009)
- Alternative names: 225 South Sixth

General information
- Status: Completed
- Location: 225 6th Street S. Minneapolis, Minnesota, US
- Coordinates: 44°58′35″N 93°16′07″W
- Construction started: 1989; 37 years ago
- Completed: 1992; 34 years ago
- Operator: Shorenstein Realty Services

Height
- Roof: 775 ft (236 m)

Technical details
- Floor count: 56 (53 occupied)
- Floor area: 1,499,994 ft^{2} (139,354.0 m^{2})

Design and construction
- Architects: James Ingo Freed; Pei Cobb Freed & Partners
- Developer: Joint Venture of IBM Corporation and The OPUS Corporation
- Structural engineer: CBM Engineers Inc. Cosentini Associates

Website
- www.capellatowerat225.com

Capella Tower (also 225 South Sixth) is an office skyscraper in Minneapolis, Minnesota, United States. The building opened in 1992 as First Bank Place, replacing One Financial Plaza as the headquarters for First Bank System. In 1997, First Bank System acquired US Bancorp and changed the name of the building to US Bancorp Place. The headquarters of US Bancorp moved into the US Bancorp Center in 2000, whereupon the tower changed to 225 South 6th Street. In March 2009, the building took its present name.

Capella Tower is connected to the Minneapolis Skyway System and has 1.4 million square feet (130,000 m^{2}). of office space.

== History ==
Capella Tower was originally announced in October 1989. The complex was unveiled as two towers, one 53-story tall building belonging to First Bank System, and a smaller, 18-story tall building for IBM to be known as First Bank Place. The building would become the headquarters of First Bank System and regional offices for IBM's Minnesota and North Dakota operations. Designed by New York-based firm I.M. Pei, it was the group's first skyscraper in the Twin Cities area. The original design was noted for having a 14-story cylinder tying the complex together.

Additionally, First Bank Place was intentionally designed to be exactly one foot shorter than IDS Center, the tallest building in Minneapolis. Construction for First Bank Place began in August 1989. A five-story glass atrium was added to the side of the IBM part of the complex, bringing the size of the building to 1,400,000 square feet (130,000 m^{2}). By July 1991, the building was 66% leased. Construction was officially completed in 1992 and the building officially opened later that year. In 1997, First Bank System acquired the Oregon-based U.S. Bancorp and re-branded under the name. Following this, First Bank Place was re-branded to US Bancorp Place. In 2000, U.S. Bancorp moved its headquarters to the nearby U.S. Bancorp Center.

In March 2008, Capella Education Co., longtime occupant of the building and owner of the for-profit online Capella University, signed a lease that changed the name of the tower to Capella Tower. The new lease expands Capella's square footage in the building from 203,000 sq ft (18,900 m^{2}) to about 400,000 sq ft (37,000 m^{2}), making it the largest tenant in the building. The expanded facility houses all of the company's 1,150 downtown Minneapolis employees; as the online school does not have classrooms, the space houses administrative staff and faculty. The name change took place in March 2009.

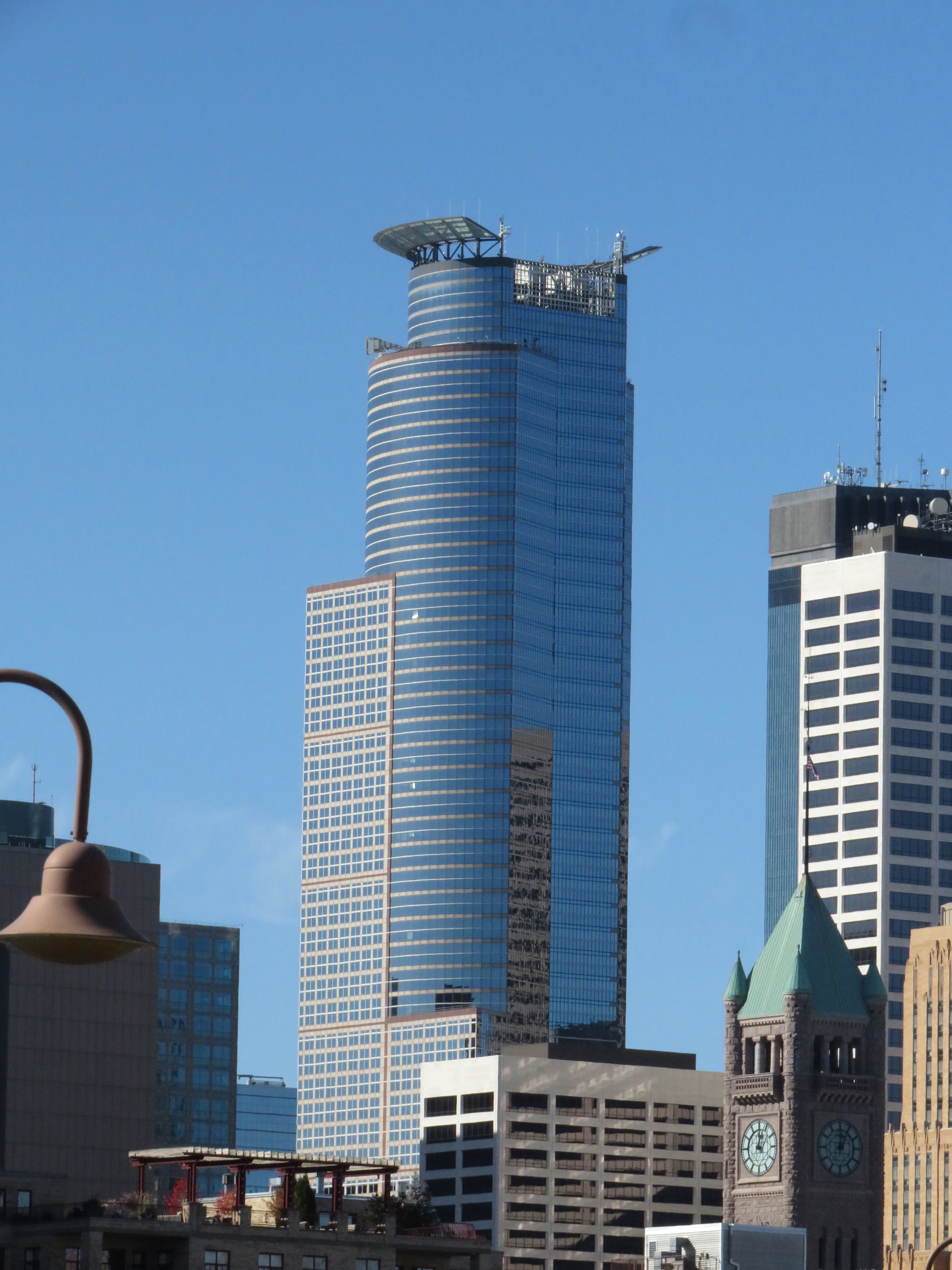
The Capella Tower, as viewed from the Stone Arch Bridge in Minneapolis.

== Design ==
The office building, designed by Pei, Cobb, Freed & Partners, is laid out on an L-shaped site with the 58-story tower connected to the 20-story Star Tribune Building by an atrium. The building combines six-story cubes and various round towers which echo the different styles of buildings in downtown Minneapolis. The illuminated semicircle located atop the tower is not only decorative but also houses an antenna farm and communications network. This feature has given the building the nickname the "Halo Building".

== Tenants ==
- Winthrop & Weinstine, P.A.
- Baker Tilly
- Houlihan Lokey
- Morgan Stanley
- Capella University

== See also ==
- List of tallest buildings in Minnesota
- List of tallest buildings in the United States
