= Minneapolis Skyway System =

Pedestrian walkway system in downtown Minneapolis, Minnesota

Coordinates: 44°58′35″N 93°16′15″W

- Builder: Leslie Park
- Length: 9.5 miles (15.3 km)
- Owner: Individual buildings
- Location: Downtown Minneapolis, Minnesota, USA
- Interactive map of Minneapolis Skyway System

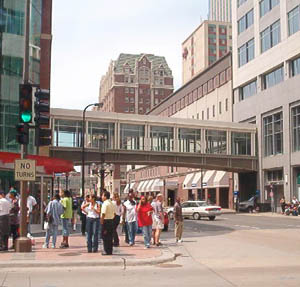
Minneapolis skyway

Voice of America report on the Minneapolis Skyway System

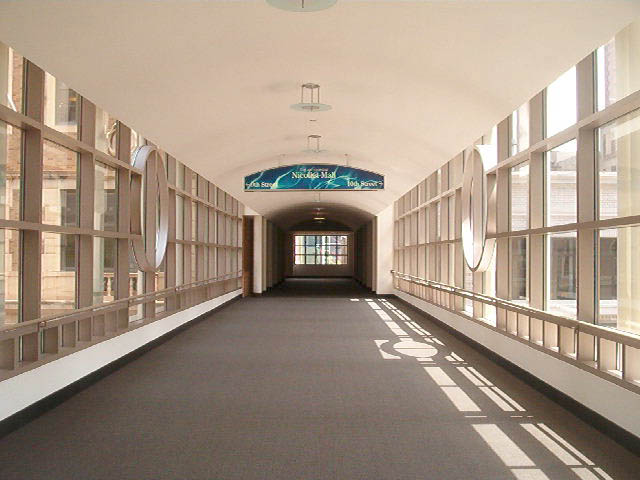
Skyway interior, Minneapolis. Nicollet Mall between 9th and 10th streets

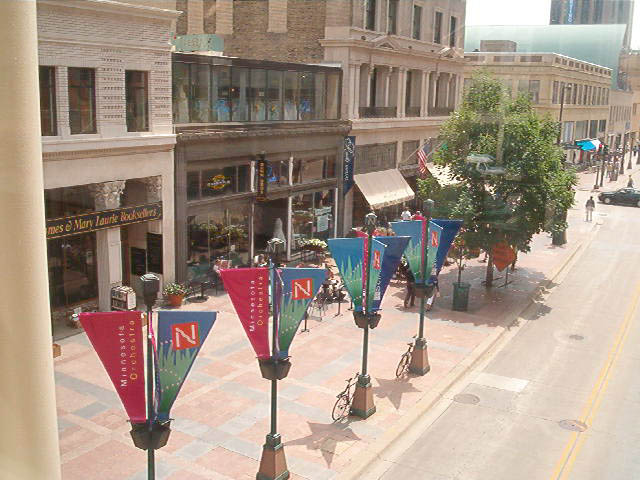
View through window, Minneapolis

The Minneapolis Skyway System is an interlinked collection of enclosed pedestrian footbridges that connect various buildings in 80 full city blocks over 9.5 miles (15.3 km) of Downtown Minneapolis, enabling people to walk in climate-controlled comfort year-round. The skyways are owned by individual buildings in Minneapolis, and as such they do not have uniform opening and closing times. The 9.5 miles of skyway are comparable to the Houston tunnel system, the systems in Canadian cities such as Toronto's PATH, Montreal's Underground City, Calgary's 11-mile Plus 15 system and the 8-mile Edmonton Pedway system.

The Minneapolis skyways connect the second or third floors of various office towers, hotels, banks, corporate and government offices, restaurants, and retail stores to the Nicollet Mall shopping district, the Mayo Clinic Square, and the sports facilities at Target Center, Target Field and U.S. Bank Stadium. Several condominium and apartment complexes are skyway-connected as well, allowing residents to live, work, and shop downtown without having to leave the skyway system.

== History and development ==
The city's first skyways were planned by real estate developer Leslie Park and his architect Edward Baker (Baker Associates) in the early 1960s and built by Crown Iron Works Company of Minneapolis. Sensing pressure from indoor shopping malls such as Southdale Center, Park wanted to create a similar environment in Downtown Minneapolis that would offer a climate-controlled space and a way for pedestrians to move from building to building. He built two skyways connecting the newly constructed Northstar Center building to the Northwestern Bank Building and the Roanoke Building. The skyway to the Northwestern Bank Building was built in 1962 and the skyway to the Roanoke Building followed the next year. The second skyway still remains in use today and is the system's oldest segment.

The system grew to seven total segments by 1972, though many of the skyways remained disconnected from one another. The construction of the IDS Center in 1972 helped to unify the system. The building featured skyways in all four directions as well as a spacious atrium area called the Crystal Court, allowing it to act as a central hub for the entire system. In 1976, the Downtown Council produced the first formal maps and signage for the system.

The 1987 album Pleased to Meet Me by The Replacements contained a song entitled Skyway. Inspired by Minneapolis, the song used the skyway as a metaphor for unrequited love.

In 2016, the U.S. Bank Stadium became connected to the Minneapolis skyway via a mixed-use development of office buildings and apartment complexes in Downtown East, Minneapolis.

== Notable buildings connected ==
- Fifth Street Towers
- Butler Square
- IDS Center
- Northstar Center
- Foshay Tower
- U.S. Bank Stadium
- Target Center
- Target Field
- Hawthorne Transportation Center
- Mayo Clinic Square
- Minneapolis Central Library
- Minneapolis Convention Center
- University of St. Thomas
- Capella Tower
- Wells Fargo Center
- 33 South Sixth/Minneapolis City Center
- Two22 (formerly Campbell Mithun Tower)
- Ameriprise Financial Center
- Hennepin County Government Center
- US Bank Plaza
- RBC Plaza
- US Bancorp Center
- AT&T Tower
- 100 Washington Square
- 510 Marquette Building
- Rand Tower

== Guides ==
Various guides to navigation exist including official paper and online maps as well unofficial community maps, such as Skyway.run
