= 33 South Sixth =

Skyscraper in Minneapolis, Minnesota, U.S.

33 South Six Tower
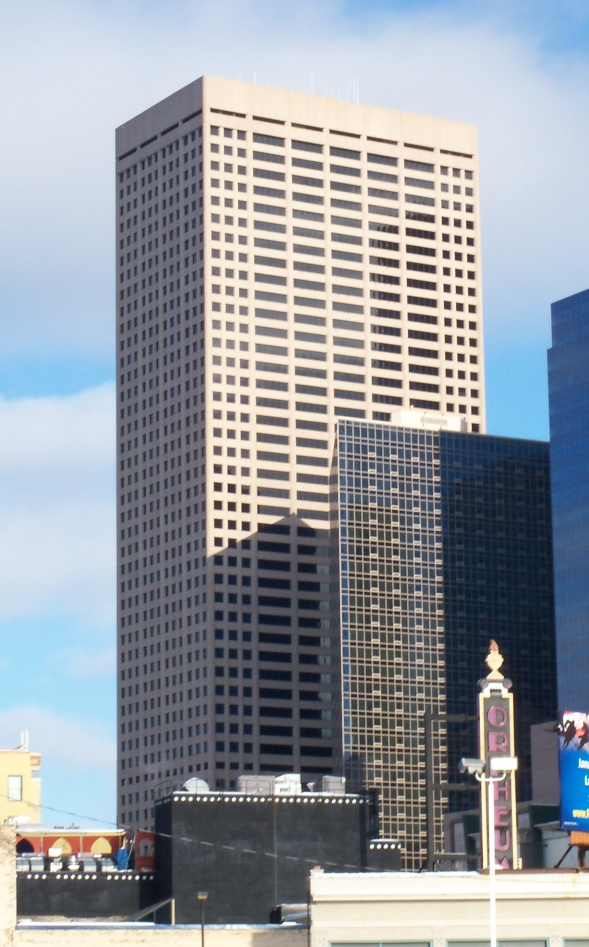
- Former names: International Multifoods Tower
- Alternative names: City Center Mall

General information
- Location: 33 South Sixth Street, Minneapolis, Minnesota, U.S.
- Coordinates: 44°58′41″N 93°16′22″W
- Current tenants: Target Corporation, Bassford Remele, Korn/Ferry International, P&G, Stoel Rives, Meagher & Geer,
- Construction started: 1979; 47 years ago
- Completed: 1983; 43 years ago
- Owner: City Center 33 South Property (Samsung)

Height
- Height: 668 ft (204 m)

Technical details
- Floor count: 52
- Floor area: 1,082,096 sq ft (100,530.0 m^{2})

Design and construction
- Architecture firm: Skidmore, Owings and Merrill
- Main contractor: PCL Constructions Eastern

33 South Sixth, formerly known as International Multifoods Tower, is a skyscraper in Minneapolis, Minnesota, United States. It was designed by Skidmore, Owings and Merrill and stands 52 stories tall at 668 ft (204 m). Its name comes from its address: 33 South Sixth Street, Minneapolis. It was completed in 1983 as headquarters for International Multifoods Corporation, which occupied the structure until 1997 when it moved to suburban Wayzata. Although the corporate offices relocated, the name remained until 2003 under the terms of its lease. Adjacent to the tower is the Minneapolis City Center shopping mall, which occupies the ground level, skyway, and third levels.

== Description ==
33 South Sixth Street is a 52-story office building located in the heart of Minneapolis's 64-square block skyway system. Construction on the building began in 1981 and it opened in 1983 as one of the tallest buildings in Minneapolis. Current tenants include Target Corporation, and law firms Meagher & Geer, and Stoel Rives. The typical floors are 24,700 sq ft (2,290 m^{2}) for a total of 1,170,000 sq ft (109,000 m^{2}) of office space and 489,000 sq ft (45,400 m^{2}) in the retail mall.

The attached Minneapolis City Center consists of a retail mall, renovated in 2005, with five skyway connections, the Minneapolis Marriott at City Center, a 583-room full-service four plus star hotel, and a 687-stall parking garage. The mall is anchored by Saks Fifth Avenue Off Fifth, Marshalls, and Fogo de Chao. The mall also includes a mix of national retail and restaurant tenants including Brooks Brothers, Allen Edmonds, General Nutrition Center, UPS, Leeann Chin, Naf Naf, and others located on the first two floors. Local retailers include Len (casual men's and women's fashion boutique), Pacifier (luxury infant and toddler apparel and toys), along with others.

Sports Authority announced in May 2016 that it would be shuttering all of its US stores, leaving City Center with a large vacancy on the corner of 7th Street and Nicollet Avenue in August 2016.

Rosa Mexicano quietly shuttered its downtown Minneapolis location at Hennepin Avenue and 6th Street in November 2016. A new tenant has been in the works to fill that corner anchor space.

The exterior of the building is faced with precast concrete panels tinted light brown. The east and west facades consist of four wide bays, divided by pilasters that extend to become the spandrel panels. Each wide bay is further divided into three smaller bays with a square window. The north and south facades consist of seven bays with only the first and last being divided. The five central bays are wider with dark-tinted glass set into dark frames. The precast panels extend to cover the retail pod, which does little to make the structure more visually appealing, and might even do it a disservice by making it appear more bulky than it really is. Architecture critic Larry Millett calls it a "big architectural oaf" and adds that the precast concrete panel cladding is "designed, quite successfully, to achieve maximum unattractiveness."

The design of the tower is very similar to One HSBC Center in Buffalo.

== Additional facts ==
- The exterior facade continues into the City Center atrium, and lower level offices on the building's south side directly overlook the shopping center.
- The former Multifoods Tower is located in the heart of Minneapolis's 64-square block skyway system.
- 33 South Sixth is the tallest building in Minneapolis west of Nicollet Mall.
- Former tenants include the now-defunct law firm of Rider Bennett.
- It was built on the site formerly occupied by the Hotel Dyckman.
- The building has a view of Target Field.
- In November 2012, the Shorenstein Company acquired the building from Brookfield Office Properties for a reported $205.5 million. The Chinese insurer HNA Group acquired in 2016 for $315 million. In 2018, HNA sold the property to an entity controlled by Samsung for $320 million.
- Since 1985, peregrine falcons have roosted in a hack box on the 51st floor of the building.

== See also ==
- World's tallest structures contains other discussions about height disputes
- List of tallest buildings in Minnesota
