= Park and Shop Ramp =

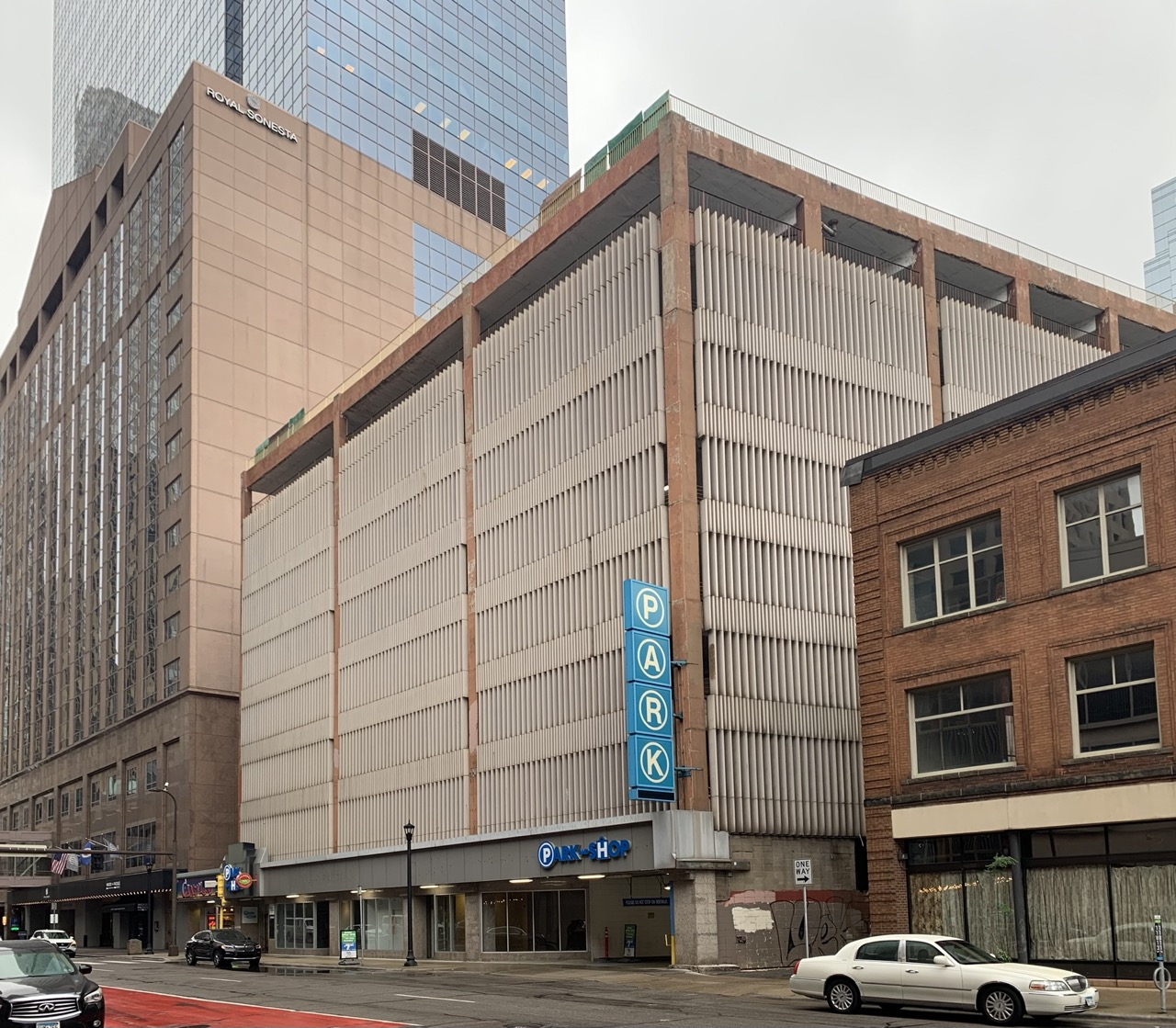
- The northern facade of the Park and Shop Ramp in August 2023
- Interactive map of the Park and Shop Ramp area
- Former names: Dayton Radisson Ramp

General information
- Type: Parking and retail
- Location: Minneapolis, Minnesota, United States, 27 7th Street South and 24 8th Street South
- Coordinates: 44.977°N 93.2746°W
- Opened: September 3, 1959
- Owner: 601W Companies

Technical details
- Floor count: 9

Design and construction
- Architecture firm: Larson and McLaren
- Developer: Eighth Street Development Corporation
- Structural engineer: Enco Engineering
- Main contractor: Kraus-Anderson, Inc.

The Park and Shop Ramp (originally the Dayton Radisson Ramp) is a parking garage located in Downtown West, Minneapolis between 7th and 8th Streets. It is adjoined to the Dayton's flagship store building and PwC Plaza, and primarily supports the users of those two structures, in addition to Target Center and businesses along Hennepin Avenue. The parking ramp was announced in June 1958, along with the news of demolition for several buildings in its proposed space, and ultimately opened in September 1959. It expanded in 1963, adding another tier of parking and an exhibition hall for the Dayton's store. In total, the structure features 9 stories with 910 parking spaces and a spiral ramp tower in its center, connecting two sides of the ramp. Its alternating level design was the first garage of its kind in the United States.

The first floor of the Park and Shop Ramp contains commercial spaces and a retail corridor, referred to as the Arcade Shops. Since 2020, the building has seen higher tenant vacancies, and has been marketed as a part of the Dayton's complex. Stores throughout the ramp's existence have included local eateries and chains such as Candyland, Foot Locker, and Haskell's.

== Site ==
The Dayton Radisson Ramp originated as an alternative to the existing Radisson Ramp, that served automobiles along 7th Street in Minneapolis, primarily the customers of the adjacent Dayton's department store and the original Radisson Hotel to the east. The former Radisson Ramp was located in between Minneapolis' Nankin Cafe restaurant and the Radisson Hotel. In order to facilitate the Dayton Radisson Ramp project, the original Nankin Cafe and three surrounding structures used as storage facilities for Dayton's would need to be demolished. The Radisson Ramp was also removed to make way for its successor.

== Architecture ==
In June 1958, Dayton's then-president Donald C. Dayton formally announced the construction of the Dayton Radisson Ramp, a multi-tiered parking structure to provide additional and upgraded parking facilities for customers of the Dayton's flagship store and Radisson hotel in Downtown West, Minneapolis. Kraus-Anderson, Inc. served as the general contractor for the project, whose bid for the project was approximately US$1.8 million. Larson and McLaren, a Minneapolis-based architecture firm, designed a plan that featured two, sloped parking decks connected via a spiral tower system, unlike the modern design of horizontal parking decks connected by diagonal ramps at their starts. This allowed for exiting cars to never cross paths for entering cars due to its alternating levels, and was described as a "two-in-one" and "the simplest, most convenient, self-parking ramp" by Dayton's to the public. It was the first parking structure in the United States to feature this design. Other elements of the structure include a lobby with three elevators and a two-story underground delivery and loading facilities for Dayton's. The structure contains 140 feet of street level frontage on 7th Street and 174 feet on 8th Street.

The 7th Street entrance to the Arcade Shops corridor in 2023, and the adjacent Candyland store.

At the time of its completion, it was the second largest parking ramp capacity in the city. It featured six levels of parking with 750 spaces. It also features an exterior envelope consisting of vertically arranged porcelainized metal, and the central ramp tower resembles circular-shaped staircases. Designers of the facilities intentionally laid out the parking ramp with the hope that the adjacent structures to the west would one day become vacant, and the developer could obtain property rights to construct an additional exit. A separate expansion project did occur beginning in 1963, when Dayton's announced they would add another parking tier atop the building with 160 more spaces, and a 17,500-square-foot (1,600 m^{2}) exhibition hall for the store's events and fashion shows. Returning to the site for the project were the original engineering firm, Enco Engineering, and the general contractor Kraus-Anderson, Incorporated. The ramp is made mostly of reinforced concrete, and allowed for a future expansion of up to two more floors. Additionally, the layout was intentionally designed to contain zero interior pillars, removing the possibility for cars to back into concrete posts. Through the building's interior entrances, it is connected to the Minneapolis Skyway System.

Given the ramp's proximity to Dayton's and the Radisson Hotel, it largely relied on their customer bases to fulfill parking spaces. During Dayton's existence, the ramp was especially crowded during sales and holiday events, while in modern times the ramp has been negatively impacted due to nearby office tower vacancies. During the city's annual Holidazzle Parade, the ramp was referred to as the most difficult to find an available space. Due to the overall size of the basement receiving area, Twin Cities Business Magazine's Burl Gilyard has referred to the ramp as "something of a period piece".

== History ==
The center atrium of Arcade Shops at the entrance to the former Dayton's store, directly underneath the ramp's spiral tower.

The new parking structure officially opened on September 3, 1959, bringing new interior entrances to Dayton's, the Radisson Hotel, and its retail atrium, Arcade Shops. Print advertisements for Dayton's boasted that its customers could leave their houses and enter the store through the new garage without stepping foot outside, and that all parking spaces were within 170 feet of the elevator lobby of the store. It operated under lease from the Eighth Street Development Corporation, a subsidiary of Dayton's, led by president M. J. Sanders. 601W Companies own the majority of the structure and ramp, with Sanders owning some of the land it was built on. The ownership deal remained in place during the transition of the Dayton's department store into Macy's, and its eventual closure in 2017, with Sanders' Columbus Corporation serving as the ramp's operator.

The Arcade Shops contains approximately 12,000 square feet (1,100 m^{2}) of retail space on each end of 7th and 8th Streets. The first tenants announced as part of the corridor were Haskell's Liquor, the Finger Tip Beauty Salon, and a maternity store named Shirley's, who all signed their leases in May 1959. The Arcade Shops hosted a grand opening event on December 3, 1959, where nine tenants debuted to the public. Among the stores were the Brother's Deli, Hal's Sportswear, Lee's Candies, and a pharmacy, with all participating in a drawing that would gift one customer a new Ford Falcon automobile during their opening week. Miss Downtown Phyllis Kirk awarded the car to a Minneapolis resident later that weekend.

In 1967, the structure's Seventh Street entrance was temporarily blocked due to construction occurring on the nearby Nicollet Mall, resulting in Dayton's developing advertisements to explain possible detours. In a 1977 Minneapolis Star article, columnist Barbara Flanagan argued that the ramp's entrance location resulted in significant traffic on the corner of 7th Street and Nicollet Mall, and suggested that additional signage be posted to prevent confusion amongst drivers.

The northern Arcade Shops corridor in 2018, approaching the entrance to the former Dayton's store.

In the 1980s, a sidewalk cafe named Center City Cafe operated at the Dayton Radisson Ramp. During that same decade, some residents believed the ramp's rates were too expensive, beginning at US$1.90 for one hour of parking. In reaction, Dayton's and the adjacent City Center shopping mall considered offering parking validation to customers, with the former's general manager remarking: "Up until now, we just haven't considered validating parking. The issue has surfaced and it would be smart for us took at it. I think many retailers in downtown Minneapolis will consider such a system in the next year."

In December 2012, two storefronts formerly leased by a jewelry store and a bakery were combined to form a nail salon named Nail Cops. The tenant is operated by the family of restauranteur Thom Pham, who oversees several neighboring restaurants. In 2017, the adjoining Macy's store permanently closed, decreasing daily traffic at the Park and Shop Ramp. Following the transition of the store into a mixed-use development named the Dayton's Project, the tenants of the Arcade Shops were sometimes marketed as a part of the new project, in addition to some of them being shown as converted into locker rooms and bike storage for office tenants. As a result of the 2020 Minneapolis false rumors riot, the Park and Shop Ramp's Foot Locker store was severely looted. The riot, which was covered in-depth by local publications, also involved an incident where a 26-year-old man burglarized the store, and was later the subject of a lawsuit involving excessive force towards the man by a Minneapolis police officer. By September 2020, only two retailers were leasing space at Arcade Shops, a nail salon and the city's Candyland location.

== See also ==
- Dayton's
- PwC Plaza
