= Kowalski's Markets =

American supermarket chain

- Company type: Private
- Industry: Retail
- Founded: 1983 (43 years ago) in St. Paul, Minnesota
- Headquarters: Woodbury, Minnesota, U.S.
- Number of locations: 11
- Products: Supermarkets
- Website: kowalskis.com

Kowalski's Markets is an American supermarket chain, headquartered in Woodbury, Minnesota. The company opened its first supermarkets on Grand Avenue in St. Paul, Minnesota. It operates 11 stores in the Minneapolis-St. Paul metro area of Minnesota, in addition to a Cub Foods franchise in White Bear Township, Minnesota.

Kowalski's Red Owl Country Store on Grand Avenue in Saint Paul, MN

== History ==
Kowalski's Markets was founded in 1983 by Jim and Mary Anne Kowalski. Their first store consisted of a Red Owl they bought on Grand Avenue in St. Paul. The first Kowalski's Market was introduced in 1986 in White Bear Lake by converting another Red Owl they purchased into the Kowalski's brand. Kowalski's continued its expansion in the Twin Cities and built their first store from the ground up in 2000 in Woodbury, Minnesota. This store would serve as the model for their other stores and would introduce many of Kowalski's staples such as its European theming. Kowalski's would also move their corporate headquarters into the building and it has remained there since.

Kowalski's expanded by acquiring a former Rainbow Foods in Oak Park Heights, Minnesota and converting it into one of their stores. In 2008, Kowalski's built its second store in Eagan, Minnesota. By 2016, they had opened two more stores in Excelsior, Minnesota and another inside a former Rainbow Foods in Shoreview, Minnesota. The Shoreview store is notable for featuring its central bakery, commissary kitchen, meat production facility and transportation facility.

In 2022, Kowalski's launched an updated e-commerce platform in partnership with Mercatus. The company also uses Kowalski's on the go as well as DoorDash and Shipt to fulfil its online delivery service.

In January 2023, it was announced that Kowalski's would be building a new store in Southdale Center in Edina, Minnesota. It will take the place of the first floor of the former Herberger's department store that vacated the space when it went bankrupt in 2016. The store opened on May 30, 2024.

== Timeline of store openings ==
- 1983 St. Paul (Grand Avenue Market) (formerly Red Owl)
- 1986 White Bear Lake (White Bear Lake Market) (formerly Red Owl)
- 1993 White Bear Township (Cub Foods)
- 2000 Woodbury (Woodbury Market) (Headquarters)
- 2002 Minneapolis (Parkview Market)
- 2002 Minneapolis (Lyndale Market)
- 2002 Minneapolis (Uptown Market) (formerly SuperValu)
- 2002 Minneapolis (Camden Market) (Closed in 2005)
- 2004 Eden Prairie (Eden Prairie Market)
- 2005 Lakeville (Closed in 2007)
- 2005 Oak Park Heights (Oak Park Heights Market)
- 2008 Eagan (Eagan Market) (Closed in 2024)
- 2015 Excelsior (Excelsior Market)
- 2016 Shoreview (Shoreview Market) (Central production facility)
- 2024 Edina (Edina Market)

== Planned expansions ==
In 2020, Kowalski's announced it would be taking over part of the former Herberger's department store inside Rosedale Center in Roseville, Minnesota. The demolition occurred in 2021. The site instead is being constructed as a Dick's Sporting Goods which is scheduled to open in 2024.

In December 2023, it was announced that Kowalski's would be building a new store in Ridgedale Center in Minnetonka, Minnesota. It will take the place of the former Sears Auto Center that vacated the space when it went bankrupt in 2018.
