= Donaldson's =

American department store company

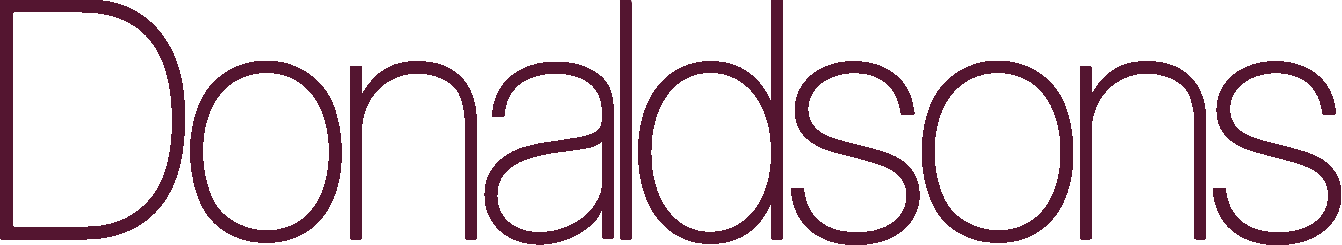
- Type: Department store
- Industry: Retail
- Founded: 1883
- Defunct: 1987
- Fate: Purchased by Carson Pirie Scott
- Headquarters: Minneapolis, Minnesota
- Products: Clothing, footwear, bedding, furniture, jewelry, toys, records, beauty products, and housewares.

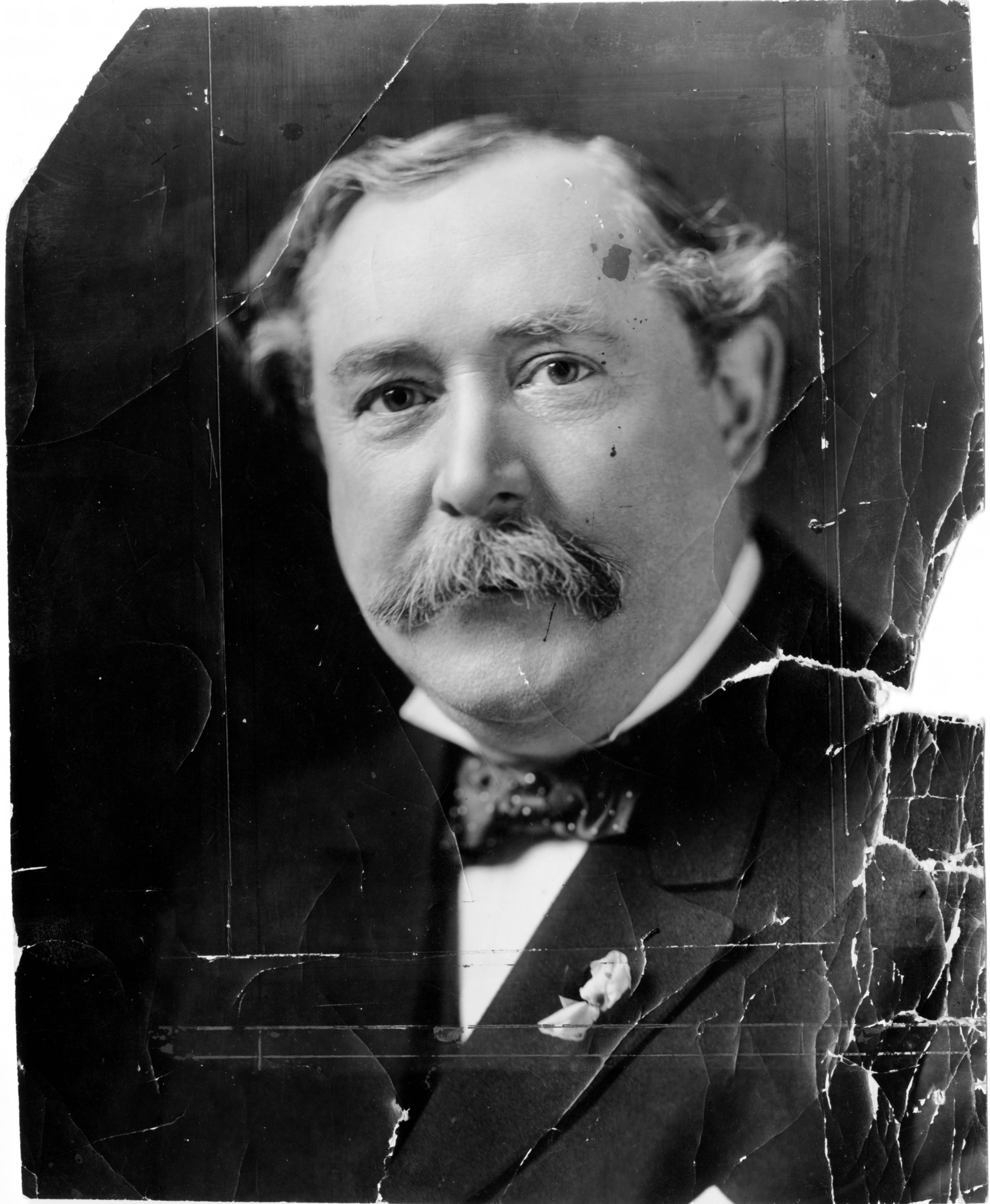
Lawrence S. Donaldson

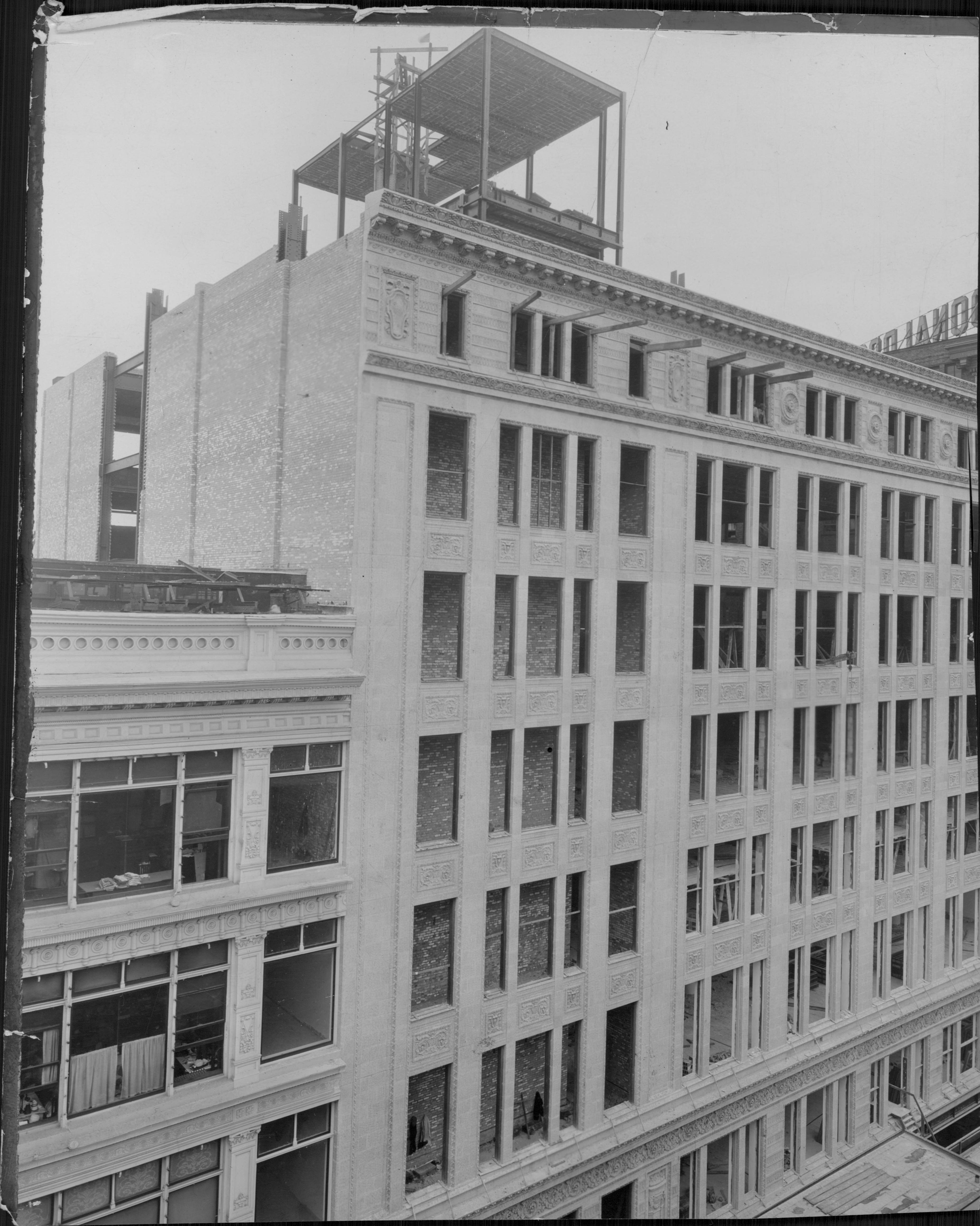
L. S. Donaldson Company Store (1924)

Donaldson's, previously known as the L. S. Donaldson Company, headquartered in Minneapolis, Minnesota, is a defunct department store company.

== History ==
Scottish immigrant William Donaldson opened a small store in Minneapolis in 1881, located at 310 Nicollet Avenue. In 1883, William and his brother Lawrence purchased a 1 1/2-story store named Colton and Company, featuring a large expanse of glass block. The Donaldson brothers department store was known in its early years as "Donaldson's Glass Block Store" because of this distinctive design feature. In 1888, the original building was demolished, and replaced with a five-story building featuring a dome on top, elevators, and rows of plate glass windows. By 1899, William had died, and Lawrence renamed the company the "L.S. Donaldson Company". The store continued to expand, which culminated in the construction of a new $2,000,000 (~$61.2 million in 2024) eight-story building, taking up an entire block of Nicollet from Sixth Street to Seventh Street, topped by the distinctive dome from 1888. The new store opened to great fanfare November 10, 1924. The dome was eventually dismantled in April 1942, and turned into war materials during the Second World War.

Lawrence Donaldson had remained as president of L.S. Donaldson Company until his death in 1924. Dying just 4 months before the opening of the new store in Minneapolis, Lawrence Donaldson didn't live to see the store he had dreamed of and envisioned. He was succeeded by Joseph Chapman as president. In an effort to further expand and have greater buying power, while retaining their management and name, L.S. Donaldson Company merged with Hahn Department Stores Inc. in 1928. In 1935, Hahn's recapitalization plans resulted in a name change; and Hahn Department Stores Inc became known as Allied Stores Corporation.

=== Expansion ===
Donaldson's continued to expand after being acquired by Allied Stores, including their first branch store located in Rapid City, South Dakota, which opened in the former C.C. Anderson building in January 1948. A second branch followed in Rochester, Minnesota, opening October 15, 1953.

In 1961, The Golden Rule store of St. Paul, Minnesota was transferred by Allied Stores to Donaldson's, and operated as Donaldson's - Golden Rule. By April 1965, Donaldson's advertising for the St Paul store dropped the Golden Rule name, and became known as Donaldson's.

Donaldson's continued to expand; and by 1976 Donaldson's had stores in both Minneapolis and St. Paul, as well as in the Twin Cities suburbs, including Southdale Center, Brookdale Center, Rosedale Center and Ridgedale Center.

In 1978, Donaldson's parent company, Allied Stores, transferred control of the three-store James Black Company chain of Waterloo, Iowa to Donaldson's, further expanding the chain.

Donaldson's announced in 1977 that they would be relocating from their flagship store in Minneapolis, on the east side of Nicollet, for the new City Center development across Nicollet. Additionally, Donaldson's updated their marketing plan, closed their budget store, and relocated from the old Golden Rule building to a newly constructed St. Paul store under the guidance of president Charles B. James II in 1980. Allied Stores promoted Charles B. James II to their Joske's division in 1981, and appointed 37 year old William Murray as president of Donaldson's. Prior to the opening of the new Minneapolis location, and just 11 months after being named president, William Murray died of cancer; Leonard Snyder was named the new president. The Minneapolis City Center Donaldson's opened August 1982. At that time the downtown location was third in sales in the chain, behind Southdale Center and Brookdale Center.

The vacated Donaldson's store complex, which comprised half a city block, along with the adjacent Northwestern National Bank Building, burned in the 1982 Thanksgiving Day Fire as a result of arson. The fire caused 75 million dollars in damage, and was the most destructive fire in the history of Minneapolis. Two juveniles were charged with setting fire to the building while it was undergoing demolition; however, charges were later dropped. The sites were replaced and are currently occupied by Gaviidae Common on the Donaldson's tract, and Wells Fargo Center (the successor to Northwestern National Bank/Norwest) on the bank property.

In 1985, Allied Stores acquired a struggling Twin Cities rival, The Powers Dry Goods Company, from Associated Dry Goods Corp. Acquiring 6 of the 7 area Powers stores (the downtown Minneapolis store was sold to a real estate firm) gave Donaldson's some breathing room against dominant rival Dayton's by increasing Donaldson's retail footprint in the Twin Cities by 40%, bringing Donaldson's store count in the area to 12.

=== Carson Pirie Scott & Co. ===
In January 1987, after Campeau Corp.'s buy-out of Allied Stores Corp., Campeau needed to sell 15 of Allied's 24 retail properties in order to pay off the $1.1 billion (~$2.6 billion in 2024) dollar debt incurred in the takeover. Campeau announced in February 1987 that Donaldson's was one of the retail properties for sale. However, in May 1987 it was reported that possibly Donaldson's sale was postponed, as there hadn't been a buyer willing to pay the $190 (~$449 million in 2024) Million being asked by Campeau. Additionally, Donaldson's had just completed the most profitable first quarter in the company's history. August 1987 it was announced Donaldson's was acquired by Carson Pirie Scott & Co. of Chicago, Illinois for $163.5 Million; and the Donaldson's name was permanently changed to Carson Pirie Scott & Co. in April 1988, 107 years after the first Donaldson's store opened.

Less than two years after Carson's acquiring Donaldson's, Carson's in turn was acquired by P.A. Bergner & Co. of Milwaukee, Wisconsin (and formerly of Peoria, Illinois) in May 1989, in a deal in excess of $450 million (~$988 million in 2024). Bergner itself filed for Chapter 11 bankruptcy in August 1991, two years after acquiring Carson's. In cost cutting moves, it announced that the flagship store in downtown Minneapolis would close in May 1992 (10 years after opening); and the store in St. Paul would close in July 1992 (12 years after opening)

Bergner emerged from bankruptcy in August 1993, and took Carson's name. October 1993, Carson's closed two more stores in the Twin Cities, Highland Park in St. Paul, and Knollwood in St. Louis Park.

=== Closure ===
Carson's closed all Twin Cities area locations of the chain in January 1995, and sold the spaces to Dayton's' parent Dayton Hudson Corp. Many of these locations were valuable mall properties that would have been attractive to Dayton's competitors. In a strategic move, Dayton Hudson opened the first local outlets of its moderate Mervyn's chain at these locations, preventing potential competitors who had little or no local presence, such as Nordstrom from acquiring prime mall sites.

By 2004, after the Dayton's stores had been renamed Marshall Field's and, ultimately, sold by their owner Target Corporation, new owner May Department Stores also acquired the 9 Twin Cities Mervyn's locations—all promptly shuttered—and assumed responsibility for disposing of the real estate. In 2005, May Department Stores was acquired by Federated Stores, which later changed its name to Macy's.

The last former Donaldson's location to close in Minnesota was in Rochester at Miracle Mile. That location continued in operation as Carson Pirie Scott until 2001, when Carson's parent company at that time, Saks, announced Carson's would move to the former Montgomery Ward building. However, when the store opened, it was under the Herberger's name, which was another retail property owned by Saks. As of 2018, the Herberger's chain was liquidated and ceased operations.

== Donaldson's in popular culture ==
When the producers of The Mary Tyler Moore Show were filming Minneapolis exteriors for the opening sequence of the show in March, 1970, the famous hat-toss scene was filmed directly in front of Donaldson's. This can best be verified in the opening scenes—frame by frame—of the shows from the first season. Openings from the show's later seasons deleted most of this footage, but the hat-toss itself remained part of the credits for the entire run of the series.

A statue of Moore was commissioned by the TV Land channel and now stands in front of the entrance to the former Dayton's across the street.
