= Shingle Creek Crossing =

Shopping mall in Hennepin County, Minnesota, U.S.

Brookdale Center
- Location: Brooklyn Center, Minnesota, United States
- Coordinates: 45°03′24″N 93°19′04″W
- Opened: 1962
- Closed: 2010
- Developer: Dayton–Hudson Corporation
- Manager: Brooks Mall Properties
- Num. of anchor tenants: 4
- Website: brookdaleshoppingcenter.com (2010 archive)

Shingle Creek Crossing, formerly Brookdale Center, is a regional shopping mall in Brooklyn Center, Minnesota. It became the third enclosed shopping mall in the Twin Cities, after Southdale Center and Apache Plaza. The mall opened in phases beginning with Phase One in March 1962 which included anchor stores Sears and JCPenney. Phase Two opened in 1966, adding Dayton's as the third anchor. Donaldson's became the fourth anchor in September 1967. Brookdale Center was part of "The Dales", what was referred to as the four "Dale" centers circling the Twin Cities, originally developed by Dayton-Hudson Corporation. The others are Southdale Center in Edina, Rosedale Center in Roseville and Ridgedale Center in Minnetonka. After a long decline, the mall closed in 2010. Except for the Sears store, the mall was demolished in 2011 before being redeveloped into the Shingle Creek Crossing development.

== History ==
=== Brookdale Center 1962 - 2011 ===
In 1955, prior to the opening and success of Southdale Center in nearby Edina, Dayton-Hudson chose to also develop a mall in the Minneapolis suburb of Brooklyn Center, to be called "Northdale. " A 90-acre site in Brooklyn Center (at the crossroads of Osseo Rd, N. 57th Ave., Minnesota State Highway 100, and Shingle Creek) was chosen as the location because Dayton's believed that the area would experience the most growth in suburban Minneapolis within the next ten years. Previously, another developer was interested in the same site for a shopping center, but was rejected because of opposition from nearby land owners. Dayton's also believed that being five miles away from Apache Plaza would not make them competitors (the Mississippi River was between the two malls). By 1957 the development had been renamed Brookdale instead of Northdale, and Dayton's requests to rezone areas around the development were approved.

The construction of the mall was announced in September 1960, and was to be built in two phases. The first phase would be approximately 400,000 square feet (37,000 m^{2}) and include Sears, JCPenney, and an additional 30 stores. The second phase would include Dayton's and 25 more stores. Like Southdale, Brookdale was to be fully enclosed and air conditioned. Groundbreaking was October 12, 1960.

Minnesota based grocer SuperValu announced in October 1960 they would build a 25,000 square feet (2,300 m^{2}) grocery store in phase one of the Brookdale development. JCPenney announced their anchor store details in March 1961, stating they would build a two-story 53,000 sq. ft. store.

Construction of the mall was temporarily halted in June 1961 because of a sheet metal workers strike.

==== Grand opening and expansion ====
On March 4, 1962 Brookdale opened to the public. The stores open at the grand opening, or soon thereafter, in Phase One were Baker Shoes (Edison Brothers Stores), Berkley's, Brookdale Barber Shop, Brookdale Pet Center, Brookdale Municipal Liquor, Brown Photo, Buttrey's, Fanny Farmer Candy Shop, Fashion Beauty Salon, G & K Cleaners, Gager's Handicraft, Grayson's, Hallmark Cards, Jack and Jill, Kinney Shoes, Lancer, Mangel and Hill Meats, Michal's Shoe Repair, Minneapolis Gas Company, Northwestern Federal Savings and Loan, JCPenney, The Record Shop, Sears, Snyder Drug, SuperValu, Walbom's, Williams Cafeteria, F. W. Woolworth Company, Snack Bar, Sears Automotive. The mall had more than 3,000 parking spaces, a fish pool, fountains, and a bird cage.

Three years after the Grand Opening of Phase One, Phase Two construction commenced in April 1965. A new Dayton's store, an expansion of the existing JCPenney store, and an additional twenty stores were to be added in phase two.

In February 1966, work was halted for a week on the construction when 1000 area tradesmen refused to work on several construction projects, including Brookdale, in support of a passenger elevator and escalator workmen strike.

In April 1966, it was reported that Donaldson's was considering adding a store at Brookdale in a potential phase three. The Donaldson's store was confirmed in June 1966, which would ultimately give Brookdale four anchor stores upon completion of the additions in 1967. As they had done at Southdale Center, Donaldson's, Dayton's chief downtown competitor, bought land conjoined to the mall complex so they would own the land underneath their store while still being part of the mall.

Dayton's and the new East Mall section with 20 shops opened July 1966, and added 421,000 square feet (39,100 m^{2}) of retail space to the shopping center. Penney's had been enlarged from 53,000 square feet (4,900 m^{2}) to 140,320 square feet (13,036 m^{2}), more than doubling in size, and also added a 10,000 sq. ft. automotive facility.

Donaldson's opened in September 1967, thus making Brookdale the first Twin Cities area shopping mall with four anchor stores.

The mall was quite successful after its opening in 1962. Although its customers were not quite as affluent as Southdale Center's trade area, Brookdale Center drew from a large area of the north metro (including from the North Side of Minneapolis). As Interstate 94 and Interstate 694 were constructed nearby, the flow of traffic increased. This brought with it homes, people, and shopping. Several nearby major construction projects of the 1960s and 1970s were the addition of businesses featuring Brookdale Ford, a strip mall, and movie theater; as well as many other commercial and residential properties.

In 1973, Brookdale was reporting a 13% increase in sales in April 1973 compared to April 1972, and an overall 5.5% increase year to date from the same period the previous year. They were seeing increases in many categories, including stores specializing in jewelry, gifts, shoes, and clothing.

By the mid 1970s, Brookdale began to change, as newer shopping malls were constructed within the mall's original turf. Northtown Mall, opened in 1972 in Blaine, was one of the first. The Baby Boomer population of Brooklyn Center also had grown up and moved away from home, leaving their middle aged parents behind. Thus, Brooklyn Center had an increasing population of aging and economically disadvantaged residents, and population numbers peaked in the mid 1970s.

Dayton Hudson, the developer and original owner of Brookdale, sold 9 shopping centers in 1978, including Brookdale, to Equitable Life Assurance Company. Dayton Hudson continued as Brookdale's mall management company as a term of the sale.

Nine years after purchasing Brookdale, Equitable Life Assurance Company sold it to Midwest Realty, a limited partnership division of Shearson Lehman. Midwest Realty was inattentive to Brookdale, and disbursed the mall's cash flow to other partners, and did not reinvest into the mall. Equitable Life Assurance Company ultimately foreclosed on the loan when Midwest Realty filed Chapter 11, and the mall was placed in receivership and tied up in the courts for several years. Equitable regained ownership at a cost of $500,000.

In 1987, Donaldson's was purchased by Carson Pirie & Scott Co. and rebranded to Carson's.

By 1992, shoplifting was an issue for most of the malls in the Twin Cities. While Brooklyn Center saw an overall decrease in crime, shoplifting was on the rise in the area, where juvenile theft and larceny had jumped 100 percent during the previous five years. Brookdale participated in a joint program with Brooklyn Center whereas first time juvenile offenders could apologize to the store, possibly make restitution, and thus avoid a criminal record. It was noted that many of the offenders weren't Brooklyn Center residents, and were actually coming from Minneapolis.

The 1990s saw the only renovation to Brookdale, until the major renovation in 2001, when Mervyn's took over the former Carson's location (originally Donaldson's) in 1995.

In 1997, Talisman Company purchased Brookdale for $25 million from ERE Yarmouth (formerly known as Equitable Life Assurance). Talisman specialized in turning around the fortunes of ailing malls and shopping centers. Talisman said Brookdale was located in a middle class, not economically depressed area, and mall sales were averaging $270 per square foot, which was higher than the national average. When purchased by Talisman, Brookdale's vacancy rate was about 30%, which was much higher than the other regional malls in the area.

==== Major renovation and transition ====
Brookdale was 39 years old in 2001, and until that time, had never undergone a renovation. The mall was described as dingy and tired, and continually lost business to other suburban malls. 2001 finally saw a $50 million renovation; commencing with the demolition of the west end of the mall. Improvements included adding two junior anchors, Old Navy and Barnes & Noble, along with youth oriented tenants, a food court, sit down restaurants, cosmetic changes, and better lighting. JCPenney and Sears had previously upgraded their anchor stores; however, Dayton's was slow to update their store, as they were in the process of purchasing Marshall Field's, rebranding, and also perceived to have second thoughts about staying at Brookdale.

Brookdale also applied for, and won, $2.9 million in tax increment financing from the city of Brooklyn Center for the renovation.

In 2003, mall owner Jim Schlesinger, CEO of Talisman Company, ousted Metro Transit from using Brookdale as a bus center hub. At the time, Metro Transit was running 4,000 passengers per day through Brookdale, and Schlesinger said that he would allow the mall to be a destination, but not a hub for ride transfers. He said he was not running a charity, and that bus riders hanging out at the mall waiting on ride transfers did not make good customers. His stance was that it was up to Metro to build their own Brooklyn Center transit hub and not use Brookdale. Metro Transit subsequently opened the Brooklyn Center Transit Center in December 2004.

In 2007, Walmart expressed interest in the Mervyn's site; however, that plan was stalled after Sears filed suit. Sears wanted approval of any other anchors which they felt would affect mall parking or access roads.

==== Store closures and changing reputation ====
The mall maintained all of its anchors until 2004 with the closing of JCPenney. The mall owner, Talisman, said that it was a mutual decision and would free up space for the mall to lease, as they were coming to the end of their $60 million renovation. That same year, the closing of Mervyn's came when Target Corporation sold off its department store branch to May Companies, and they promptly shuttered all Twin Cities area Mervyn's. The first floor of the former JCPenney was replaced with Steve & Barry's, although Mervyn's remained vacant. Steve & Barry's closed its Brookdale store in the fall of 2008 shortly before announcing intentions to close all stores by early 2009 due to bankruptcy liquidation.

Adding to Brookdale's problems, Macy's announced on January 8, 2009 that it was closing its Brookdale location. In April, Barnes & Noble announced it would close its Brookdale store effective June 13, 2009, citing the recent closures of the other anchors as the primary reason for the store's poor sales performance. Sears became Brookdale Center's only remaining anchor store, and the mall's vacancy rate reached over 50 percent, the highest of any Twin Cities-area shopping center.

Even in the early years, Brooklyn Center had a trade area consisting of lower median home values than the trade area of Southdale Center. Due to these patterns dating back when the mall was developed, Brooklyn Center had a blue collar reputation from the beginning through the 1990s. The stores were merchandised to reflect this reputation.

2008 saw nine violent crimes at the mall (one aggravated assault and eight robberies), down from twelve violent crimes in 2007. Serious crimes (theft, auto theft, arson and burglary) dropped from 581 crimes in 2007 to 544 in 2008, a drop of 6.4%. Theft (shoplifting) dropped from 556 in 2007 to 523 in 2008.

When the mall went to auction in 2010, many industry skeptics had doubts as to how successful any redevelopment to the property could be based on trade area shrinkage and area demographics. Stronger retail nodes such as Arbor Lakes in nearby Maple Grove, Minnesota, The Shops at West End in St. Louis Park, Minnesota, and Ridgedale Center began to steer customers away from the once thriving node. Continued disinvestment around Brookdale Center also contributed to its decline. However, Brooklyn Center stated at the time that crime was on the decrease in the area, and had dropped more than 22% from 1999 to 2009.

==== Closing and purchase of Brookdale ====
In December 2009, Brookdale was scheduled to go on the auction block as a foreclosure. Sears, which owned their own store, was the sole remaining anchor at the time.

On April 27, 2010, local newspaper Star Tribune reported that Brookdale had closed on the previous day. Owner Jim Schlesinger still owed $52 million on a $54 million loan, and the center was sold in a sheriff's foreclosure auction. The three lenders still owed were Capmark Finance, Urban Development Fund, and Paramount Community Development Fund, which all assigned their interests to Brookdale Mall HH, who paid $12.5 million for the mall in February 2010.

In October 2010, Gatlin Development Company, a frequent Walmart developer, won the bidding for the defunct mall. Gatlin beat out other bidders including a Minneapolis-based developer who wanted to construct an industrial park on the mall site, and a media producer who wanted to open a TV and media production facility. Gatlin later disclosed they had paid $7.5 million for the site, Walmart paid $6.9 million, and the transaction had to be on a cash basis and not financed conventionally. Sears objected to the plans, as Walmart was a competitor Sears didn't welcome to the development, and had already filed suit in 2007 to keep Walmart out of Brookdale. Gatlin paid $1.75 million for the shuttered Macy's anchor, of which Macy's still owned.

The Sears store remained open as the company owned the land upon which the store was built.

==== Demolition ====
Plans for the demolition of Brookdale Center by Gatlin Development Co. were delayed multiple times due to disputes between Gatlin and Sears, which maintained an open store and expressed concerns about access to their store during the demolition process.

Demolition plans were also delayed as plans for the construction of the new Shingle Creek Crossing were adjusted and finalized. The revised plans added approximately 30,000 square feet (2,800 m^{2}) to the Walmart store, bringing the total to 182,000 square feet (16,900 m^{2}). The revised plan also included two more restaurant pads than the original plan, and eliminated two multiple-tenant buildings.

In August 2011, demolition of the mall began. By September 2011, JCPenney and Macy's former anchor buildings had been razed as well.

=== Shingle Creek Crossing (2012 - present) ===
Shingle Creek Crossing
- Location: Brooklyn Center, Minnesota, United States
- Address: 1341 Brookdale Center, Brooklyn Center, MN 55430
- Opened: 2012
- Developer: Gatlin Development
- Owner: Gatlin Development
- Num. of anchor tenants: 6 (2 vacant; 3 after 04/21/23)
- Floor area: 804,000
- Public transit: Metro Transit

==== Redevelopment of Brookdale Center ====
Plans were announced by Gatlin Development Co. Inc., a Tennessee-based firm, to acquire the Brookdale Shopping Center and in conjunction with the city of Brooklyn Center to transform the mostly-vacant mall into a new shopping center anchored by a Walmart Supercenter and Kohl's. The announcement included the following plans:

- Rename the center "Shingle Creek Crossing"
- Tear down most of the existing structure, but leave the recently constructed food court in place
- Build a 150,000-square-foot (14,000 m^{2}) Wal-Mart Supercenter which would include a grocery store
- Build or redevelop an additional 435,000 square feet (40,400 m^{2}) of leasable retail space
- Add eight restaurant pad sites and two multiple-tenant retail or service buildings.
- Create a green creekscape by resurrecting and excavation Shingle Creek, a stream that was buried in a subterranean culvert under the parking lot when the center was first constructed in the 1960s.

The redevelopment included financial incentives from the City of Brooklyn Center of $4.7 million.

==== Anchoring with Walmart ====
Walmart, which was the first phase of the $100 million redevelopment, opened September 2012. The food court (which was constructed during the 2000s remodel), Sears, and the corridor connecting the food court to Sears were the only remaining structures from Brookdale. However, in early 2014 the food court was demolished, instead of being enveloped in to the new redevelopment as originally planned.

In 2014, LA Fitness opened as a tenant, and construction of a new 110,000 square feet (10,000 m^{2}) building to house additional merchants. Completion of the new construction was slower than anticipated because of the long winter, and the developer's financing complications. Kohl's closing its store at the development was also unexpected and caused a setback.

TJ Maxx and Michaels both joined the development in 2015 by locating to the newly constructed 110,000 sq. ft. building. This activity also spurred further interest in development in the community, including plans for the first new apartments to be built since the 1970s.

Walmart's interest in challenging home town Target, and their market dominance, by constructing on the Brookdale site was credited in 2016 as a defining moment for Twin Cities real estate post-recession turnaround in the area. The nearby Brooklyn Center Target Store was announced in October 2018 as one of six locations to be closed nationwide in February 2019.

In June 2018, The Sears store was on a list of 63 locations slated to be shuttered and closed several months later. Sears closed September 2018, 56 years after opening.

The Kohl's store, built in 1987 and detached from the main mall building, was initially part of Gatlin's redevelopment plan, but closed in 2014. HOM Furniture renovated and expanded the Kohl's building, and took occupancy in 2018.

==== Civil unrest 2020 ====
The Single Creek Crossing shopping center was affected by civil unrest in the aftermath following several police killings of African Americans in the early 2020s. On May 28, 2020, several stores were broken into and vandalized during the George Floyd protests in Minneapolis–Saint Paul. On April 11 and 12, 2021, several stores were looted during the Daunte Wright protests; it was reported that a majority of the businesses at the shopping center were damaged. On February 18, 2022, the Icon Beauty store was looted following a sentencing announcement for Kimberly Potter, the Brooklyn Center police officer who was convicted of manslaughter in the killing of Daunte Wright.

==== Post - COVID-19 era ====
On March 21, 2023, Walmart announced it would close its Brooklyn Center store on April 21, 2023, after 10 years in business. An Asian retail superstore, Empire Foods, opened in the Walmart location in April 2024. At that time Shingle Creek Crossing was reported to include 10 buildings with a total of 200,000 square feet (19,000 m^{2}) at about an 85% occupancy rate.
