= Rosedale Center =

Shopping mall in Ramsey County, Minnesota, U.S.

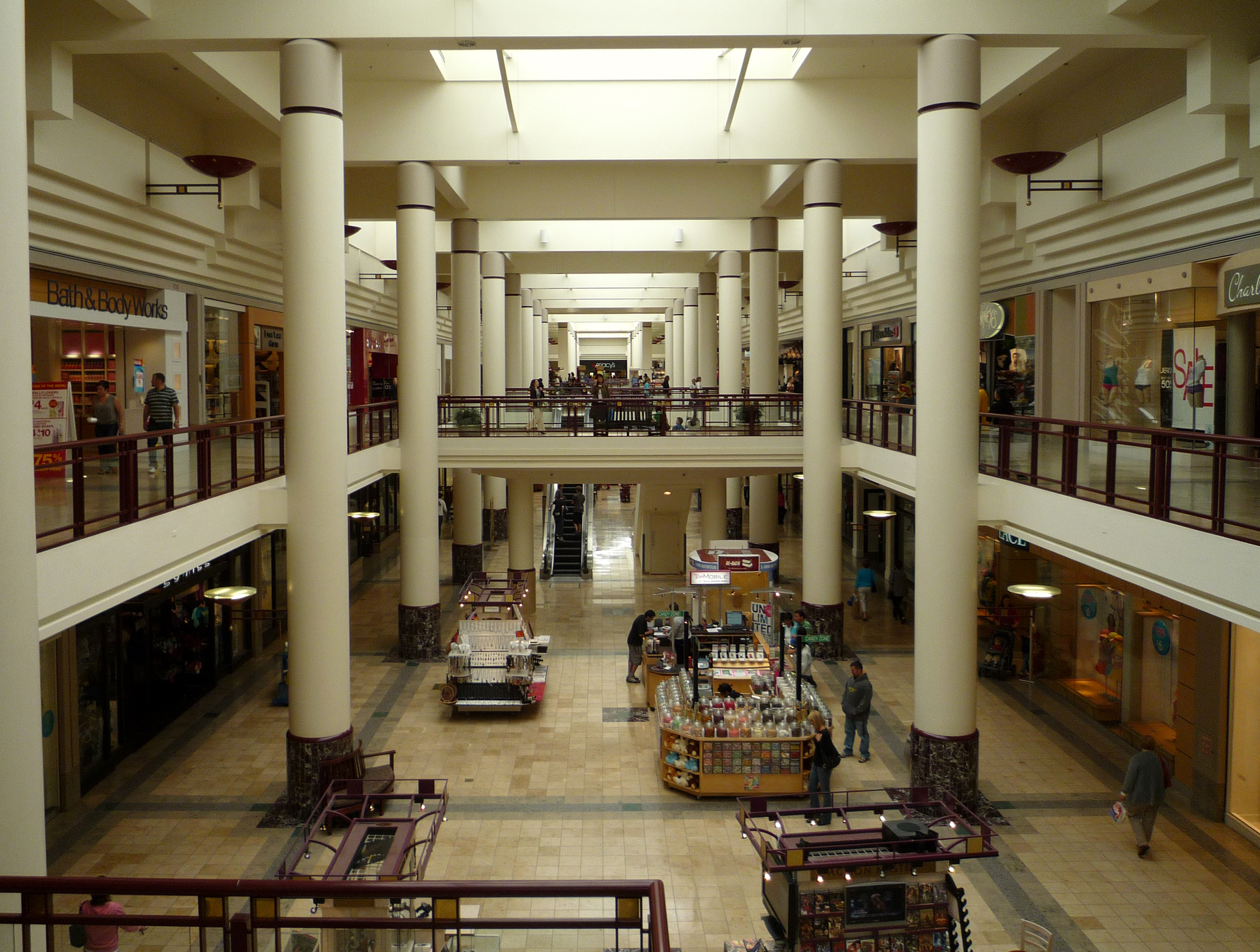
- Main passage, 2009
- Location: Roseville, Minnesota, United States
- Coordinates: 45°0′45″N 93°10′20″W
- Address: 10 Rosedale Center
- Opened: 1969
- Developer: Dayton–Hudson Corporation
- Manager: JLL Properties
- Architect: Victor Gruen
- Num. of stores: 164
- Num. of anchor tenants: 4 (3 open, 1 demolished)
- Floor area: 1,149,487 square feet (106,790.8 m^{2})
- Floors: 2 (3 in Macy's)
- Parking: 5,759
- Public transit: Metro Transit
- Website: rosedalecenter.com

Rosedale Center, known as Rosedale, is a shopping center in Roseville, Minnesota. The mall is centrally located between the Twin Cities of Minneapolis and St. Paul, surrounded by suburbs and close to major highways, and serves a trade area population almost 2 million people. It is #2 in mall foot traffic behind the Mall of America.

The mall's anchor stores are Macy's, Von Maur, JCPenney, AMC Theatre, and Dick's Sporting Goods.

== History ==
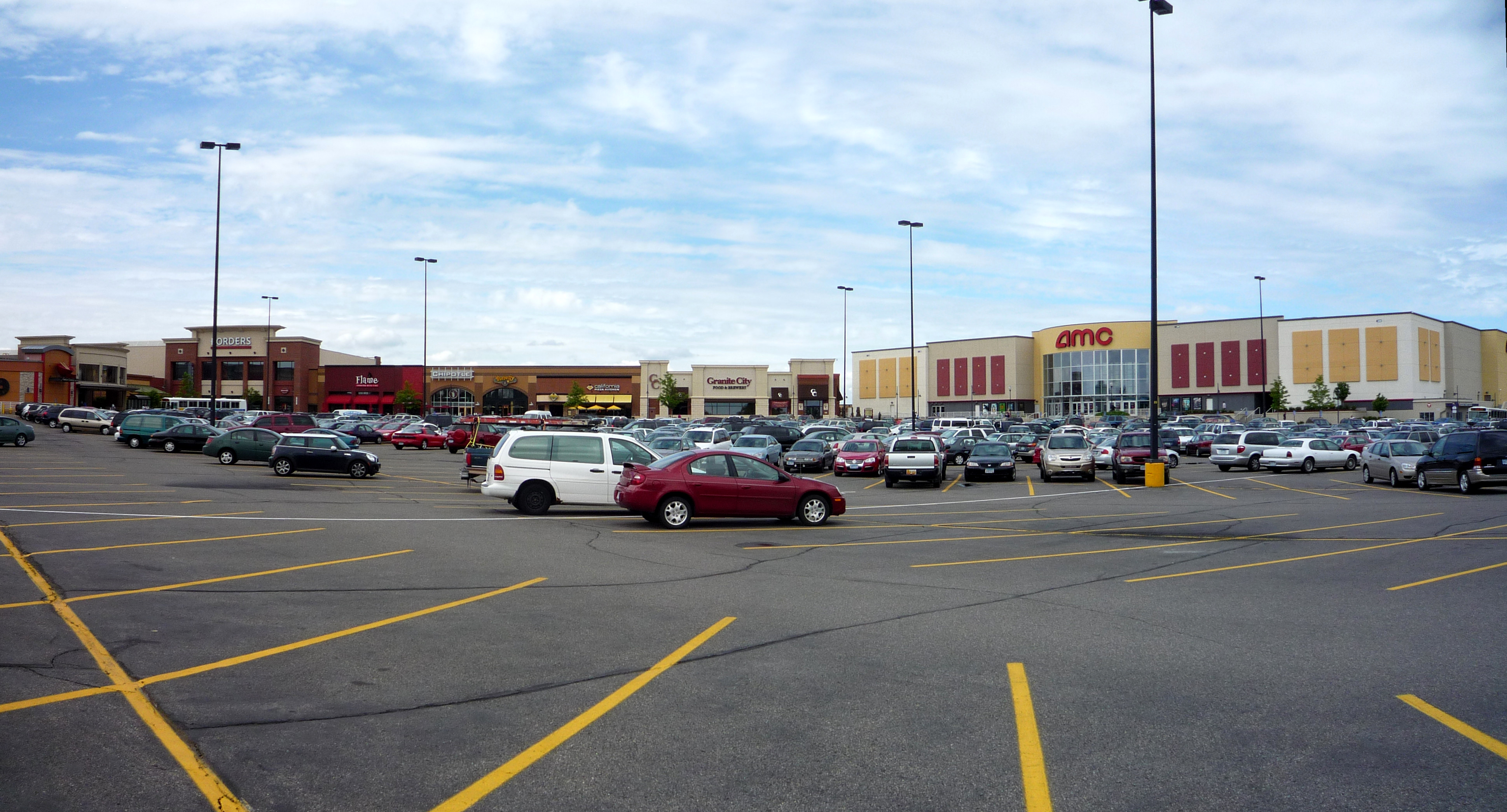
The 2005 expansion added several restaurants and a large movie theater.

First announced in 1966 as a third enclosed mall development to be anchored by both Dayton's and Donaldson's, the Roseville, Minnesota site was chosen because of the population grown in northern Ramsey County. The 150-acre tract of land had previously been purchased by Donaldson's in 1952 for a shopping center that was not built. Opened in 1969, it is the third of the "dale" shopping centers built by the Dayton Hudson Corporation. Southdale Center (1956), in Edina, Minnesota was the first. This was followed by Brookdale Center (1962) in Brooklyn Center, and later by Ridgedale Center (1974) in Minnetonka.

Originally, Rosedale was anchored by Dayton's and Donaldson's department stores. In August of 1976, a major expansion added a JCPenney in a new Northwest Wing, while a Montgomery Ward was added in a new Southeast Wing. In 1992, the mall underwent a major renovation which added a new 4-level (259,400 square foot) Dayton's (which later became Marshall Field's in 2001, now Macy's), new retail spaces in the former Dayton's space, and two parking structures. In August of 1998, Montgomery Ward closed, to be replaced by Herberger's in October of 1999.

The east anchor - originally a Donaldson's, later becoming a Carson Pirie Scott in 1988 and Mervyn's in 1995 before closing in 2004 - was demolished in 2005. Developers built a new, open-air, lifestyle wing, anchored by an AMC theater. This expansion, officially known as the Plaza at Rosedale Center, was dedicated in November 2006. The 14-screen AMC was completed the next month.

In 2015, the Rosedale Center announced a 140,000-square-foot expansion project that opened on October 10, 2018. It includes a Von Maur department store. The project removed 369 current parking spaces, but also built a parking deck to add 450 spaces, a net gain of 81 parking spaces.

Despite a 2016 remodel, Bon-Ton announced on April 17, 2018, the liquidation of all 200+ Herberger's stores after two liquidators, Great American Group and Tiger Capital Group, won an auction for the company. Herberger's closed for the final time on August 30, 2018.

A Portillo's opened outside the mall on January 28, 2019.

In May 2020, the mall and several surrounding stores were looted during the George Floyd protests.

The vacant Herberger's anchor store was demolished in 2021 and in 2024 construction was completed on the new flagship Dick's Sporting Goods.

== Shopping ==
Following the success of their stores in New York, the Macy's at Rosedale Center became their first store in Minnesota to have 24-hour shopping during the 2009 Christmas season.
