= The Empire Mall =

- Location: Sioux Falls, South Dakota, United States
- Coordinates: 43.51058°N 96.77575°W
- Opened: 1975
- Previous names: Sioux Empire Plaza
- Developer: General Growth Development Corp.
- Manager: Dan Gies
- Owner: Simon Property Group
- Architect: Derwood Quade
- Num. of stores: 140 (in 2017)
- Num. of anchor tenants: 5 (4 open, 1 vacant)
- Floor area: 1,027,280 square feet (95,437 m^{2})
- Floors: 1
- Public transit: Sioux Area Metro
- Website: simon.com/mall/the-empire-mall

The Empire Mall is a shopping mall in Sioux Falls, South Dakota, United States. The anchor stores are Dillard's, Macy's, Dick's House of Sport, and JCPenney. The mall is owned by Simon Property Group.

== History ==
Originally developed in 1974-75 by Des Moines-based General Growth Development Corp., it opened as the Sioux Empire Plaza. It was originally opened with the anchors being JCPenney, Herberger’s, & Younkers. It was sold to the IBM Pension Fund in 1985 while General Growth continued to manage the property. In 1998, it was acquired by a joint venture of The Macerich Company and Simon Property Group, with Macerich assuming the role of managing partner. In 2012, Simon Property Group became the sole owner of the mall. In 2018, Simon Property Group, owner of the mall, posted a document about plans for the mall after losing two tenants.

In 1978 the mall underwent its first major expansion, with the addition of Dayton's (later Marshall Field's, now Macy's) and 22 other specialty stores.

In 2016, Ron Soucie replaced Dennis Gilliam as manager. In 2017, Dan Gies replaced Ron Soucie.

Younkers closed on August 29, 2018, after its parent company, The Bon-Ton Stores, went out of business.

Sears closed in September 2018. The vacant Sears store was occupied by a temporary Camping World store from November 2018 to April 2019.

On December 3, 2018, Dillard's announced it would open in the vacant Younkers anchor store, adding 40,000 square feet (3,700 square meters) of space to the existing 100,000 square feet (9,300 square meters) structure. Dillard’s opened in March 2024.
