= Galleria Edina =

Galleria
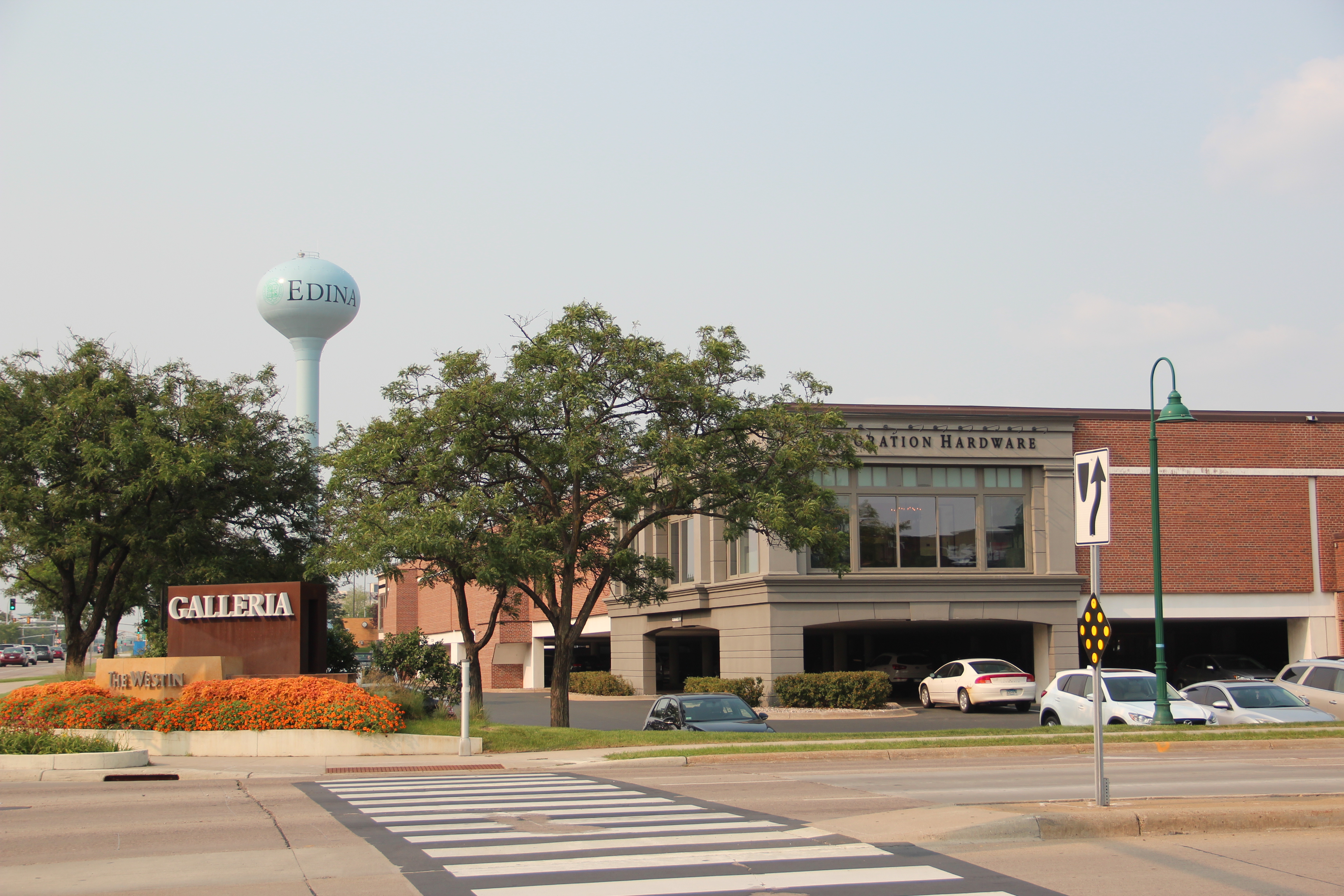
- Location: Edina, Minnesota, United States
- Coordinates: 44°52′37″N 93°19′32″W
- Address: 69th Street and France Avenue
- Opened: 1974
- Developer: Don Gabbert
- Owner: Hines Global REIT
- Num. of stores: 76
- Floor area: 420,000 sq ft (39,000 m^{2})
- Floors: 2
- Public transit: Metro Transit
- Website: galleriaedina.com

The Galleria is an upscale shopping mall in Edina, Minnesota, opened in 1974. It is located directly across the street from Southdale Center, America's first enclosed mall with climate control, which opened in 1956.

== History ==
Dayton Hudson Corporation, the owner of Southdale Center in Edina, Minnesota sold a 24-acre tract of land in May 1972 to Gabbert and Gabbert Company. The land was bordered by France Avenue, York Avenue, W. 69th Street and W. 70th Street; and located directly across the street from Southdale. The parcel of land was adjacent to the Gabbert's furniture store, owned by Gabbert and Gabbert Company, which had been located there since 1956. The sale included the land and existing buildings of Southdale Ford, Cinema I & II, Schmitt Music Center, and Southdale Car Wash; as well as the land occupied by Southdale Bowl and Gabbert's. Gabbert & Gabbert Company said the purchase was made for investment purposes, and anticipation of construction in the near future.

The Galleria began with Gabbert's Furniture Store in 1976. That same year, construction began to add shops connected to Gabbert's, and then to add a full enclosure, like the Southdale Center across the street.

In 2004, the Galleria garnered attention in the shopping centre industry by implementing the then-novel idea of an electronic gift registry where registrants may specify items from multiple merchants at the center.

In 2006, the Galleria received city council approval for an expansion project and site development. The Galleria's plan included an $85 million project attaching a Westin hotel. In 2022, a local investment group, 70th Street Properties, purchased the center for an estimated $150 million. In 2025, the owners completed a renovation of one area overseen by Kraus-Anderson Construction. The new area will accommodate home furnishings retailer Arhaus and other tenants.

== Retailers ==
The mall's stores include Pottery Barn, Marmi, Crave, Williams Sonoma, Pumpz, Coach, Eileen Fisher, Lili Salon Spa, Fawbush's, Ampersand Shops, Bluemercury, InVision, Hammer Made, J.Jill, The North Face, Sotheby's, Barnes & Noble, Arhaus, Chico's, Louis Vuitton, Design Within Reach, Allen Edmonds, Big Island, Tumi, Twill, J.McLaughlin, Free People, Sundance, Vineyard Vines, Gabberts, Crate & Barrel, Kate Spade New York, Tory Burch, and David Yurman.

Local merchants in the center include Ampersand, dugo, Melly, Trail Mark, Hammer Made, Fawbush's, H.O.B.O., Twill by Scott Dayton, Scheherazade and more. National and international luxury brands include Coach, Crate & Barrel, David Yurman, Eileen Fisher, kate spade new york, Louis Vuitton, lululemon, and Tumi. The center has seven restaurants, Pittsburgh Blue, CŌV, Good Earth Restaurant, Barnes & Noble kitchen, CRAVE, McCormick and Schmick's, and Big Bowl.
