= Ridgedale Center =

Shopping mall in Hennepin County, Minnesota, U.S.

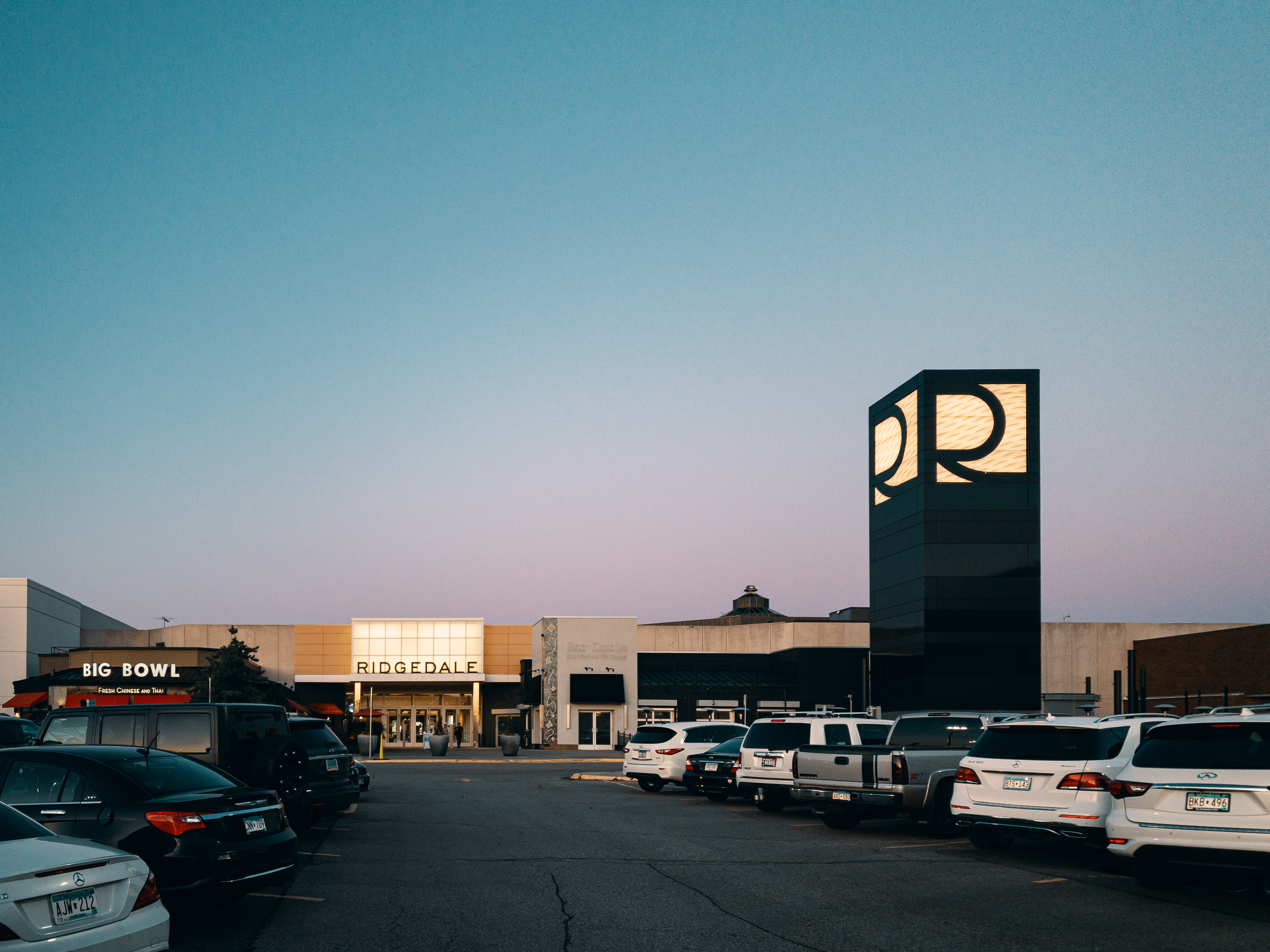
- Ridgedale Center, 2019
- Location: Minnetonka, Minnesota, United States
- Coordinates: 44°58′05″N 93°26′17″W
- Address: 12401 Wayzata Boulevard
- Opened: 1974; 52 years ago
- Developer: Dayton–Hudson Corporation
- Manager: GGP
- Owner: GGP (51%); CBRE Group (49%)
- Architect: Cerny Assoc.
- Num. of stores: 140
- Num. of anchor tenants: 4
- Floor area: 1,105,337 square feet (100,000 m^{2})
- Floors: 2
- Parking: 5,300
- Public transit: Metro Transit
- Website: ridgedalecenter.com

Ridgedale Center, colloquially known as Ridgedale, is an enclosed shopping mall in Minnetonka, Minnesota, a western suburb of the Twin Cities. It is directly located off I-394/US 12 between Ridgedale Drive and Plymouth Road (Hennepin CSAH 61). Ridgedale Center comprises 1,105,337 square feet (100,000 m^{2}) of leaseable retail space, and contains approximately 140 retail tenants. It is jointly owned by and CBRE Group and GGP, a subsidiary of Brookfield Properties, which also manages the mall. The anchor stores are JCPenney, Nordstrom, Macy's, and Dick's House of Sport.

Built in 1974, it was originally anchored by Dayton's, Donaldson's, JCPenney, and Sears, before the first two anchors merged with other companies. The mall has undergone several expansions and renovations throughout the years, including the recent addition of a Nordstrom department store in 2015. Considered an "upscale shopping center", Ridgedale includes various luxury brands such as Coach New York, Swarovski, and TUMI.

== History ==
=== 1974–86: Grand opening ===
Announced in 1972, Ridgedale Center was constructed on 81.3 acres of land owned by the Dayton-Hudson Corporation dating back to 1964. Opening in 1974, after two preliminary name changes from "Oakdale" to "Twelve Oaks" to, finally, Ridgedale, it became the Twin Cities' fourth 'Dale' shopping center, following Southdale, Brookdale, and Rosedale. Construction of the shopping center began in 1972, amidst complaints from environmental groups.

The original center comprised 1,040,000 square feet (97,000 m^{2}) of retail space, and was anchored by Dayton's, Donaldson's, JCPenney, and Sears, the former of which also developed the center.

=== 1987–2006: Dayton's, Marshall Field's, and Macy's ===
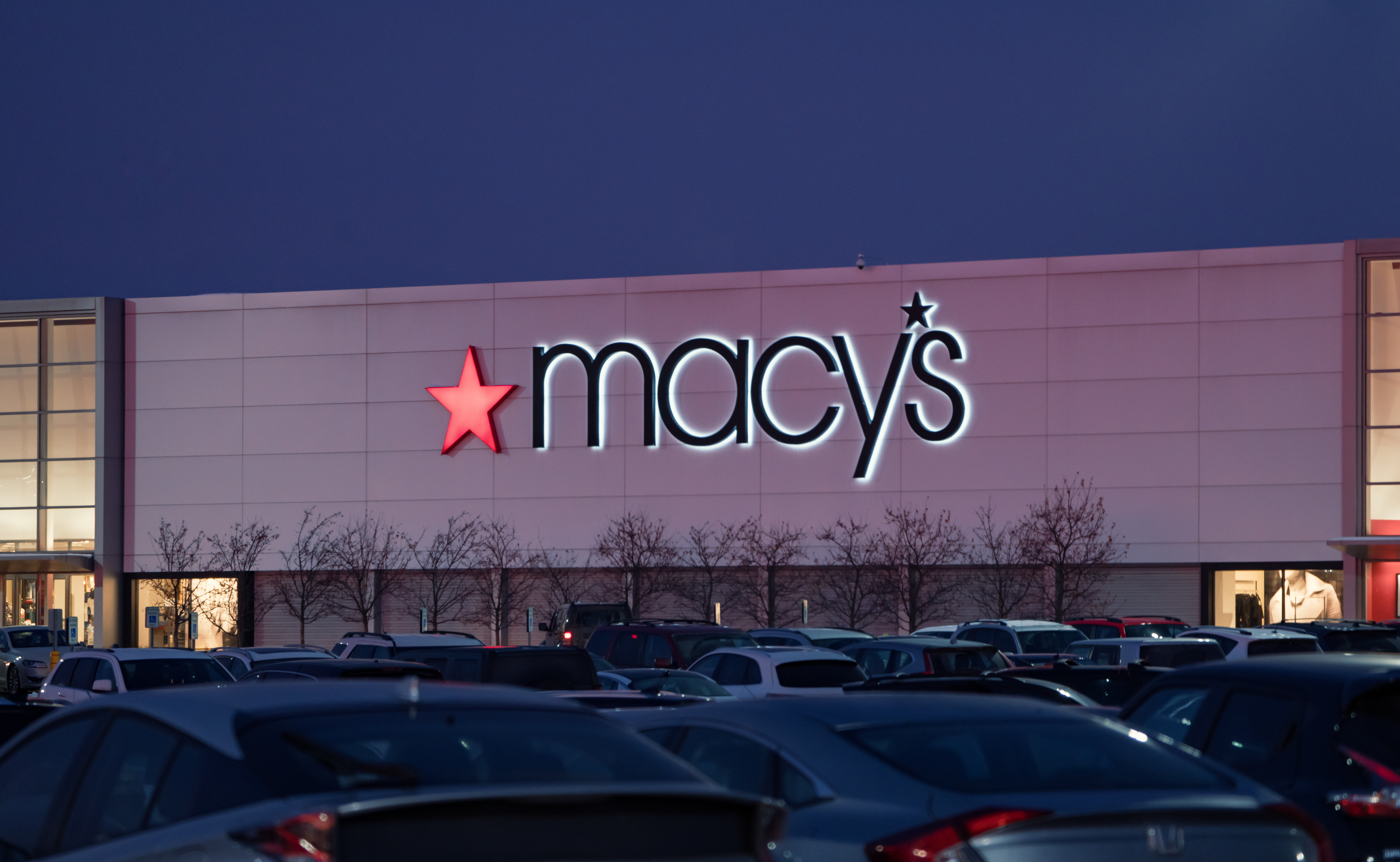
Macy's store

In 1987, Donaldson's announced the merger with Chicago-based department store chain Carson Pirie Scott. The 128,395 square feet (12,000 m^{2}) Donaldson's store was converted to Carson Pirie Scott. Carson Pirie Scott store would also eventually leave Ridgedale Center in 1995.

Dayton's announced plans in the early 1990s to tear down their current location at Ridgedale, and replace it with a much larger location in the same mall; these plans were also made at the other 'dale' centers, like Southdale and Rosedale. However, these plans were eventually scrapped and never occurred. In 1996, Dayton's opened up a second anchor store in the former Carson's location. This second store was seen as a direct move from Dayton's to keep Nordstrom out of Ridgedale. The new store focused on men's clothing and furniture, while the original location changed focus and became centered on women's and children's clothing; the two stores were differentiated by their new titles, "Men's & Home Store" and "Women's and Children's Store".

Mervyn's, a California-based department store, announced interest in the former building, but never opened, despite opening locations at former Carson's locations at Brookdale Center, Eden Prairie Center, and Rosedale Center. In 2001, Dayton's merged with Chicago-based Marshall Field's, which merged with Macy's in 2006.

=== 2007–present: Renovations and Nordstrom opens, Sears closes, Dick's Sporting Goods opens ===
In early 2007, Ridgedale underwent a multimillion-dollar renovation to "freshen and brighten" the mall, with the use of "all-new lighting, flooring, and paint." The renovation also included the addition of new restrooms and seating areas. Completion of the renovation process occurred later that same year. The center was also briefly mentioned in the commercially successful 2007 film Juno.

In 2009, Nordstrom announced plans to open a location at Ridgedale in 2011; however, these plans were later cancelled due to General Growth Properties, the mall's owner, filing for bankruptcy. This announcement came with the closure of the Macy's Men's & Home Store. Later in 2013, Nordstrom confirmed plans to open up a 140,000 square feet (13,000 m^{2}) department store at Ridgedale by 2015; these plans allowed Macy's current anchor of 202,000 square feet (19,000 m^{2}) to grow into a larger, 286,000 square feet (27,000 m^{2}) location. The Macy's Women's & Children's Store was expanded to provide additional space for the combination; during this process, a major fire occurred at the construction site, delaying the construction by several weeks.

On June 4, 2014, deconstruction of the Men's & Home Store occurred, to make way for the new Nordstrom store, plus an additional 85,000 square feet (7,900 m^{2}) of leaseable space, presumably for upscale retail and dining options. This expansion was evaluated at $50 million, according to General Growth Properties. The Nordstrom location officially opened on October 2, 2015, followed by a grand opening ceremony.

On October 15, 2018, it was announced that Sears had filed for bankruptcy and plans on closing 142 stores. These closures include the Sears at Ridgedale, which held a liquidation sale until the end of the year.

In 2022, a Dick's Sporting Goods opened at the mall.
