= Dayton's =

Defunct American department store

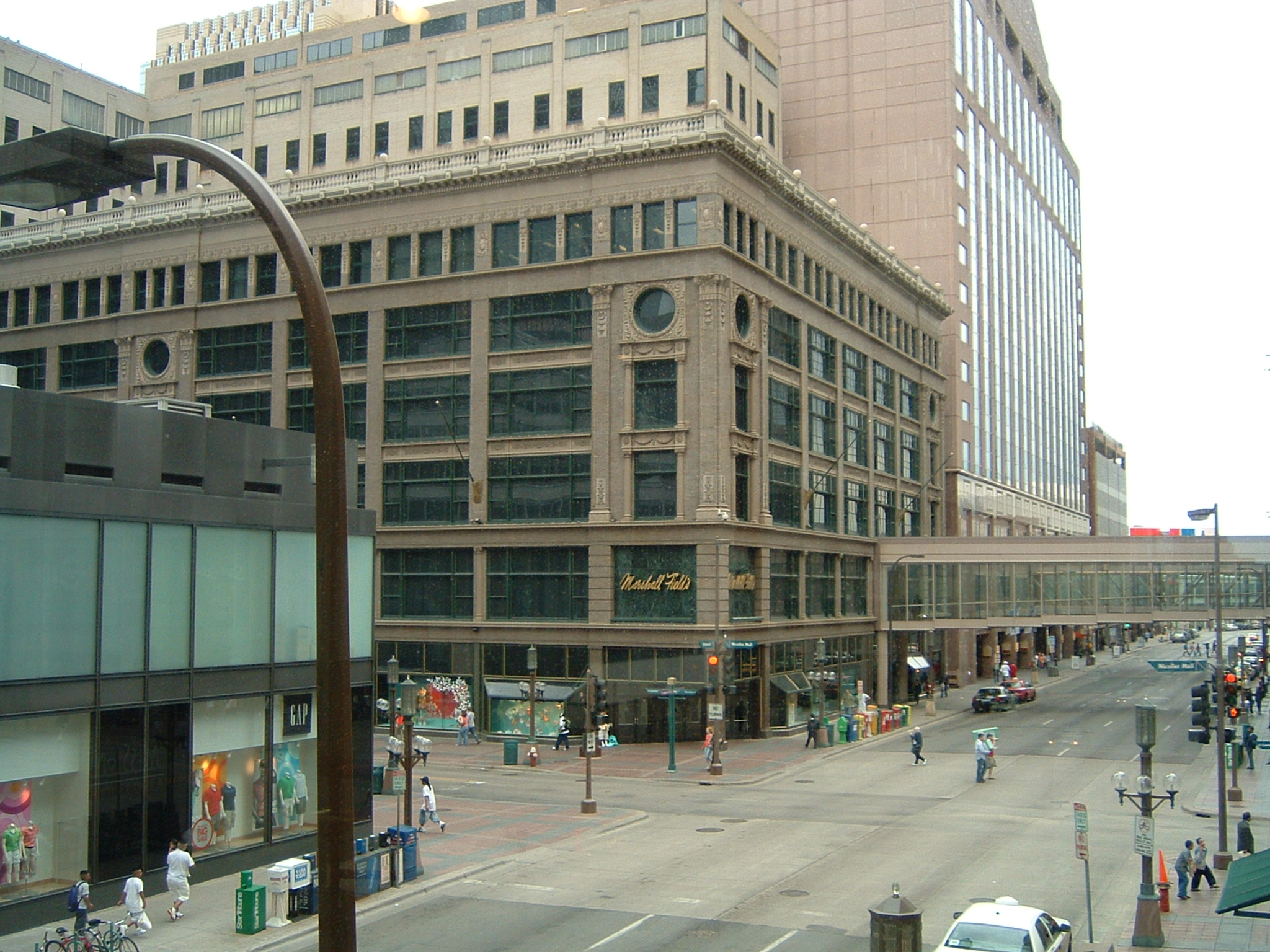
- Exterior of the former flagship store after conversion to Marshall Field's (c. 2001)
- Type: Subsidiary
- Industry: Retail
- Genre: Department stores
- Founded: June 24, 1902; 124 years ago in Minneapolis, Minnesota, United States
- Founder: George Draper Dayton
- Defunct: January 12, 2001; 25 years ago
- Fate: Conversion to Marshall Field's
- Successor: Marshall Field's
- Headquarters: Minneapolis, Minnesota, United States
- Parent: Dayton Hudson Corporation (Note: Dayton Hudson Corporation was renamed Target Corporation in 2000.) (1969–2001)

Dayton's was an American department store chain founded in Minneapolis, Minnesota in 1902 by George Draper Dayton. It operated several local high-end department stores throughout Minnesota and the Upper Midwest for almost 100 years. Although it was regionally known as a high-quality shopping destination, Dayton's is best remembered for starting the discount shopping chain Target. The company was also instrumental in the history of shopping malls, opening the first indoor shopping mall in the United States—Southdale Center in Edina, Minnesota, in 1956.

In 1969, Dayton's merged with Hudson's, a Michigan department store chain to form the Dayton-Hudson Corporation. In 1978, Dayton Hudson merged with Mervyn's Department Stores. The Target division of the company eventually grew so large that in 2000 the corporation was renamed Target Corporation. Dayton-Hudson had acquired Chicago-based Marshall Field's in 1990 and Target rebranded Dayton's stores as Marshall Field's stores in 2001 in an effort to focus more on discount retailing. In 2004, Marshall Field's was purchased by May Department Stores and May subsequently merged in 2005 with Macy's, turning the remaining Marshall Field's stores into Macy's department stores.

For most of its history, Dayton's was owned and operated by the Dayton family. The company's mark on Minnesota remains with three Twin Cities shopping malls created by Dayton's: Southdale, Rosedale, and Ridgedale, all still standing.

== History ==
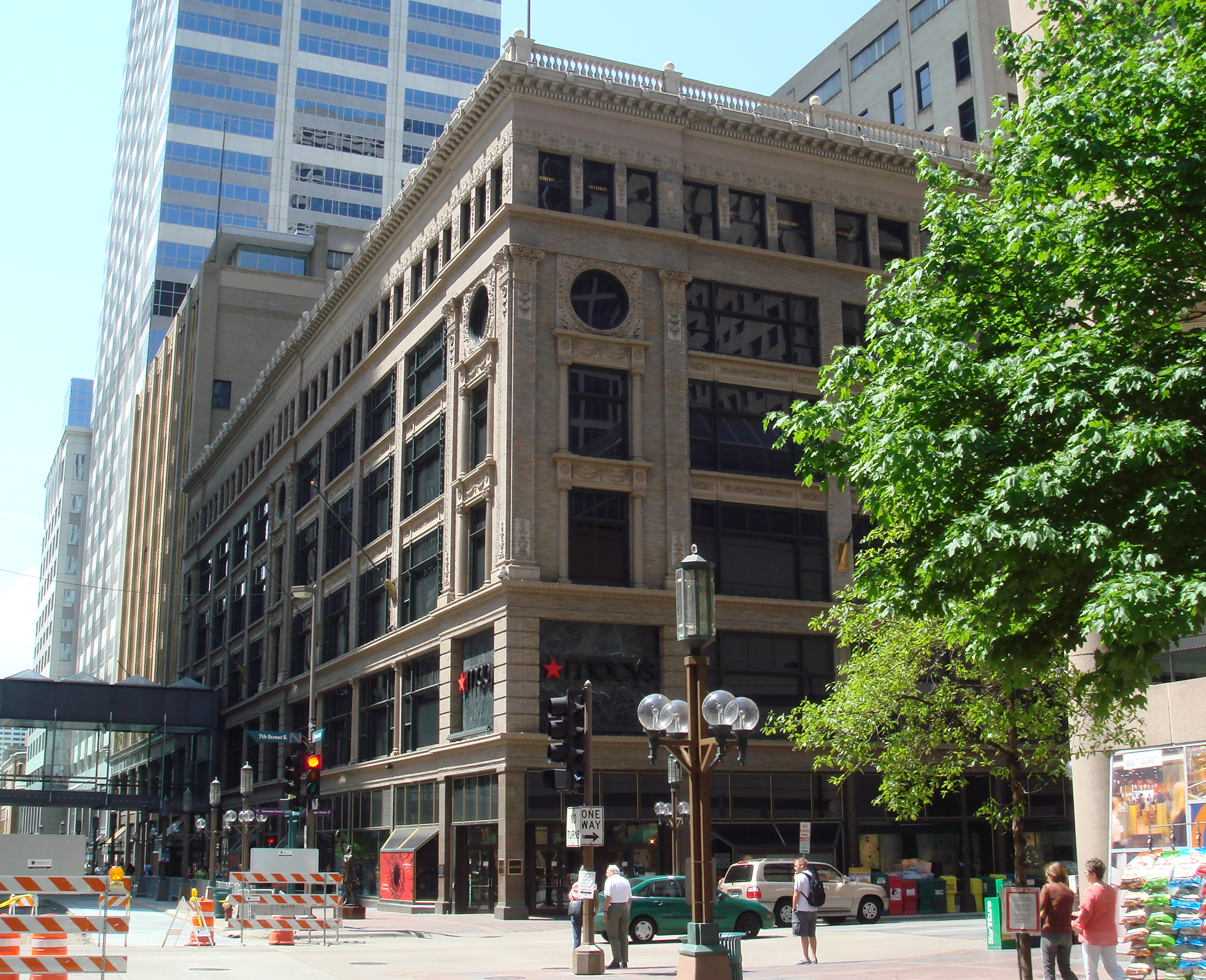
The original, flagship Dayton's store in downtown Minneapolis, followed by Macy's until March 2017

The Dayton Company logo in 1918

=== Goodfellow & Company ===
Dayton's has roots in R.S. Goodfellow & Company, a wet goods business founded as Goodfellow and Eastman in 1878. George Draper Dayton constructed a six-story building at Nicollet Avenue and Seventh Street in 1902 and convinced Goodfellow's, then the fourth-largest department store in Minneapolis, to become the tenant. Designed by Charles Sedgwick, the building made of brick, iron, plate glass, pressed brick and terra cotta, was one of the largest buildings in the city and had all of the latest displays and innovations, including passenger and freight elevators. The Goodfellow's store opened June 24, 1902, and Reuben Simon Goodfellow retired shortly before, selling his interest to Dayton, who financed and partnered with George Loudon, F.H. Carleton, and J.B. Mosher to run the business.

=== Dayton's Wet Goods ===
By 1903, George Dayton had bought out one partner and renamed the store Dayton's Wet Goods Company. At this time, the company stated it would be known as Dayton's. After the name change was completed, Dayton's operations were handled by George Dayton along with his son, Draper Dayton, and J.B. Mosher. Mosher left the company in December 1905. In 1911, the name was changed again to The Dayton Company.

=== Dayton's ===
Dayton's officially became the Dayton Company in 1911, and also purchased the property at Nicollet and Eighth Street in downtown Minneapolis to expand Dayton's retail footprint. By 1929, the downtown location consisted of three buildings: the original building from 1902 and two additions from 1913 and 1929, totaling about a million square feet.

Draper Dayton died unexpectedly at the age of 43 in 1923. Dayton's founder, George Draper Dayton, died in 1938; and his surviving son, George Nelson Dayton, succeeded him as president of the company.

=== 1940s and 1950s ===
Expanding its downtown Minneapolis location in 1947, Dayton's added four floors to the existing eight-story building, bringing the total retail space to 12 floors, at a cost over $2 million (~$22.6 million in 2025). In 1949, on the hunt for new and different items for its clientele, Dayton's accepted several Cootie games on consignment from its inventor, Minnesota resident William "Herb" Schaper. The games sold very well, and reorders were placed. Dayton's sold 5,500 Cootie games between Thanksgiving and Christmas, and the Game of Cootie was on its way to becoming a classic.

Dayton's president George Nelson Dayton died at the age of 63 in 1950, 12 years after becoming president. One of the five sons of George Nelson Dayton, Donald C. Dayton, was named president of Dayton's at that time, thus becoming the third-generation family member with the Dayton surname to helm the department store. George Nelson Dayton's five sons each inherited 20% of the business after the death of their father; all are credited with managing and expanding Dayton's into the modern retail era, along with the creation of Target Corporation, changing the dynamics of retail in not only Minnesota but also nationwide.

In August 1952, Dayton's announced the acquisition of Knowlton Company in downtown Rochester, Minnesota. Knowlton had been in business since 1848, and became Dayton's second store; thus the beginning of Dayton's establishing itself as a department chain store company. After almost two years of expansion and renovations, the Rochester Dayton's opened in March 1954.

Dayton's pending development of its first shopping center, Southdale Center, was announced in June 1952. Southdale was planned, conceived, constructed, and owned by the Dayton Company. Southdale became the first fully enclosed, climate-controlled shopping mall in the United States, changing the retail landscape. Dayton's purchased 500 acres in Edina, Minnesota, to construct the historic $10 million (~$90.6 million in 2025) complex, which opened in 1956 with around 50 shops. 40,000 visitors attended the grand opening of the mall and immediately its success exceeded all expectations. Southdale became Dayton's third store; it was the company's second location and first in a series of shopping centers in the Twin Cities.

In November 1954, Dayton's announced it had acquired Fantle Bros. Department Store in Sioux Falls, South Dakota. This marked the first purchase and location for a Dayton's-owned store outside of Minnesota, but it kept the Fantle name instead of converting to the Dayton's nameplate. In 1955, Dayton's announced the acquisition of land in Brooklyn Center, Minnesota, for a shopping mall. Before the opening of Southdale Center, Dayton's was planning to construct a second shopping center called Northdale, but the name was changed to Brookdale. Brookdale was not scheduled to be constructed immediately. In June 1958, Dayton's announced plans with the Radisson Hotels, adjacent to the downtown store, to construct a joint parking ramp for customers and guests of both companies and downtown visitors in general. The Dayton Radisson Ramp was constructed to accommodate 750 cars, which did not make it the largest in town, but was designed for quick and convenient accessibility for patrons to both properties.

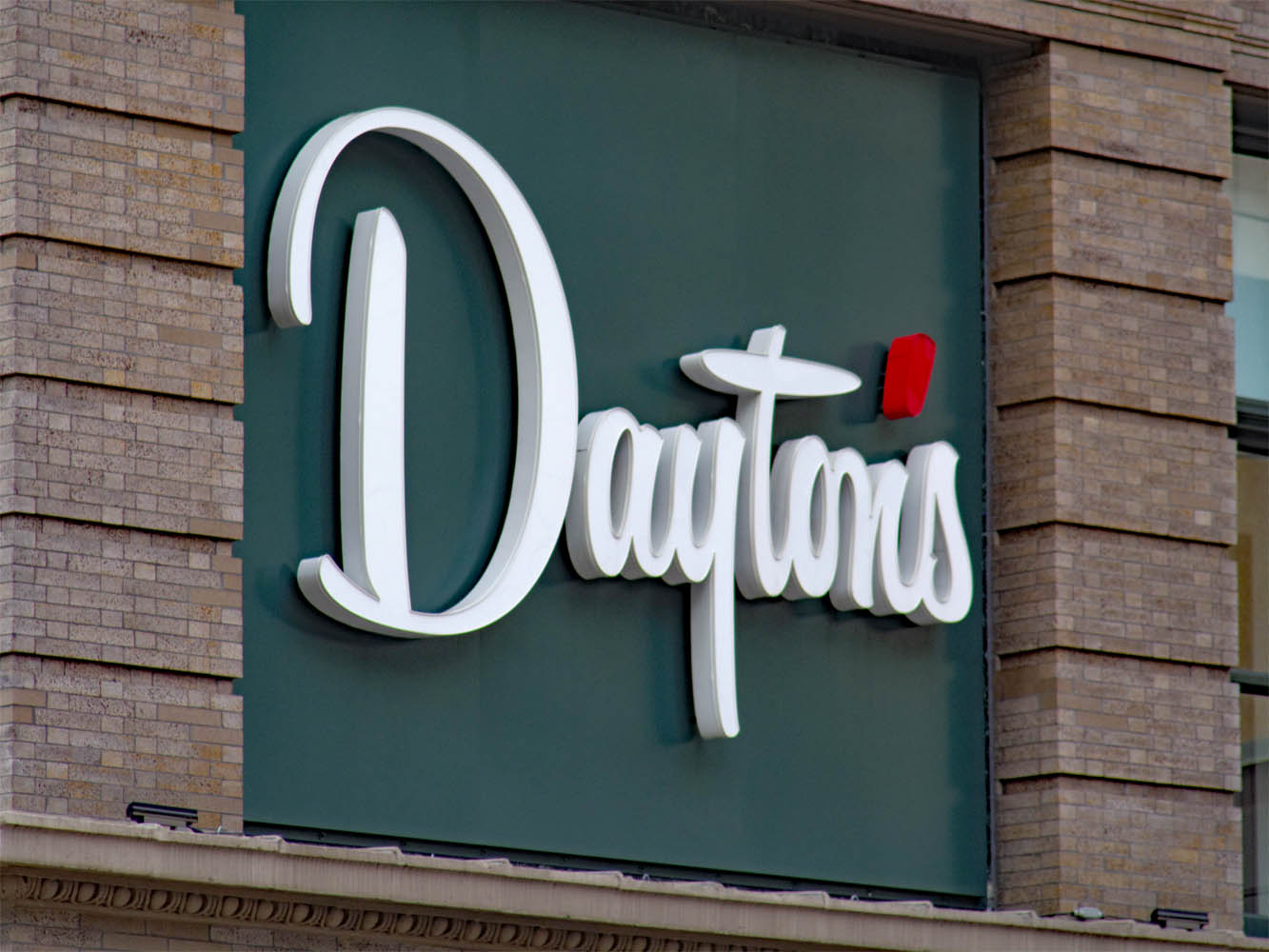
Modern retro signage of 1950s logo

Also in 1958, Dayton's merged with Schuneman's Department Store in Saint Paul, Minnesota. Dayton's also announced it had acquired choice retail property in downtown St. Paul to construct a new store in the future. The Dayton's-Schuneman's store continued operations in the Schuneman's building. Schuneman's was thought to have annual sales of $12-$15 million at the time, while Dayton's was thought to be around $80 million. By early 1960, Dayton's owned all property on the block fronted by Wabasha, Cedar, and 6th and 7th Streets in St. Paul.

=== 1960s ===
In February 1962, after acquiring additional property needed to expand in St. Paul, Dayton's announced plans for a five-story building and parking ramp for 650 cars, located in one structure. Brookdale Center opened in Brooklyn Center in March 1962. Planned before the successful opening of Southdale Center, Brookdale was the second shopping center developed by Dayton's, and further expanded its retail footprint into the growing suburbs. Dayton's was to construct and open a 195,000 sq ft Dayton's store at Brookdale in phase two of construction, opening in July 1966.

The new St. Paul store opened in August 1963 with 380,000 sq ft of retail space in five stories, taking up an entire city block. The estimated cost of the new project was $14 million. The old Dayton's-Schuneman building across the street was razed for new development. By 1964, Dayton's had become the second-largest privately owned department-store chain in the country, with sales estimated to be at least $130 million (~$1.03 billion in 2025) annually.

Dayton's announced its third shopping center development in 1966, Rosedale Center. The name continued the convention of "Dale" with the complex located in Roseville, Minnesota, a suburb of St. Paul. Rosedale Center opened in August 1969 and became the location of the sixth Dayton's store. This large Dayton's location had three stories, employed more than 600 people, and had 190,000 sq ft of retail space. Fantle's Department Store in Sioux Falls, South Dakota, was sold by Dayton's, 13 years after purchasing it in 1967. Fantle's had never converted to the Dayton's name, and Dayton's said the reason for the sale was that the company wanted to concentrate on stores in major metropolitan areas. However, Dayton's returned to Sioux Falls with a store bearing its own nameplate 11 years later.

In the '60s, Dayton's was one of the first retailers to recognize the buying power of the teen market, and it aggressively pursued it with youth-oriented merchandise, concerts, and attractions. From 1962 to 1966, it hosted a weekly teen dance with live music in the 8th-floor auditorium, attracting up to 5,000 teens per week. In 1966, it spearheaded a "Super Youthquake" movement at area Dayton's stores featuring the latest fashions and music, with artists including Simon & Garfunkel and The Yardbirds. The Yardbirds' appearance at Dayton's was the first U.S. tour date played by Jimmy Page. Dayton's efforts paid off, and in 1965, it won Seventeen magazine's award for outstanding youth retail. Dayton's captured and enjoyed a trendsetter reputation, which contributed greatly to its success and standing apart from other area retailers.

In August 1967, Dayton's changed its name to "The Dayton Corporation", added outside members to its board (increasing the board to 12 persons), and prepared for its first public stock offering. The Dayton family still owned an estimated 85% of the corporation's stock after the initial public offering in October of that year, and still owned 43% of the stock by 1977. The Dayton Corporation and J.L. Hudson (Hudson's) of Detroit merged at the close of the 1960s. At the time of acquisition, J.L. Hudson was the nation's largest independently owned department-store company. Upon realization of the merger, Dayton Hudson Corporation became the 14th-largest nonfood retailer in the U.S., with combined sales over $800 million.

==== Target Stores ====
In an announcement made in July 1961, Dayton's entered a new era of shopping with a discount store chain to operate separately from Dayton's department stores. The new chain constructed stores in the Twin Cities area, and each store featured about 125,000 sq ft of retail space. This move was the first by a department store chain in the upper Midwest to enter the discount retailing field. Named Target, the new stores would become the model for continued success by U.S. retailers, in a class by itself, even as it approached its 60th anniversary. Its success was so great that, in time, Target Corporation survived Dayton's, the original parent company.

The first Target store opened in May 1962 in Roseville, Minnesota, a suburb of St. Paul, Minnesota. Rapidly expanding, by the end of the year there were four Target stores, with locations in Roseville, Crystal, Duluth, and St. Louis Park, Minnesota.

==== B. Dalton ====
B. Dalton Booksellers was announced in April 1966 as a new book-store chain to be launched and wholly owned by Dayton's. After research, Dayton's believed book stores would be a successful merchandising field for the company, due in part to the increase in education and disposable income of Americans. Named after Bruce Dayton, the head of Dayton's at the time (and one of George Nelson Dayton's five sons), Dayton's intent from the beginning was for B. Dalton to be a national book-store chain, with locations across the U.S. In 1966, the average book-store chain's retail footprint per store was roughly 2,500–2,900 sq ft; B. Dalton's first store was to be 7,200 sq ft. In August 1966, the first B. Dalton Bookseller, in the Dayton-owned Southdale Center in suburban Edina, opened. Expansion developed quickly, with the next store in the chain opening in February 1967 in St. Louis, Missouri; another six stores were planned at that time.

=== Dayton Hudson Corporation Years ===
Logo in 1974, featuring "amaranth" mark used from 1968 to 1989

==== 1970s ====
The bombing of the women's restroom at the St. Paul store occurred in 1970. Another, larger bomb was found nearby, but failed to detonate. A juvenile, 15 years old at the time of the bombing, was convicted of the crime.

Ridgedale, the fourth of the Dayton's "Dales" shopping centers in the Twin Cities, along with a Ridgedale Dayton's store, were announced in January 1972, amid concern over what was described as "an ecologically destructive project." After pressure by environmental groups, Dayton's moved ahead with construction, but shelved plans to further develop a new road by the property, and agreed to a moratorium on further development in the area until at least 1980. The shopping center, along with the new Dayton's store, opened in July 1974, and became the final "Dale" location.

Dayton's moved its Rochester store from downtown to Rochester's new Apache Mall in 1972. The mall had been open for a short time when Dayton's decided to leave the downtown area and construct a new 150,000 sq. ft. store at the mall. At that time, Apache Mall was the third-largest shopping center in Minnesota and the largest outside of the Twin Cities area. Dayton's move was considered a tipping point in the movement of retail commerce away from downtown Rochester. Previously announced in 1971, the first Dayton's store outside of Minnesota opened in August 1973 in Fargo, North Dakota. The $5 million store was one of the anchors of the newly constructed West Acres Shopping Center, contained about 100,000 sq ft of retail space, and employed close to 200 people.

Crossroads Center in St. Cloud, Minnesota, opened in 1966 with Sears and J.C. Penney as anchors. The shopping center underwent an expansion in 1976, adding an additional 200,000 sq ft of retail space, resulting in the inclusion of a new Dayton's store, marking its entrance in the St. Cloud market. The St. Cloud Dayton's store opened in July 1976. Dayton's agreed in 1973 to join the planned Homart Development Company's Burnsville Center shopping center project to be built in Burnsville, Minnesota. This was an unusual plan of action for Dayton's, as this would be its first location in a Twin Cities area shopping center not developed, owned, or managed by Dayton Hudson Corporation. The 180,000 sq ft Burnsville store became Dayton's 10th location when it opened in July 1977.

In September 1976, Dayton-Hudson Corporation announced a shopping center would be built in addition to a Dayton's store being constructed in Grand Forks, North Dakota. That was the company's first shopping center to be developed and built in North Dakota. The Columbia Mall opened in 1978, and while Dayton-Hudson remained at the mall, the company did not own the shopping center for long, selling it in 1979.

Dayton's had not owned a store in Sioux Falls since selling Fantle's Department Store in 1967. In 1977, Dayton's announced the construction of a new Sioux Falls store, which would become the first with the Dayton's nameplate in South Dakota. The Sioux Falls market was chosen for a Dayton's location based on the familiarity of the Dayton's name with area residents, and because 1,500 Dayton's credit-card account holders resided in the area, though the closest Dayton's was about 250 miles away. The new Dayton's location contained about 100,000 sq ft of retail space and $3 million (~$11.6 million in 2025) in inventory when it opened at the Empire Mall in July 1978. It was also a unique store for Dayton's because it did not have the larger furniture, drapery, and carpet departments like its Minnesota counterparts, and was considered Dayton's most forward store in design and décor at the time of its opening.

In 1978, Bob Dayton, son of former Dayton's president Donald Dayton, walked away from his executive position to purchase a competing retailer, Harold, located just down the street on Nicollet Mall from Dayton's flagship store in Minneapolis. Harold was a high-end women's retailer in Minneapolis, and had been experiencing declining sales in recent years, due in part to previous absentee ownership. Bob Dayton had grown bored at Dayton's and was excited by the opportunity to purchase Harold, and go head-to-head against the business his great grandfather founded. Besides owning Harold, he also developed The Conservatory, a retail shopping center on Nicollet Mall directly across the street from Dayton's, and which was ultimately deemed a failure and demolished. Harold went out of business in 1990.

Dayton's continued to expand and announced its fifth shopping center, and first Wisconsin Dayton's store, in 1978. This would be its first shopping center to be built outside Minnesota, and would be located in La Crosse, Wisconsin. Valley View Mall (La Crosse, Wisconsin) opened in July 1980, with Dayton's as one of the four anchor stores. In March 1978, Dayton's relocated its Home Store from Southdale Center to a newly constructed store nearby, also in Edina. This was unusual in that the Dayton's Home Store was no longer located within the same mall as the Dayton's store.

==== 1980s ====
Kenneth Dayton, the last of the five Dayton brothers still affiliated with Dayton's, responsible for leading and guiding the company through the modern era, announced his retirement in June 1983. His retirement resulted for the first time in the company's history that a Dayton family member would no longer be employed by Dayton's. Dayton's third North Dakota store was announced in November 1984. The store, located in Bismarck, North Dakota, at the Kirkwood Mall, was the site of a former F.W. Woolworth Company, later Woolco. The Bismarck store opened on August 1, 1985.

Dayton's was a trendsetter in the marketing of exclusive plush animals available during the holiday season. In 1985, it introduced Santabear, a toy bear so hugely popular that it generated $300 million (~$761 million in 2025) in sales within nine years. Its success inspired other retailers such as Macy's, Walmart, and Dayton's sibling Target Corporation to introduce their own holiday plush animals to bring customers into their stores during the holidays.

In July 1988, Dayton's announced future expansion by building larger stores for its Southdale and Rosedale locations, the first Dayton's construction since the opening of the Bismarck store in 1985. This expansion was seen as a response to the planned Mall of America to be constructed in nearby Bloomington, Minnesota. The new Dayton's stores were to be constructed next to the existing stores, which would be renovated to accommodate 50 new retailers at Southdale and 30 new retailers at Rosedale.

==== 1990s ====
In April 1990, Marshall Field's was acquired from Batus Inc. by the department-store division of the Dayton–Hudson Corporation in a $1.04 billion (~$2.26 billion in 2025) deal. The new ownership planned to retain the Marshall Field's name, as it was well-known and well-respected. Dayton's again expanded into Wisconsin, and opened a new store in August 1991 in Eau Claire, Wisconsin, at Oakwood Mall. After previously announcing its intentions in 1988, Dayton-Hudson also opened a new Dayton's in the summer of 1991 in Appleton, Wisconsin, at Fox River Mall, after closing a nearby Marshall Field's location.

With the opening of the nearby Mall of America in 1992, Dayton's is thought to have struck a deal with Equitable Real Estate Investment Management Inc, the owners of both Southdale Center and Rosedale Center. In exchange for Dayton's agreement to stay put at both malls and not defect to the Mall of America, Equitable gave Dayton's $40 million to construct two larger stores at both Southdale and Rosedale, and Dayton's gave Equitable its two old stores, which were renovated into mall space. Dayton's new location opened at Southdale Center in August 1990. The new location was 370,000 sq ft, four stories, and featured many modern amenities, replacing the older, smaller original Dayton's location. The new 260,000 sq ft Rosedale counterpart opened in the summer of 1991.

For the first time since 1978, when the Edina Home Store opened, Dayton's opened a new store in the Twin Cities. The new location opened at Maplewood Mall in the St. Paul suburb of Maplewood in October 1996. The store was located in the former Carson's space, one of the eight area Carson's spaces purchased by Dayton's in a $74 million (~$143 million in 2025) cash deal in 1995 following the closure of the Twin Cities Carson's locations.

Another remodeled former Carson's property at Ridgedale Center was opened as a Dayton's location. This property became Dayton's second location at Ridgedale, housing the men's and home stores. Dayton's had been cramped at Ridgedale for years, so it was seen as advantageous to expand into two locations at the same mall; also, it was seen as a strategic move to keep Nordstrom out, as that company appeared to be interested in Ridgedale Center. Nordstrom eventually opened at the mall.

=== Target Corporation ===
Dayton-Hudson Corporation announced in January 2000 a name change to Target Corporation. Acknowledging that Target stores made up 80% of its revenue and that the Target name was better known nationally, Dayton-Hudson believed Target was the name, and direction, of the corporation's future. Taking on the name of one of its brands was considered unusual for a corporation, but Target had been Dayton-Hudson's top revenue producer for 23 years, and the corporate name change was met with enthusiasm by investors.

=== Name change ===
In January 2001, much to the dismay of shoppers in Minneapolis-St. Paul and Detroit, Dayton's and Hudson's were rebranded with the Marshall Field's nameplate, which has a higher national profile. This change was viewed as a strategic move and deemed necessary in the Internet age to create a unified presence. Dayton's popular sales events - Daisy Sale in summer and Jubilee Sale in fall, were renamed "Field Days" after 2001. The first sign of the name change came with the discontinuation of the Dayton's website in favor of the Marshall Field's site in May 2001. The demise of the Dayton's name in favor of the Marshall Field's nameplate occurred later in 2001, and affected the existing Dayton's stores, including eight in the Twin Cities, one in St. Cloud, one in Rochester, three in North Dakota, one in South Dakota, and three in Wisconsin.

=== Sale and final name change ===
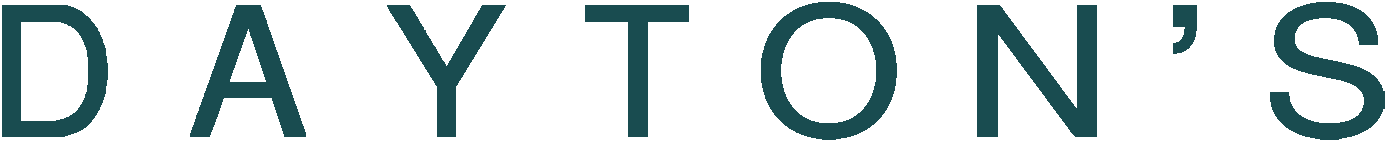
Dayton's Department Store Final Logo

After rumors dating back to 1995 that May Department Stores was interested in Dayton's, in 2004, Target Corporation announced the sale of the Marshall Field's department store group, including the 62 stores serving communities in Illinois, Indiana, Michigan, Minnesota, North Dakota, Ohio, South Dakota and Wisconsin, to May Department Stores. Target sold off its Mervyn's stores in a $1.65 billion (~$2.69 billion in 2025) deal to a private investment fund in 2004. (Mervyn's went bankrupt in 2008).

In February 2005, May Department Stores merged with Federated Department Stores, owner of Macy's, in an $11 billion (~$17.4 billion in 2025) deal. Later that year, in September, Marshall Field's stores were announced to be taking the Macy's name, ending the run of Marshall Field's – and the then-still freshly renamed Dayton's and Hudson's – as unique, upscale Midwestern department-store brands.

In 2017, Macy's announced that the Dayton's downtown Minneapolis flagship store, rebranded as Marshall Field's in 2001, and Macy's in 2006, would close, ending an era. Its final day of business was March 19, 2017, closing the book on more than a century of retail at that location. The building was purchased for $40 million by 601W Cos., an investment firm with a history of remodeling and reselling refurbished skyscrapers. In an innovative redevelopment of the property, with a nod to the past, it has been converted into "The Dayton's Project", a mixed-use retail, office space, and entertainment complex with some of the original Dayton's elements restored, while being redesigned for the 21st century.

== Dayton's locations ==
Dayton’s Store Locations
Location	City	State	Year opened	Year closed
Southdale Center	Edina	Minnesota	1956	Closed in August 1990, moved to new building at Southdale Center
Downtown	Minneapolis	Minnesota	1902	Closed by Macy's 2017; redeveloped
Southdale Home Store	Edina	Minnesota	1978	Operated as Macy's Home Store, Closed 2024 and scheduled for Demolition
Southdale Center	Edina	Minnesota	1990	Operates as Macy's
Rochester	Rochester	Minnesota	1954	Closed in 1972, moved to a new location at Apache Mall
Apache Mall	Rochester	Minnesota	1972	Operates as Macy's
Downtown St Paul Schuneman’s Building	St Paul	Minnesota	1958	Closed 1963, moved to new Wabasha Street location
Downtown St Paul Wabasha Street	St Paul	Minnesota	1963	Closed by Macy's 2013
Brookdale Center	Brooklyn Center	Minnesota	1966	Closed by Macy's 2009, demolished
Rosedale Center	Roseville	Minnesota	1969	Closed summer 1991, moved to new building at Rosedale Center
Rosedale Center	Roseville	Minnesota	1991	Operates as Macy's
Ridgedale Center	Minnetonka	Minnesota	1974	Expanded in 2014, operates as Macy's
Ridgedale Center Men’s and Home Store	Minnetonka	Minnesota	1995	Closed by Macy's 2013, demolished for new Nordstrom location
Crossroads Center	St. Cloud	Minnesota	1976	Operates as Macy's
Burnsville Center	Burnsville	Minnesota	1977	Operated as Macy's until early 2025. Closed.
Empire Mall	Sioux Falls	South Dakota	1978	Operates as Macy's
Valley View Mall	La Crosse	Wisconsin	1980	Closed by Macy's 2017
West Acres Shopping Center	Fargo	North Dakota	1973	Operates as Macy's
Columbia Mall	Grand Forks	North Dakota	1978	Closed by Macy's 2017
Kirkwood Mall	Bismarck	North Dakota	1985	Closed by May Department Stores in 2005, demolished for new Target location
Oakwood Mall	Eau Claire	Wisconsin	1991	Closed by Macy's 2017
Fox River Mall	Appleton	Wisconsin	1991	Operates as Macy's
Maplewood Mall	Maplewood	Minnesota	1996	Operated as Macy's until March 2025. Closed.

== See also ==
- List of department stores converted to Macy's
