= Candyland (disambiguation) =

Candy Land, or Candyland, is a racing board game currently published by Hasbro.

Candy Land or Candyland may also refer to:

- Candyland (Theatres des Vampires album), 2016
- Candyland (James McMurtry album), 1992
- Candyland (Brooke Candy album), 2024
- Candyland (group), an American musical duo
- "Candyland" (song), a song by Gwen Stefani
- Candy Land (film), a 2022 horror film directed by John Swab
- Candy Land: The Great Lollipop Adventure a 2005 animated film
- Candyland, a fictional plantation in the 2012 film Django Unchained
- CandyLand, a confectionery brand owned by Ismail Industries Limited
- Candy Land, a game show on the Food Network
