= The Dayton's Project =

Mixed department store and office in Minneapolis

- Predecessor: Dayton's
- Founded: 2017; 9 years ago Minneapolis, Minnesota
- Founder: George Draper Dayton (Dayton’s); The 601W Companies (The Dayton’s Project)
- Headquarters: Minneapolis, Minnesota
- Parent: The 601W Companies
- Subsidiaries: The Departments of Dayton’s

The Dayton’s Project is a mixed retail and office space located in downtown Minneapolis, Minnesota. It succeeded Dayton's at its downtown flagship store. The company was founded in 2017. It is known for continuing the 100 year tradition of window Christmas displays in downtown.
