= Southdale Center =

Shopping mall in Hennepin County, Minnesota, U.S.

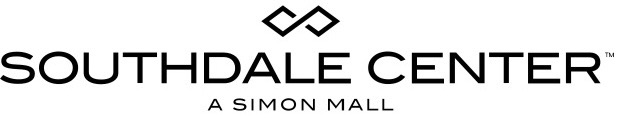

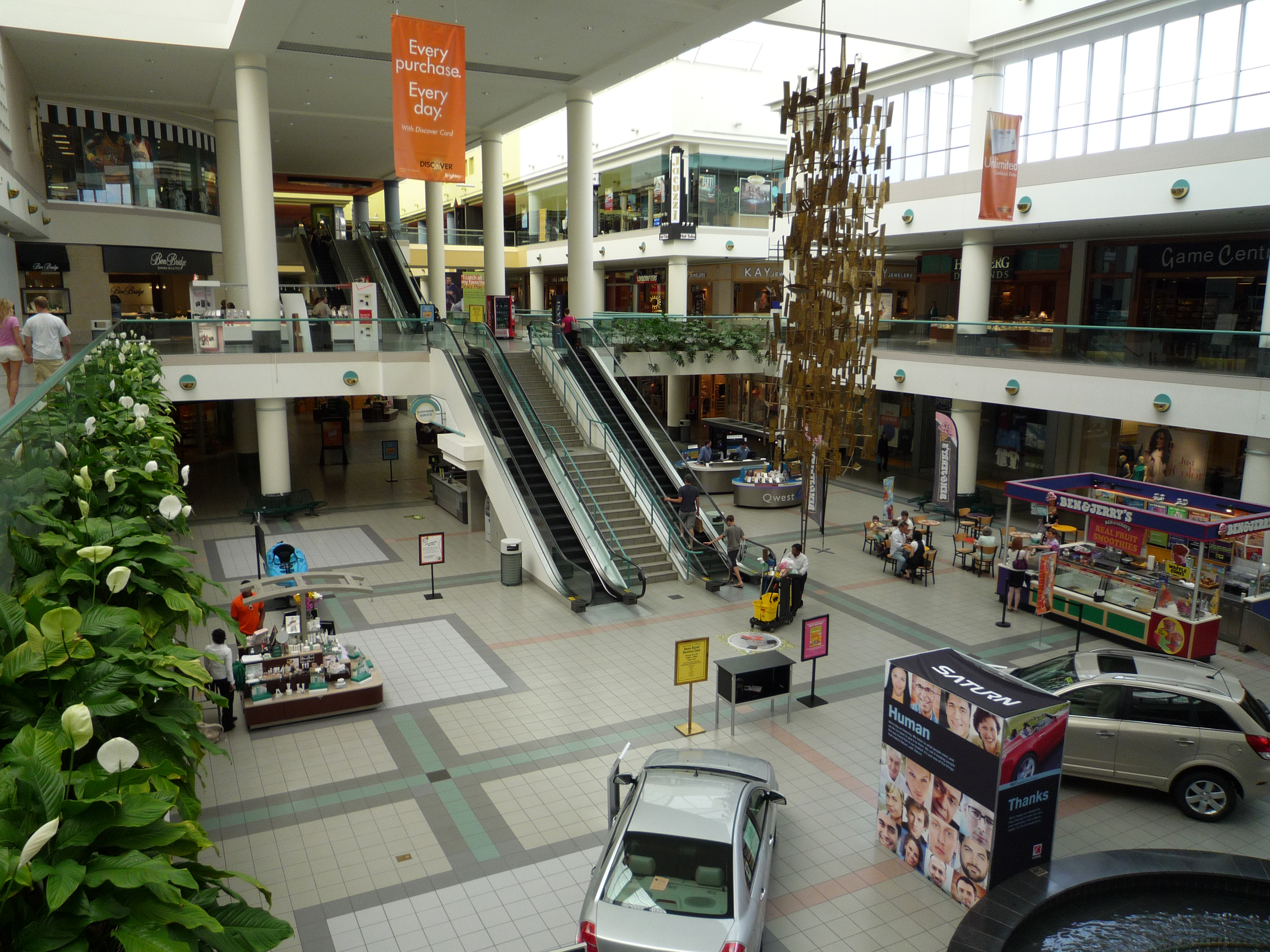
- View of the center court prior to 2012 renovation
- Location: Edina, Minnesota, U.S.
- Coordinates: 44°52′50″N 93°19′34″W
- Address: 6901 France Avenue South
- Opened: October 8, 1956; 70 years ago
- Developer: Dayton Company (now Target Corporation)
- Manager: Simon Property Group
- Owner: Simon Property Group
- Architect: Victor Gruen
- Num. of stores: 112
- Num. of anchor tenants: 5
- Floor area: 1,297,608 square feet (120,551.7 m^{2}; 29.7890 acres; 12.05517 ha)
- Floors: 4
- Public transit: Metro Transit: E, 36, 515, 537, 538, 578; SouthWest Transit: 600
- Website: Official website

Southdale Center is a super-regional shopping mall located in Edina, Minnesota, a suburb of the Twin Cities. It opened in 1956 and is the first fully enclosed, climate-controlled shopping mall in the United States. Southdale Center has 1,297,608 square feet (120,551.7 m^{2}; 29.7890 acres; 12.05517 ha) of leasable retail space, and contains 106 retail tenants. The mall is owned by Simon Property Group, and major tenants include Macy's, Dave & Buster's, AMC Theatres, Life Time Athletic, Kowalski's, and the Hennepin County Service Center.

Victor Gruen, the center's architect, designed the mall to challenge the car-centric America that was rising in the 1950s. Since its opening in 1956, Southdale has suffered through high vacancy rates and several store closures, but has been able to recover in recent years. Several additions have been performed on the building, including a 2011 renovation which involved the construction of a brand new food court. Southdale Center continues to use much of its original structure despite these renovations, and has been the host of several charity and community events throughout the years.

== History ==
=== Background ===
In 1943, architects Victor Gruen and Elsie Krummeck were asked to submit a proposal to envision a prototype of what a shopping center would ideally look like after World War II for "Architecture 194X", a competition in the Architectural Forum magazine. Prototypes by the pair emphasized the communal aspects of their proposed shopping center where services like the public library and the post office could be incorporated with the functions of retail. They also strived to make the centers visually appealing and inviting to encourage shoppers to stay longer.

While stranded in Detroit during a snowstorm in 1948, Gruen approached Oscar Webber, head of Hudson's, the second largest department store in the nation at the time (behind Macy's in Manhattan). Gruen asked Webber to help fund a shopping center in the suburbs of Detroit with Hudson's as the main draw. Webber initially declined, but a year later Hudson's agreed to finance a set of malls including Northland Center as customers moved out of the city and into the suburbs.

=== 1952–1957: Development and opening ===
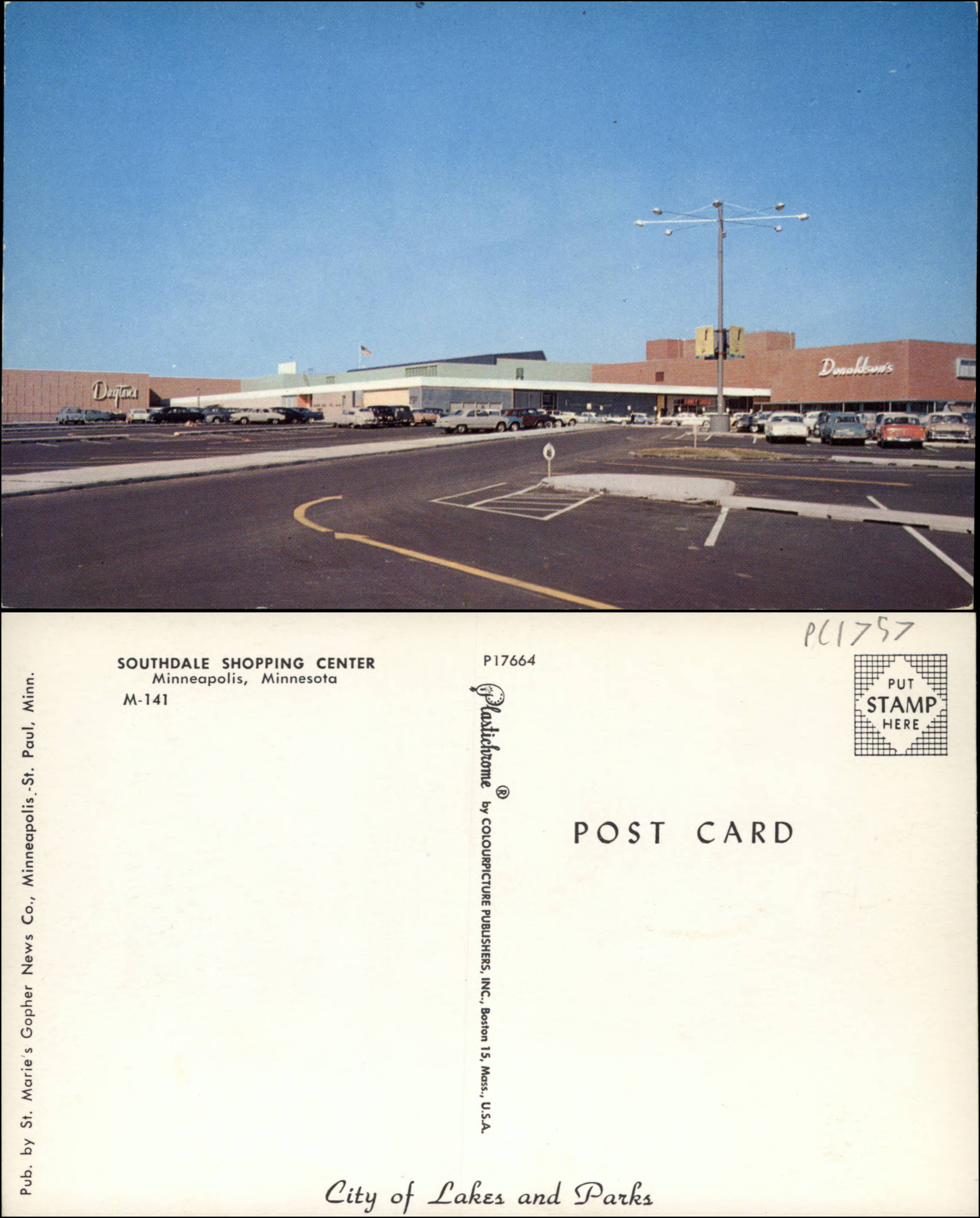
1960s postcard of the exterior

Through Oscar Webber, Gruen was introduced to the Dayton family, who owned an eponymous chain of stores after their father's death and were looking to expand and build a shopping center to accompany one of their stores in Edina, Minnesota. Webber insisted that the Dayton family work with Gruen to assist in their efforts. On June 17, 1952, the first plans unveiled for the shopping center were announced by Gruen and Donald Dayton, president of Dayton's. They estimated the cost to build the shopping center to be around $10 million. Public response to the announcement was generally positive, with many hailing the project as a utopia. In a near unanimous vote by the city of Edina, zoning ordinances were changed to constitute the mall.

Gruen was a European-style socialist; he found individual stores in downtown venues to be inefficient, and the suburban lifestyle of 1950s America too "car-centric" and wanted to design a building that would be a communal gathering place, where people would shop, drink coffee, and socialize, as he remembered from his native Vienna. Southdale Center was loosely modeled on the arcades of several heavily populated European cities and purposely included "eye-level display cases" to "lure customers into stores". Gruen imagined that Southdale would eventually include "a medical center, schools and residences, not just a parade of glitzy stores." In a statement to the Minneapolis Sunday Tribune (now the Star Tribune), Gruen and his economic consultant Lawrence P. Smith described the regional shopping center as a place that could "take care of today's needs and today's living" and would bring the community together by providing "a new outlet for that primary human instinct to mingle with other humans." The neighborhood surrounding the center was specifically built to accompany the mall.

Groundbreaking for Southdale took place on October 29, 1954; 800 construction workers were needed to build the three-story, 800,000 sq ft (74,000 m^{2}; 18-acre; 7.4 ha), 500-acre (200 ha) center, which had 5,200 parking spaces, 72 available tenants, and cost $20 million to construct. Due to Minnesota's harsh climate in the winter, Gruen constructed the center with a roof and air-conditioning system capable of maintaining a comfortable temperature of 75 °F (24 °C; 297 K) year-round. The mall was originally anchored by Dayton's and Donaldson's. Over 40,000 visitors attended the grand opening ceremony for the center on the morning of October 8, 1956. An additional 188,000 customers visited the mall throughout the following week.

The center was constructed to successfully bring the community together by "gathering art, culture, and entertainment under one roof with retail." The Dayton's store was modeled after Dayton's flagship store in Minneapolis, Minnesota. In November 1956, organic architect Frank Lloyd Wright visited the mall as part of a tour of new buildings in Minnesota; he critiqued Southdale's overall design, stating "[the] garden court has all the evils of the village street and none of its charm", further criticizing several other buildings in nearby Minneapolis. He unfavorably added that Gruen "should have left downtown, downtown."

=== 1958–1990: Additions, JCPenney opens, and new competition ===
Over the early years of Southdale, several tenants and restaurants opened in the center. A restaurant called Sidewalk Cafe was an "outdoor"-themed restaurant, even though the venue was fully enclosed; Sidewalk Cafe was the first restaurant of its kind. JCPenney announced their interest in opening a location at Southdale Center. An addition to the mall was constructed, allowing JCPenney to open a 247,902-square-foot (23,030.8 m^{2}; 5.6910-acre; 2.30308 ha) store in 1972; it became Southdale's third anchor store, following Dayton's and Donaldson's. Along with the new anchor store came an entire new mall corridor connecting JCPenney to the original structure of the mall.

During 1976, construction of a new shopping center directly across the street from Southdale occurred. The construction resulted in the Galleria Edina, an upscale shopping center; the new shopping mall increased competition with neighboring shopping centers. In 1987, Donaldson's announced the discontinuation of their chain of stores, which would shut one of the mall's original anchors. Instead, Donaldson's merged with Chicago-based department chain Carson Pirie Scott.

=== 1991–2008: Expansion, Dayton's merger, and store closures ===
In 1991, Dayton's announced plans to construct a significantly larger store directly north of their current location. These plans included the demolition of the original Dayton's store to be replaced with more stores, plus a larger "garden court", and the construction of various multi-level parking garages; these plans were eventually constructed and finalized in the early 1990s. On June 30, 1997, Southdale Center was sold to the O'Connor Group, a New York-based real estate company for $125 million. Around this time, Southdale converted most of its basement into a singular anchor store, which became Marshalls; surrounding the new anchor were several specialty shops and mall management offices. Dayton's acquired Marshall Field's and rebranded with the Marshall Field's nameplate in 2001.

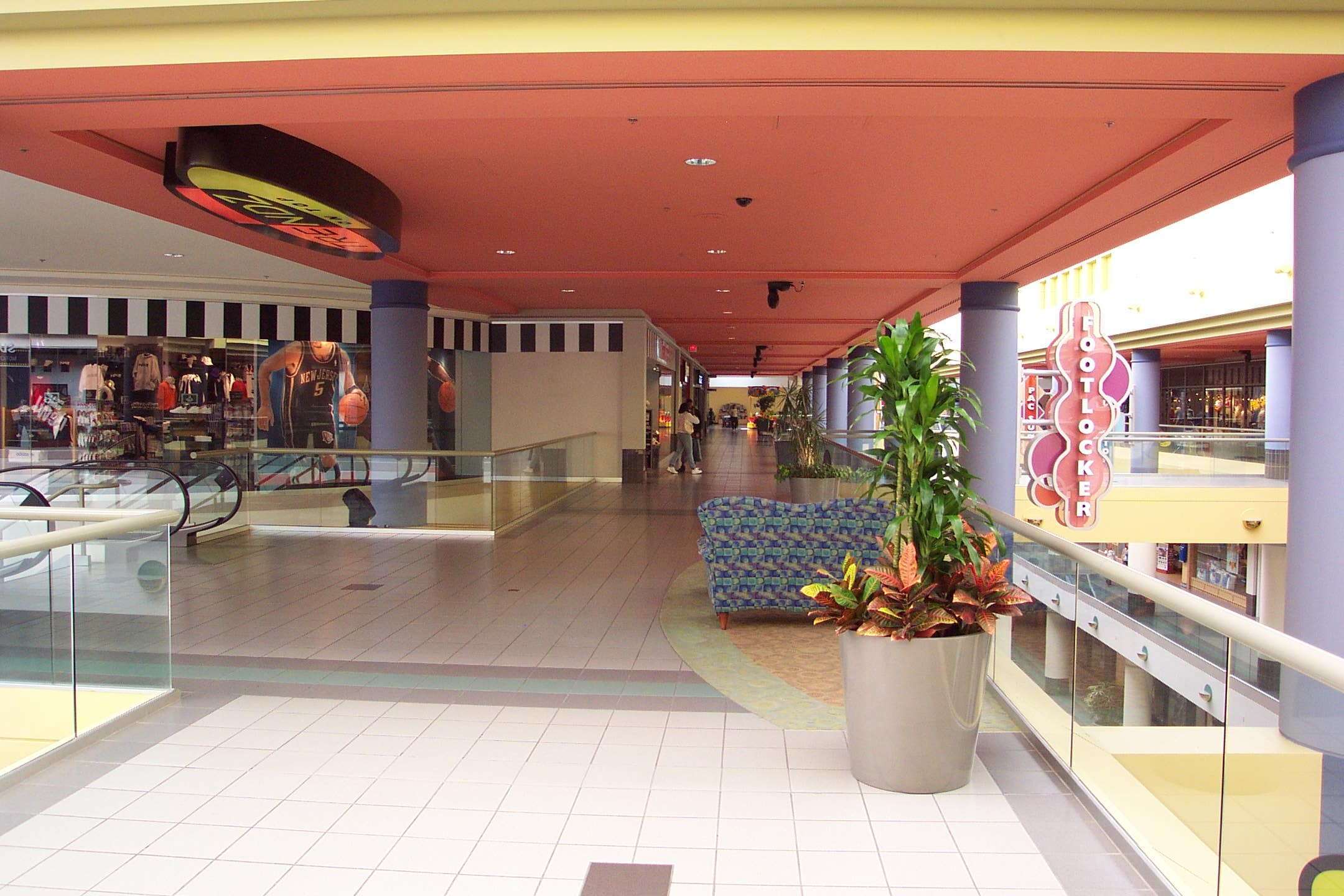
The former Trendz on Top area located on the third level (October 2005)

During the early 2000s, following fear of competition from nearby Eden Prairie Center and Mall of America, Southdale announced further plans to renovate the center again. A complete remodeling of the center occurred in 2001, followed by a large addition to the southern half of the property; the addition included a sixteen-screen movie theater along with an entertainment district of restaurants and shops called "The District on France". "The District on France" included several "upscale" dining options, including California Pizza Kitchen, The Cheesecake Factory, and Maggiano's Little Italy. A renovation of the less-traveled third floor also occurred, with the addition of teen-geared stores; this addition was called "Trendz on Top".

Throughout the mid-2000s, Southdale began struggling with maintaining a low vacancy rate. The May Department Stores Company acquired Marshall Field's in 2004, and promptly closed the Twin Cities area Mervyn's. After the closure of Mervyn's in 2004, several tenants followed and ended their leases as well; national retailers like Bombay Company, Crate & Barrel, Ritz Camera, and Select Comfort all announced closures of their Southdale locations. Talks of a Dick's Sporting Goods filling the space formerly leased by Mervyn's occurred, but those plans never took off and eventually dissolved. In 2006, Marshall Fields was rebranded as Macy's.

=== 2009–2016: Ongoing renovations ===
External videos
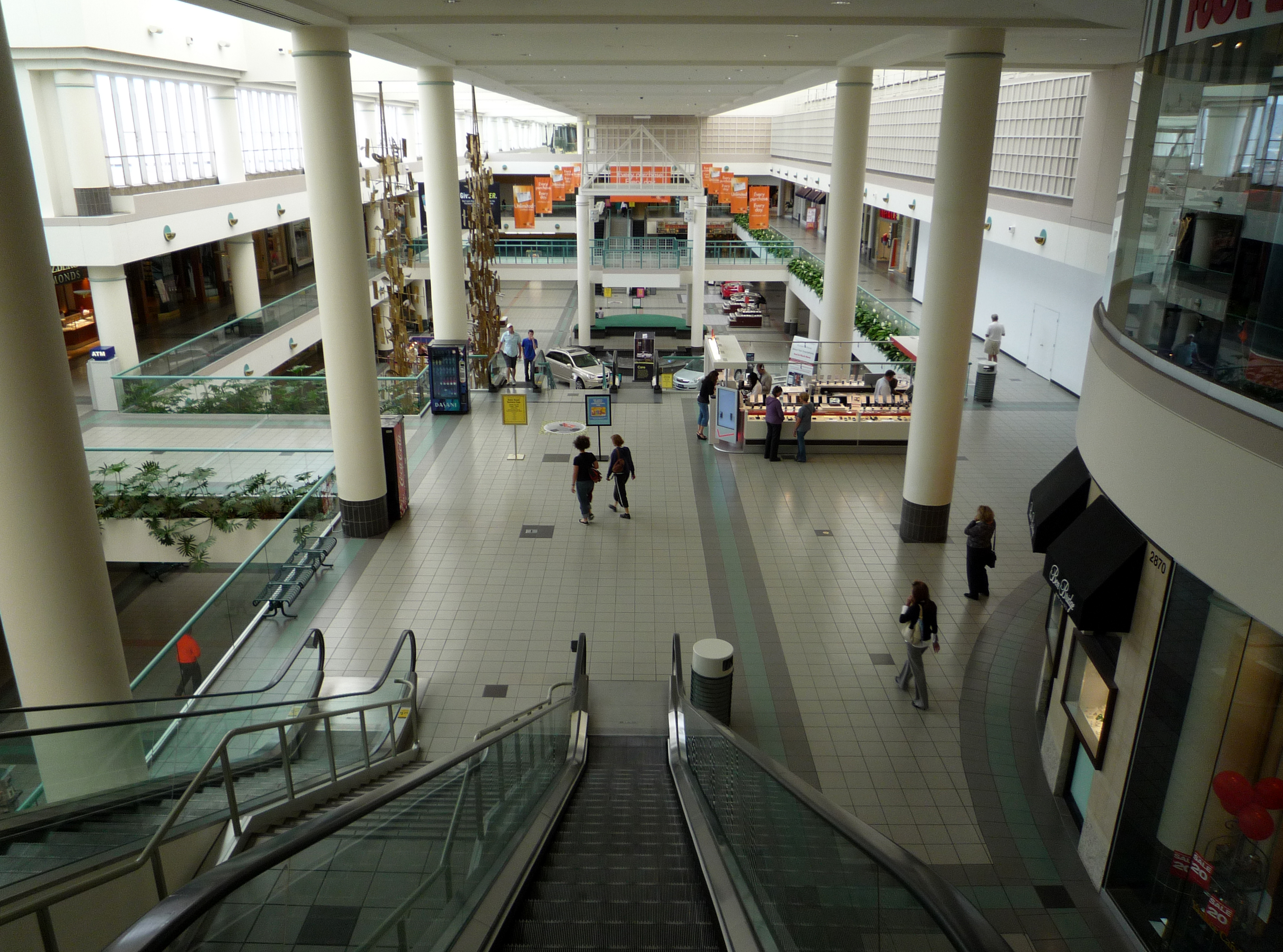
- Buildings that Changed America #8 Southdale Center, WTTW

In February 2011, Simon Property Group announced that Southdale would soon be anchored by Herberger's, a local department store chain, and would lease the space previously used by Mervyn's. Along with this announcement came the mention of a brand new food court to replace the nearly vacant one on the less-traveled third floor, a housing development consisting of apartments and condominiums, and expanded retail. The food court's construction would include six tenants, which was later increased to eight tenants. However, the new food court forced the closure of one of Southdale's oldest tenants, Ralph's Shoe Service, which originally opened at the mall in 1957. Following several tenant terminations, the mall's Marshalls anchor announced that their 40,000 square feet (3,700 m^{2}; 0.92 acres; 0.37 ha) Southdale location would move to a different shopping center in Bloomington, Minnesota.

The new food court located by JCPenney was completed in 2012 and featured "upscale" dining options, such as Qdoba Mexican Grill and Smashburger; several other projects took place, such as cosmetic changes for the mall and the construction of new corridors. Since 2015, several stores and businesses have opened up locations at Southdale Center. Gordmans, a Nebraska-based discount retailer, filled the vacancy previously leased by Marshalls in July 2015; however closed just two years later after filing bankruptcy. Other new openings were a 41,500-square-foot (3,860 m^{2}; 0.95-acre; 0.386 ha) Dave and Buster's restaurant, filling the vacancy of the original food court. A Homewood Suites by Hilton resort was approved by the City of Edina and constructed in the shopping center's northeast parking lot in late 2016.

=== 2017–2022 ===
JCPenney closed in 2017 as part of a major store closure wave from the department store. The former JCPenney building was later demolished and replaced by a Life Time Fitness complex, which opened in 2019.

Herberger's closed in 2018, as part of a bankruptcy liquidation of parent company The Bon-Ton. Throughout the late 2010s, new development began appearing around Southdale as mall owner Simon Property Group began a $400 million redevelopment project. One Southdale Place, a luxury apartment complex, opened on the mall's southeastern corner in phases beginning in 2014.. A Shake Shack restaurant and a Homewood Suites hotel opened on the northwestern and northeastern corners of the property opened in 2018. An RH gallery, with a rooftop restaurant, opened in 2019.

Plans for a branch of the Hennepin County Library to move into the vacant Herberger's building were announced in 2019, but were halted the following year.

=== 2023–present: Anchor redevelopment and mall renovations ===
New redevelopment plans for the former Herberger's building were disclosed in 2023, with a Kowalski's supermarket and Puttshack, an indoor mini-golf entertainment center, planned for the building's second and third floors. These new additions opened in late 2024.

A major interior renovation of Southdale began in 2023, with the goal of reshuffling the mall's interior to accommodate 50 new stores. The District on France dining area, which had become mostly vacant, was reconfigured to accommodate a luxury wing including three tenants poached from the nearby Galleria Edina: Louis Vuitton, Tiffany & Co., and David Yurman. The luxury wing opened in 2025, with other new and relocated tenants opening within the mall in 2026. In the summer of 2026, a restaurant called Smithson began construction in the remaining space of the former Express, with an external entrance only and is expected to open in October of the same year. The restaurant is owned by Kowalski's.
