= Loring Greenway =

Pedestrian greenway in Minneapolis

Coordinates: 44°58′16″N 93°16′47″W

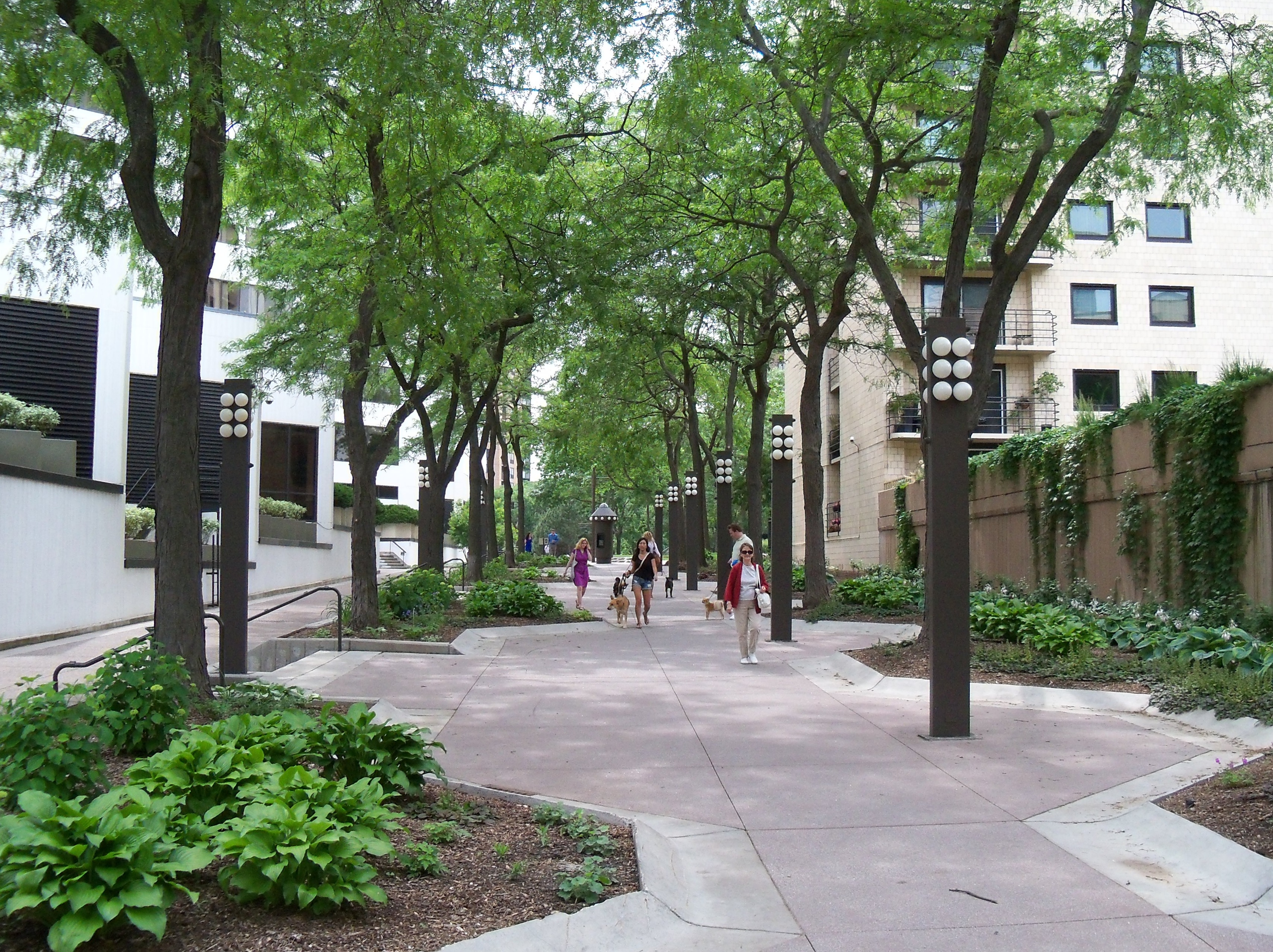
Loring Greenway photograph from Panoramio.

Loring Greenway is a 1,500-foot linear greenway in downtown Minneapolis that connects Nicollet Mall with Loring Park. It was designed by landscape architect M. Paul Friedberg, who also designed Peavey Plaza near the Nicollet Mall end of the greenway.

Opened in 1979, it was part of the Loring Park Development District that razed older properties, created the adjacent Hyatt hotel and built new surrounding multi-family apartment and townhouse buildings in the Loring Park neighborhood. The greenway is noted on a historic marker in a series along the north side of West Grant Street between LaSalle and Nicollet.

Larry Millett called the greenway "the most notable public amenity" in the Loring Park Development District. In the book Intown Living: A Different American Dream, authors Ann Breen and Dick Rigby highlighted the contrast of the lush greenway and its quiet with the "hard-edged" and relatively treeless Nicollet Mall.

== Characteristics ==
The Modernist-style greenway includes two fountains, one at the Nicollet Mall entrance and one halfway along the greenway. The public space also includes seating areas and a playground and is lit at night with custom distinctive lights. Part of the greenway is a land bridge over Lasalle Avenue. The Loring Park terminus is the Berger dandelion fountain. Two extensions connect the greenway to Spruce Place and 13th Street.

The Nicollet Mall entrance hosts George Morrison's "Tableau," a granite pavement mosaic on Nicollet Mall. This work was moved to the location by the greenway after sitting in two other locations on Nicollet Mall; the greenway entrance was thought to be lesser impact on the artwork.

Approximately 2,500 housing units flank the greenway spine. Originally, retail businesses were planned to line the greenway, but private development focused on residential spaces and the small commercial spaces never materialized.

Friedberg intended for the greenway to be like a procession and wished to establish a community of people along it. In an interview with Charles Birnbaum in 2006, he claimed, "We're in this together. This is how you get to the park. That's the event. This is the procession to the event. There are minor events, and make use of it. That's what we want you to do. You're part of a city."

The greenway sees high pedestrian traffic. In 2018, the mall end of the greenway had 2,850 estimated daily pedestrians and 410 bicyclists.

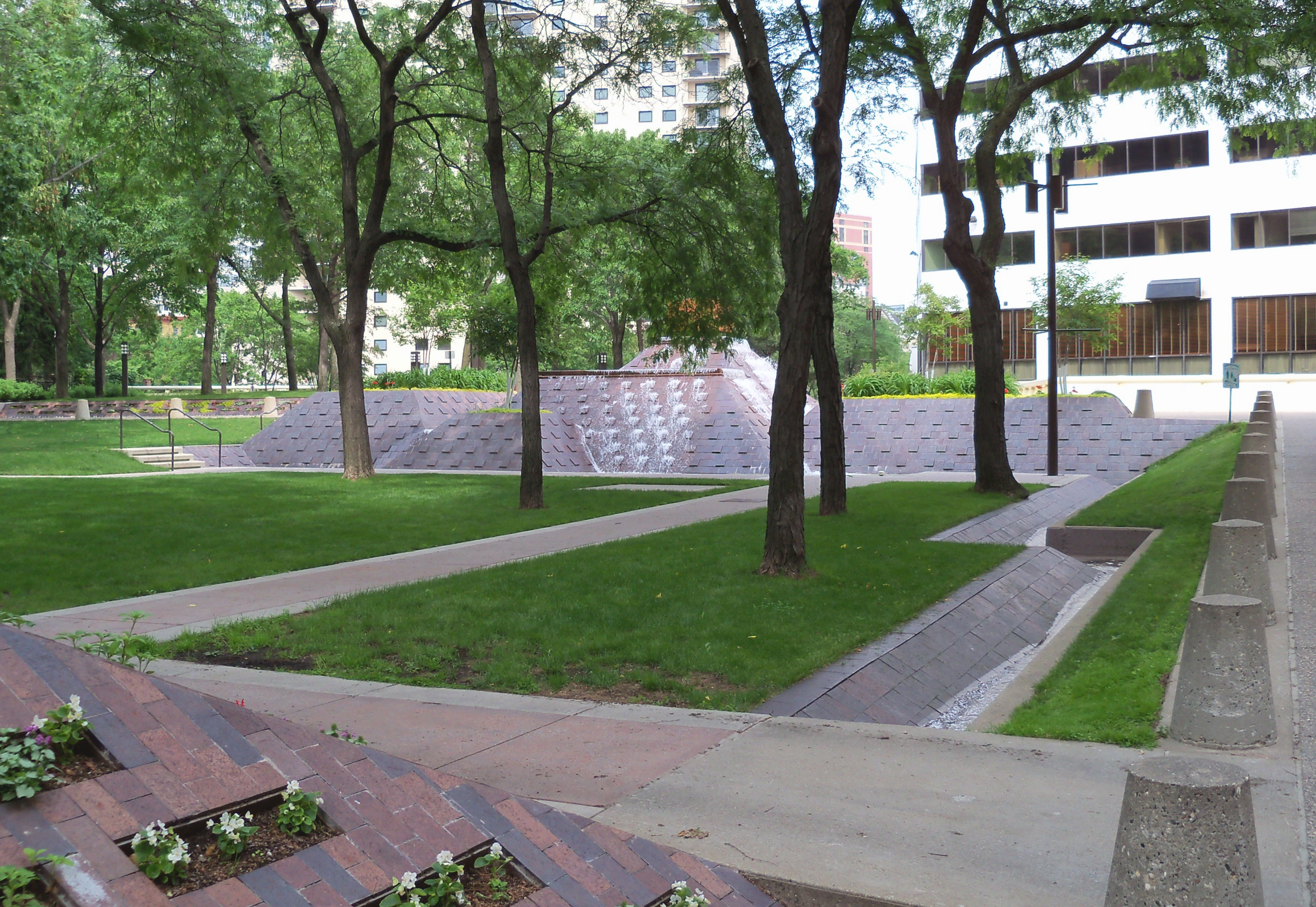
Loring Greenway Fountain (via Panoramio).

== Maintenance and restoration ==
Restoration of the greenway's original distinctive lights in the early 2000s was hailed by architectural historian Charlene Roise as an example of the city being "capable to do it right," in contrast to how the city had been maintaining Friedberg's nearby Peavey Plaza. In 2007, restoration work addressed deteriorating brick and concrete, plantings, and lighting.

The nonprofit Loring Greenway Association (LGA) works with volunteers to manage the plantings along the greenway and provides tables and chairs for public use during warmer weather. The Minneapolis Downtown Improvement District has regularly recognized their gardening work. In 2023, the greenway won the Best Large Green Space award for the seventh time in a row in the annual Greening and Public Realm Awards from the Downtown Improvement District. LGA also organizes free concerts on the greenway in the summer.

The city's Public Works department maintains the fountains and property overall. The greenway is slated for maintenance work in 2028 or 2029.

== 2024 playground removal and 2025 replacement ==
In November 2024, the city's Public Works department completely removed the greenway's well-used playground with no explanation to the community. The Loring Greenway Association was only provided a week's notice before the demolition, and the neighborhood organization, Citizens for a Loring Park Community, was not notified at all. The existing playground had been installed in 2003 using $60,000 from the city's Neighborhood Revitalization program. When the greenway originally opened, it had a playground as part of the original design, as shown in a 1979 photo from the city's archives as a neighboring apartment building was under construction.

After pushback from the community about the playground removal, the city initially worked with a playground designer on conceptual designs in early 2025. In September 2025, then City Council member Katie Cashman announced the city had identified an opportunity to have different playground equipment installed sooner than the initial designs would have been able to be done. The new playground was installed in October 2025 and opened on October 25, 2025.
