= Nicollet Avenue =

Street in Minnesota, United States

Coordinates: 44°58′35″N 93°16′22″W

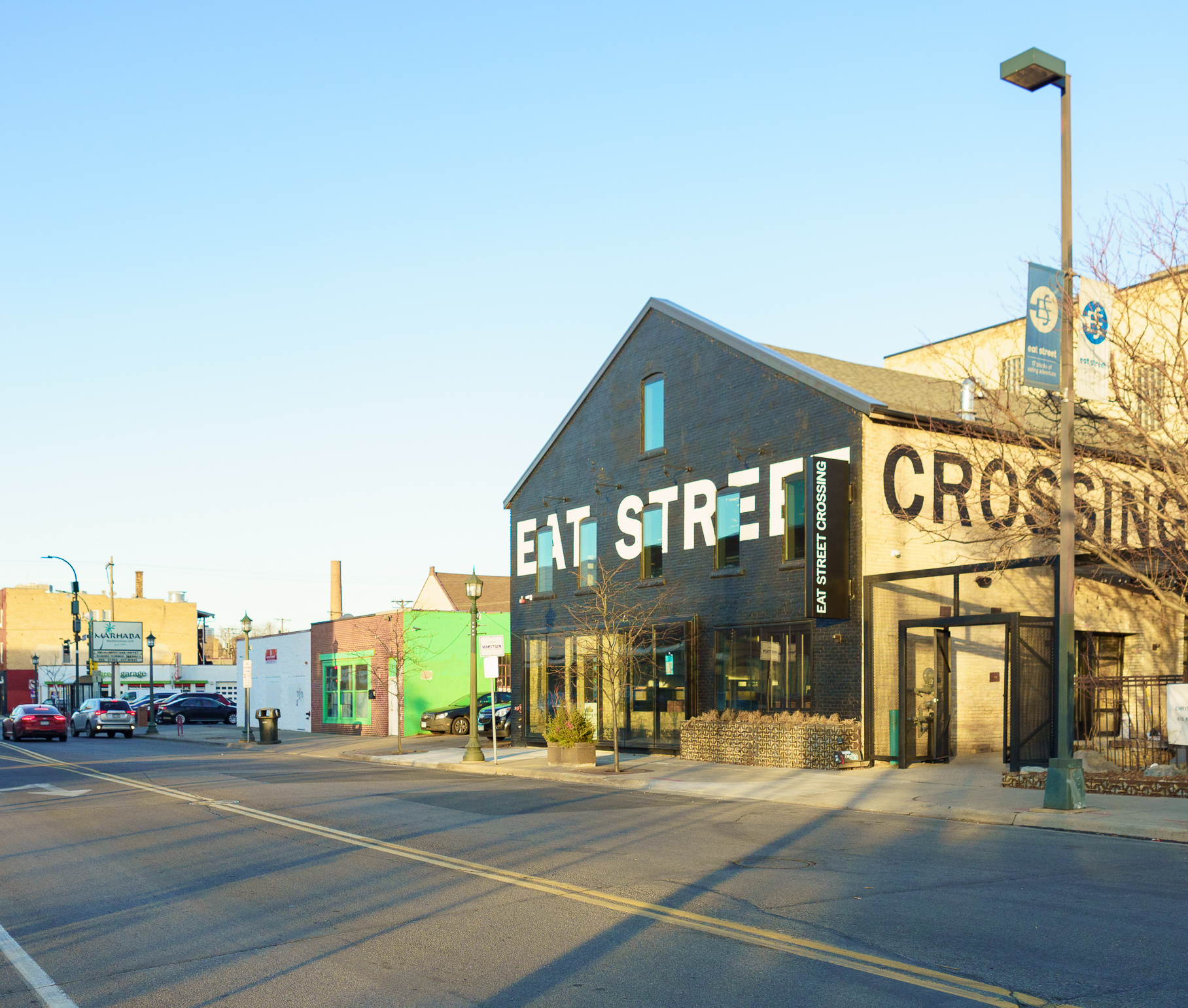
- Eat Street
- Interactive map of Nicollet Avenue
- Namesake: Joseph Nicollet
- Type: Avenue
- Location: Minneapolis, Richfield, Bloomington, Burnsville, Minnesota
- North end: Grant Street (Minneapolis, near Loring Park)
- Major junctions: Lake Street, Minnesota State Highway 62
- South end: County Road 42 (Burnsville)

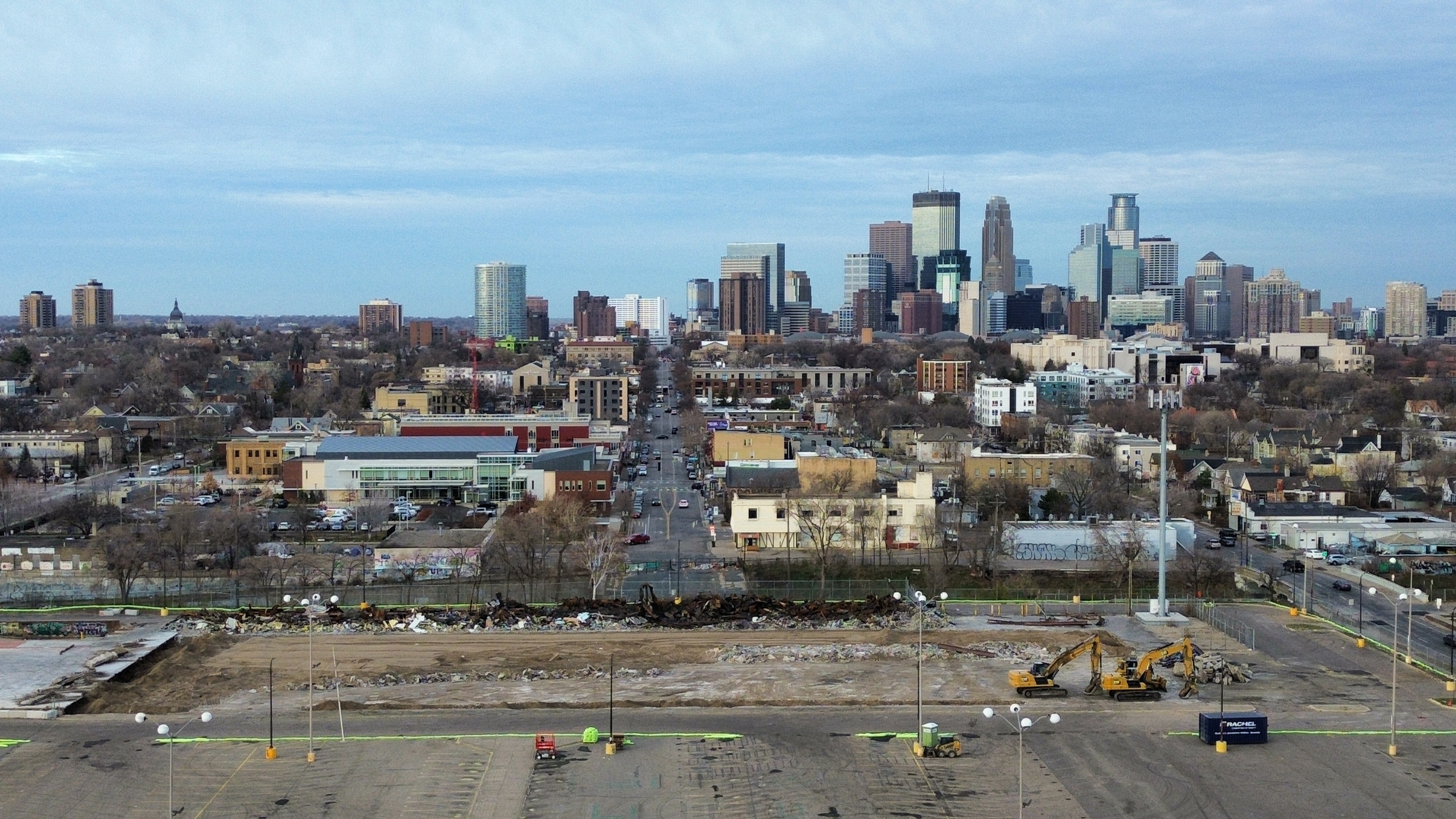
Nicollet Avenue looking north towards downtown Minneapolis with the former Kmart site in the foreground.

Nicollet Avenue (/ˈnɪkəlɪt/ NIH-kə-lit) is a major street in Minneapolis, Richfield, Bloomington, and Burnsville in the U.S. state of Minnesota. It passes through a number of locally well-known neighborhoods and districts, notably Eat Street in south Minneapolis and the traffic-restricted Nicollet Mall in downtown Minneapolis.

== Route description ==
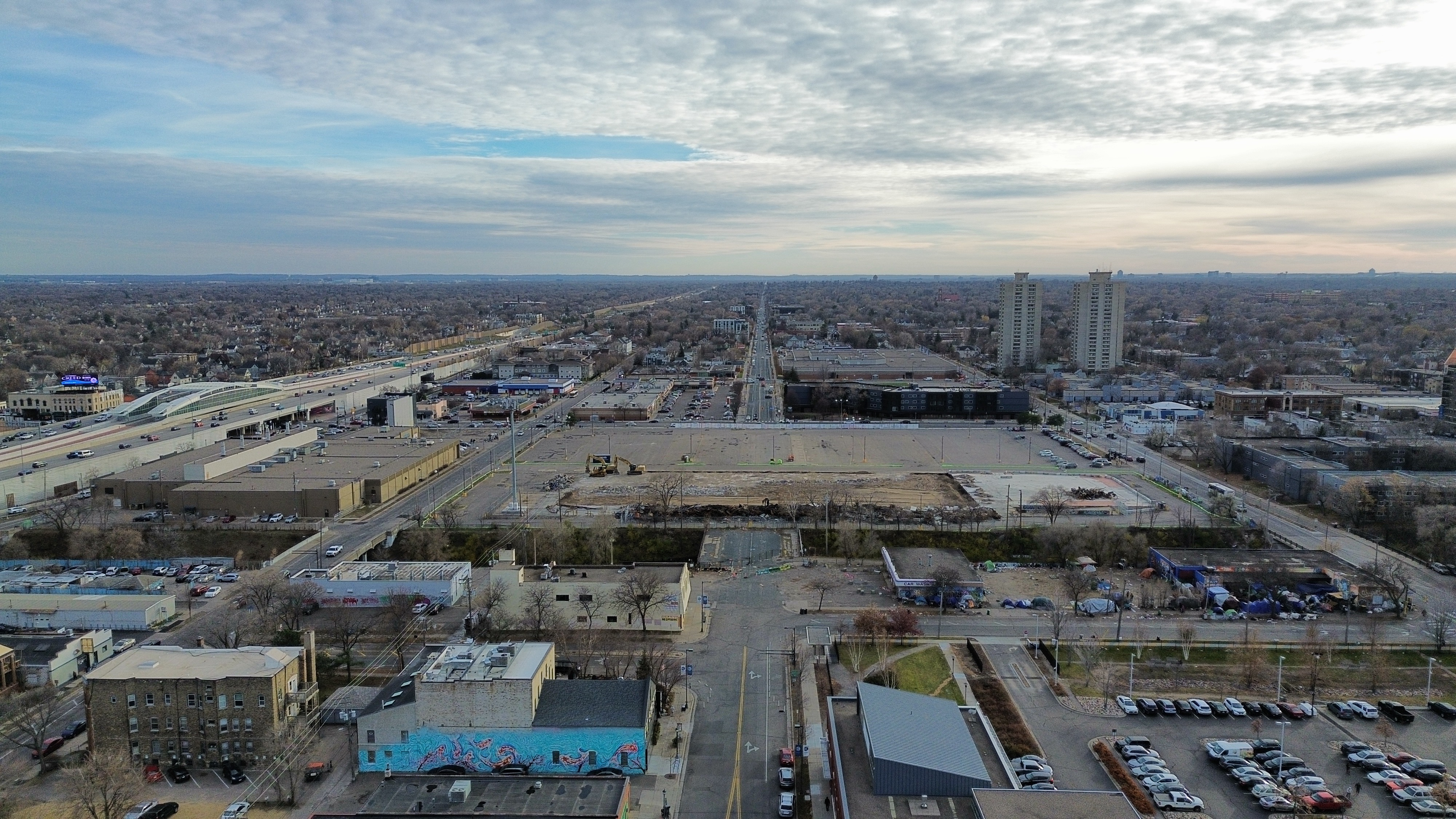
Nicollet Ave looking south from the Midtown Greenway.

The avenue begins at Grant Street in Loring Park and continues south to West 29th Street/Cecil B. Newman Lane, where it is interrupted by a Kmart store, and begins again at Lake Street, continuing through Richfield and Bloomington to 107th Street just north of the Minnesota River. Across the river in Burnsville, Nicollet begins again at Cliff Road West and ends at County Road 42. Nicollet is a major commercial street in Burnsville, forming one of two main streets of their Heart of the City downtown area.

Nicollet is a city street in Minneapolis and Burnsville, while it is designated as Hennepin County Road 52 between 98th Street in Bloomington and W 61st St in Minneapolis (just north of the Richfield border). This designation resumes on Hennepin Avenue in downtown Minneapolis, though the county highway is not contiguous.

== History ==
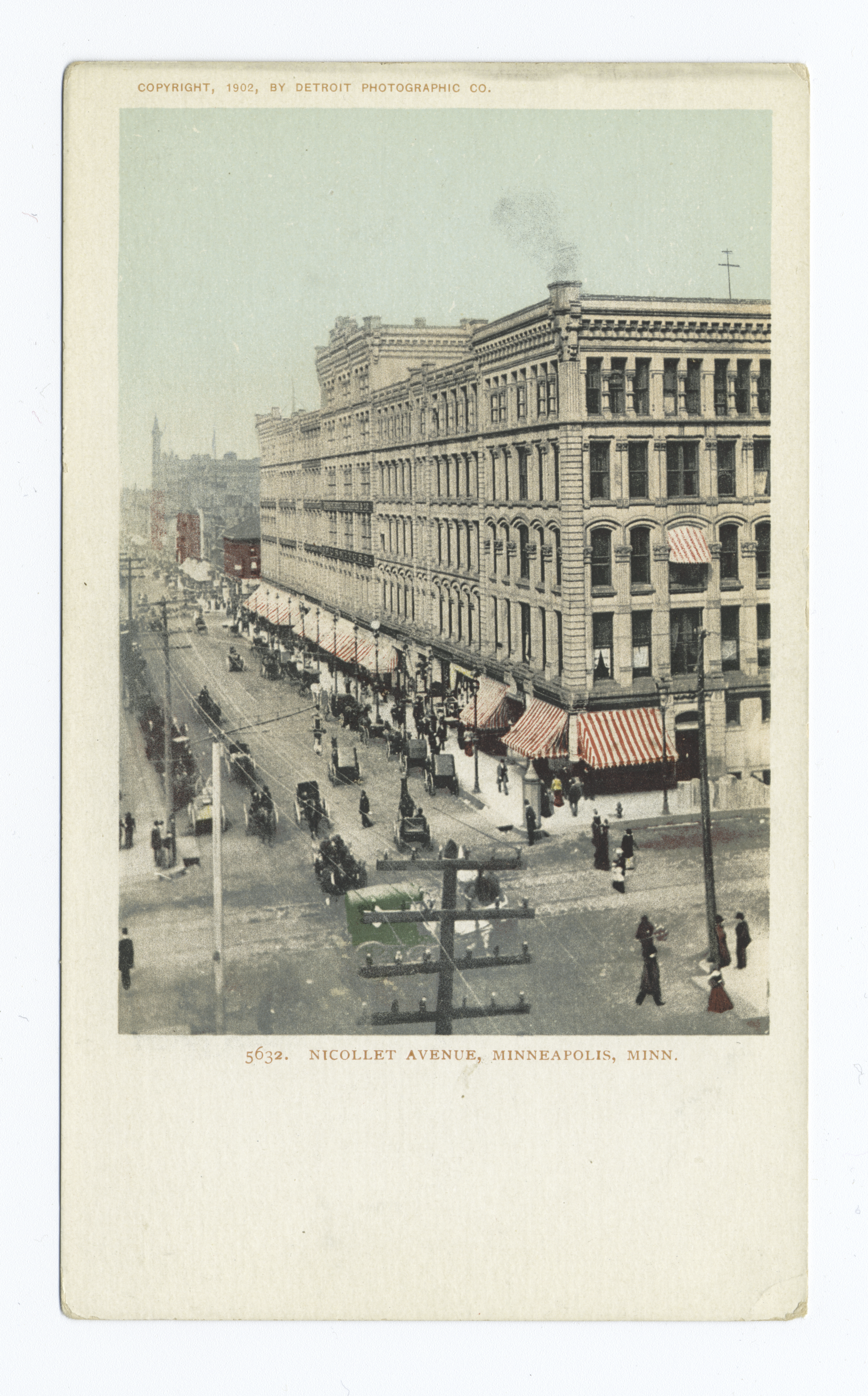
Early 20th century

Nicollet Avenue began as a military road between Saint Anthony Falls and Fort Snelling. It was named for early 19th-century French explorer and cartographer Joseph Nicollet, who led three expeditions in what is now Minnesota. Nicollet Mall occupies the oldest section of the avenue. Before the mall was constructed in 1967, Nicollet Avenue stretched from the Mississippi River to the Minnesota River.

One block of the street between 29th Street and Lake Street was removed in 1977 to build a Kmart store (opened in 1978) which covers two city blocks, detouring southbound traffic to Blaisdell Avenue and northbound traffic to First Avenue South.

The city of Minneapolis has planned to restore Nicollet Avenue by reconstructing the Kmart site into a new configuration that would include both commercial and residential development since at least 2010. After a building fire at the former Kmart in October 2023, the building was torn down in November 2023. The city of Minneapolis announced proposed street layouts for a reconnected Nicollet Ave in October 2023. Construction is expected to start in 2025.

On January 24, 2026, at around 9:05 a.m. CST, Alex Pretti was killed by multiple gunshots fired by United States Customs and Border Protection agents at the corner of 26th Street and Nicollet Avenue in Minneapolis. Crowds gathered at the scene in Minneapolis and protests spread to other cities, including New York City, San Francisco, Los Angeles, and Boston, with demonstrators criticizing the actions of federal agents and calling for accountability.

== Transit ==
The Dan Patch Line, a separate railroad serving communities as far south as Northfield, Minnesota, ran parallel to the streetcar line between 60th Street and Diamond Lake Road. Nicollet Station, a carhouse originally built for the Motor Line, was acquired and expanded by Twin City Rapid Transit; after the streetcar system was dismantled in 1953–1954, the carbarn has since been used for transit system buses. The station is located at Nicollet and 31st Street, just south of the site of the Minneapolis Millers' Nicollet Park baseball field, which closed in 1955.

The Metro Transit route 18 bus travels most of Nicollet Avenue. Historically, Nicollet had rail transportation, starting with the Minneapolis, Lyndale & Minnetonka Railway Co., also known as the "Motor Line". The Motor Line ran along Marquette Avenue in downtown Minneapolis, then turned west for one block at 13th Street South to reach Nicollet. The line was constructed south to 31st Street in 1879, to 37th Street in 1884, and was extended further south to 50th Street in 1887. It was converted to streetcar operation in 1890, and the Twin City Rapid Transit Company (TCRT) extended the route to Diamond Lake Road in 1911, 58th Street in 1928, and 62nd Street (now Minnesota State Highway 62) in 1947. Streetcars on the road had a service frequency of one every five minutes off-peak, and ran about twice as often during the morning and afternoon peak periods.

== In popular culture ==
In the 1970s, the avenue was used as a backdrop for the end of the famous opening sequence of The Mary Tyler Moore Show, in which a jubilant Moore tosses her hat into the air while watched by a curious group of passersby who were, in fact, real pedestrians and not extras.

On January 28, 2026, Bruce Springsteen released a protest song titled "Streets of Minneapolis" in response to Operation Metro Surge and that memorialized the lives of Alex Pretti and Renée Good, who had died in similar circumstances in Minneapolis on January 7, 2026. The opening lines of the song are, "Through the winter's ice and cold, down Nicollet Avenue".
