= Orchestra Hall (Minneapolis) =

Concert hall in Minneapolis, Minnesota, United States

- Interactive map of Orchestra Hall
- Address: 1111 Nicollet Mall
- Location: Minneapolis, Minnesota
- Coordinates: 44°58′20″N 93°16′30″W
- Capacity: 2,087
- Type: concert hall

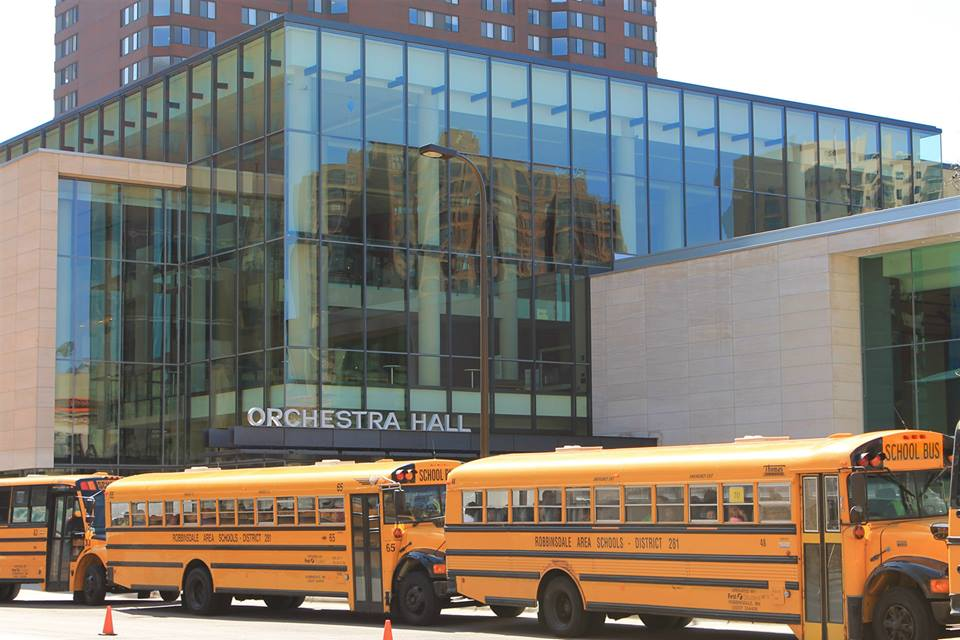
11th Street Orchestra Hall exterior

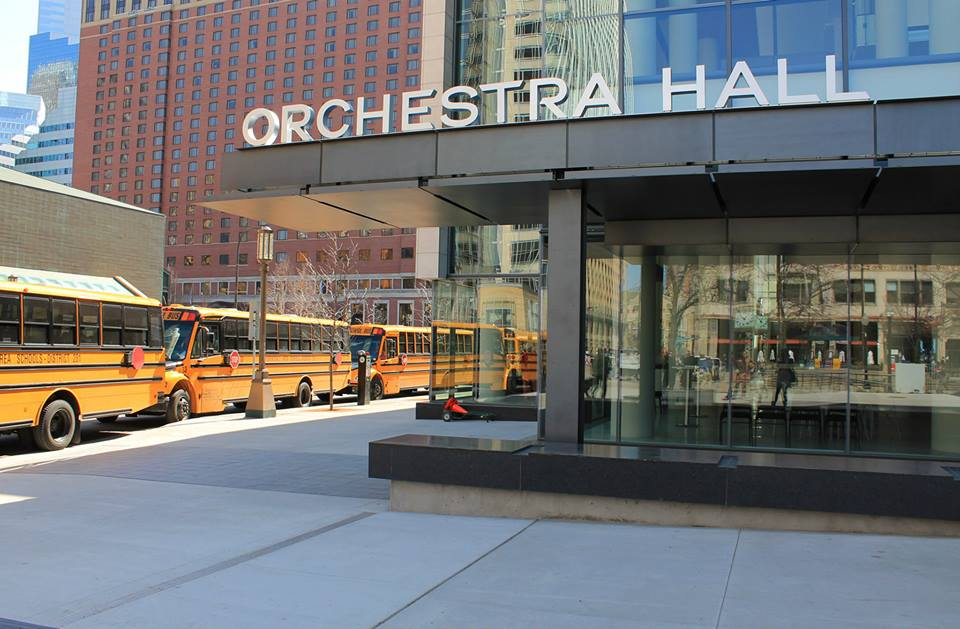
Orchestra Hall Peavey Plaza entrance area

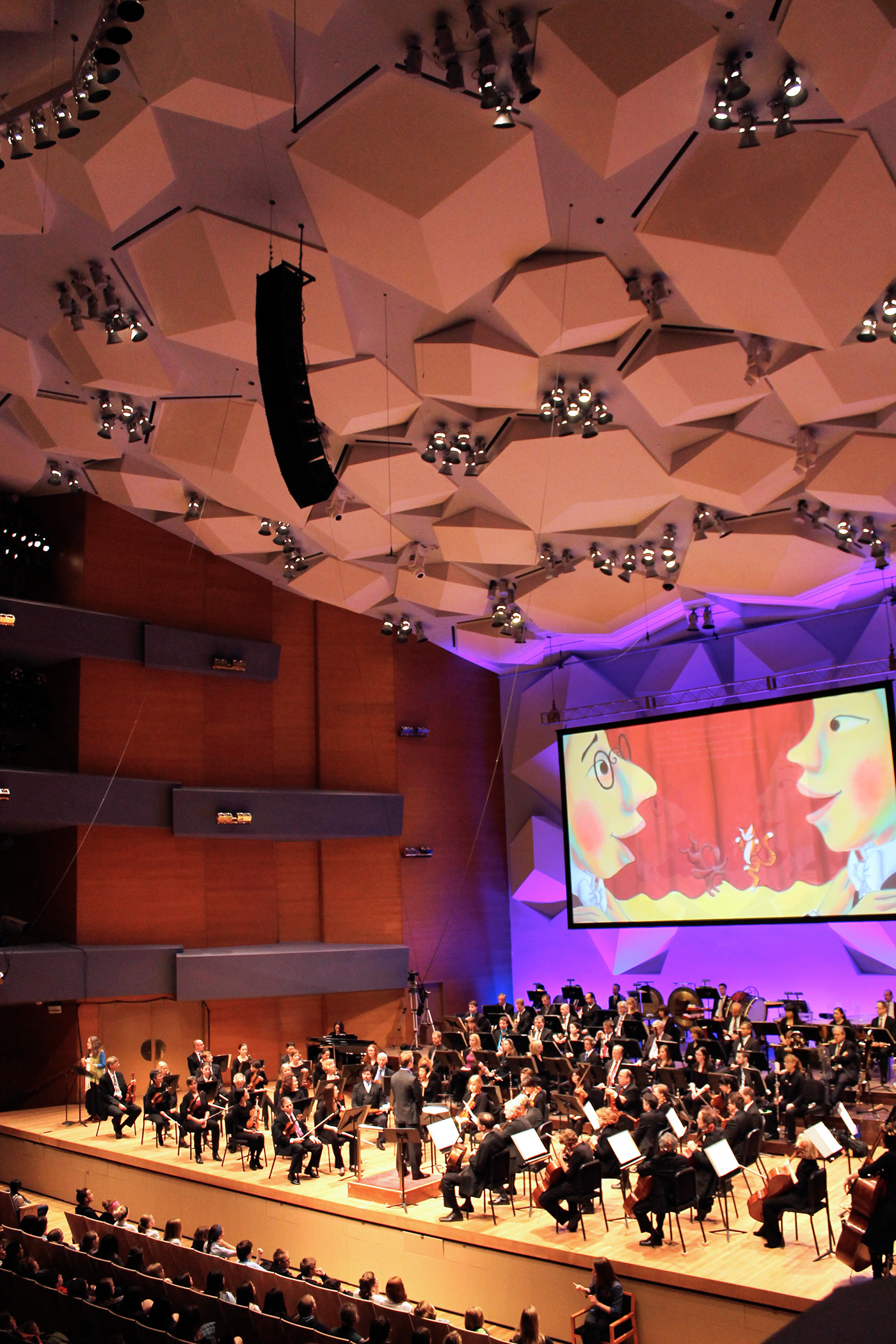
Interior shot of Orchestra Hall while the Minnesota Orchestra is playing

Orchestra Hall is a concert hall that is located on 11th Street at Peavey Plaza in downtown Minneapolis, Minnesota. The home of the Minnesota Orchestra, it is a major landmark of the southern portion of Nicollet Mall and hosts many events throughout the year.

The auditorium seats 2,089, of which about 1,200 are accommodated on the main floor. The remaining seats are placed in three balconies above and along the sides of the main floor. The auditorium is actually a second building separated for acoustical reasons by a one-inch gap from the "shell" which contains the lobby and various administrative offices. The stage contains an unusual feature: a large cube motif in the rear stage wall which continues along the ceiling towards the rear of the auditorium. The cubes were added for acoustic reasons, successfully, and turned out to be visually striking as well.

== History ==
The hall was designed by Hardy Holzman Pfeiffer Associates (New York City) with Hammel Green & Abrahamson (Minneapolis) and acoustical engineer Cyril Harris (New York City) and opened for the 1974 concert season.

Originally noted for its modernist design, chosen to represent an orchestra for everyone, not what was then perceived to be the formal "elitist" designs of the past. The exterior of the building was recognizable by its large, blue ventilation ducts. Their unusual size was chosen to reduce air velocity and hence noise. The lobby area's original "power plant" design was meant to remove tones of class and privilege from the symphony-going experience; it was upgraded in late 1997 and included several bars. Expansive windows overlooked the street.

Built in 1975, Peavey Plaza was designed by landscape architect M. Paul Friedberg who also designed the Loring Greenway. The plaza holds an amphitheater and water fountain, and is considered one of the endangered historic properties in Minnesota.

== Renovation ==
In April 2007, it was announced that the hall would be undergoing a multimillion-dollar renovation. This renovation was to emphasize the lobby and patron areas.

On April 9, 2010, plans were revealed for a $40 million renovation and expansion. The lobby and public areas were doubled in size and the former utilitarian exterior was replaced with stone and glass. A grand new entrance was also added. KPMB of Toronto were the architects and MBJ of Minneapolis were the structural engineers. Construction began in June 2012 and was completed in June 2013. The lobby was doubled in size, a cross-aisle in the auditorium was added, and new and larger seats were installed, reducing their number by 365 for a total of 2085. A new atrium was added as were new rehearsal rooms, and the women's locker room was expanded.

== Acoustics ==
While aspects of the interior design in the auditorium had a mixed reception, the acoustics were highly praised, and called "almost too good to be true".
