= Charles A. Birnbaum =

Landscape preservationist (born 1961)

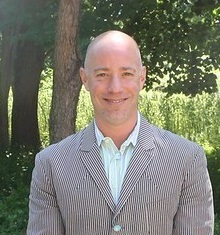
- Birnbaum in 2012
- Born: Charles Alan Birnbaum; 1961 (age 64–65)
- Education: State University of New York College of Environmental Science & Forestry, Bachelor in Landscape Architecture (BLA)
- Occupations: Non-profit president, author, professor
- Employer: The Cultural Landscape Foundation
- Known for: Landscape advocacy
- Awards: 2009 President's Medal, The American Society of Landscape Architects; 2007 LaGasse Medal, American Society of Landscape Architects for Public Service; 2004 Rome Prize in Historic Preservation & Conservation

Charles A. Birnbaum (born 1961) is a nationally recognized advocate for the study of American landscapes. He is the president and CEO of The Cultural Landscape Foundation (TCLF) in Washington, DC.

== Education and early career ==
Charles Alan Birnbaum graduated from the State University of New York College of Environmental Science and Forestry, receiving a Bachelor in Landscape Architecture in 1983. Before founding TCLF, Birnbaum spent fifteen years as the coordinator of the National Park Service Historic Landscape Initiative (HLI). In that position, he developed and helped implement the Secretary of the Interior's Standards for the Treatment of Historic Properties + Guidelines for the Treatment of Cultural Landscapes.

His experience includes ten years of private practice in New York City with a focus on landscape and urban design.

== Advocacy and education ==
Birnbaum is known for his advocacy to identify and protect significant landscapes threatened by erasure, neglect or alteration. He has led efforts to save more than 50 parks, landmarks and gardens through open dialogue and education. TCLF identifies at-risk properties each year as part of its Landslide initiative. "Sites can be at-risk for numerous reasons, ranging from an imminent threat of demolition to an accumulation of factors — storm damage, lack of resources for needed maintenance, vandalism, etc." Among the projects that Birnbaum and TCLF have recently flagged is the A. M. E. Zion Church in Rossville, Staten Island.

Another way that Birnbaum achieves consensus is through workshops where Birnbaum gathers members of the landscape community and the public together to discuss the interaction of the natural and the built environment. His first "Bridging the Nature Culture Divide Conference" was held in Rye, New York at the Jay Estate in 2011 and resulted in progress to reimagine historic gardens at the site in a sustainable manner. Subsequent forums were co-sponsored by the Central Park Conservancy (2012) and the Presidio Trust (2015).

Birnbaum's "What's Out There" program has also received attention. It has advanced from a website database of over 1350 landscapes to a sophisticated interface technology that can be accessed via a mobile phone.

In 2013, Birnbaum galvanized a group of advocates to stop the demolition of Peavey Plaza in Minneapolis and helped negotiate terms for the rehabilitation of the public space. Birnbaum garnered widespread attention when he and others condemned plans by the Frick Museum to eliminate what the museum termed a temporary 1977 Russell Page garden as part of their expansion plans in 2015. The garden was saved when Birnbaum produced a contradictory original document issued by the Frick clearly identifying the space as a permanent garden.

Through TCLF, he has brought the names of forgotten landscape designers and stewards, particularly women like Ruth Shellhorn, an advisor to Walt Disney, and Harlem Renaissance poet Anne Spencer, to the forefront. "Women have literally shaped the American landscape and continue to today, but their names and contributions are largely unknown."

In 2022, for the bicentennial of Frederick Law Olmsted's birth, Birnbaum issued an alert about the threats to a dozen of Olmsted's iconic green spaces noting the cumulatively negative impacts posed by climate change, coastal erosion and construction.

Birnbaum has made numerous media appearances, including several segments on Fox News opposing the Obama Presidential Center in Chicago.

== Publications, oral history modules and film ==
Birnbaum has written and edited numerous publications. His book Pioneers of American Landscape Design (2000), co-researched with Robin Karson and Laura Byers was called "the first of its kind in America." It is an encyclopedic catalog of landscape architects and public space planners and engineers. Other Birnbaum works include Shaping the American Landscape, Design with Culture: Claiming America's Landscape Heritage, Preserving Modern Landscape Architecture and its follow-up publication, Making Post-War Landscapes Visible. He has produced numerous oral history modules about practitioners in his field along with profiles of notable modern landscape architects like James van Sweden, Cornelia Hahn Oberlander, Lawrence Halprin and Paul Friedberg.

== Fellowships and awards ==
Birnbaum is a Fellow of the American Society of Landscape Architects (ASLA) and the American Academy in Rome. In 2008, he was the visiting Glimcher Distinguished Professor at Ohio State's Austin E. Knowlton School of Architecture and was also awarded the Alfred B. LaGasse Medal from the ASLA. Birnbaum is also the recipient of the 2017 ASLA Medal and a Garden Club of America awardee in 2020.

Birnbaum teaches at the Harvard Graduate School of Design, where he was a Loeb Fellow (1997–98), and has been a visiting professor at Columbia Graduate School of Architecture, Planning and Preservation (GSAPP).

== See also ==
- Conservation and restoration of immovable cultural property
