= Nicollet Mall =

Shopping, transit and pedestrian space in Minneapolis

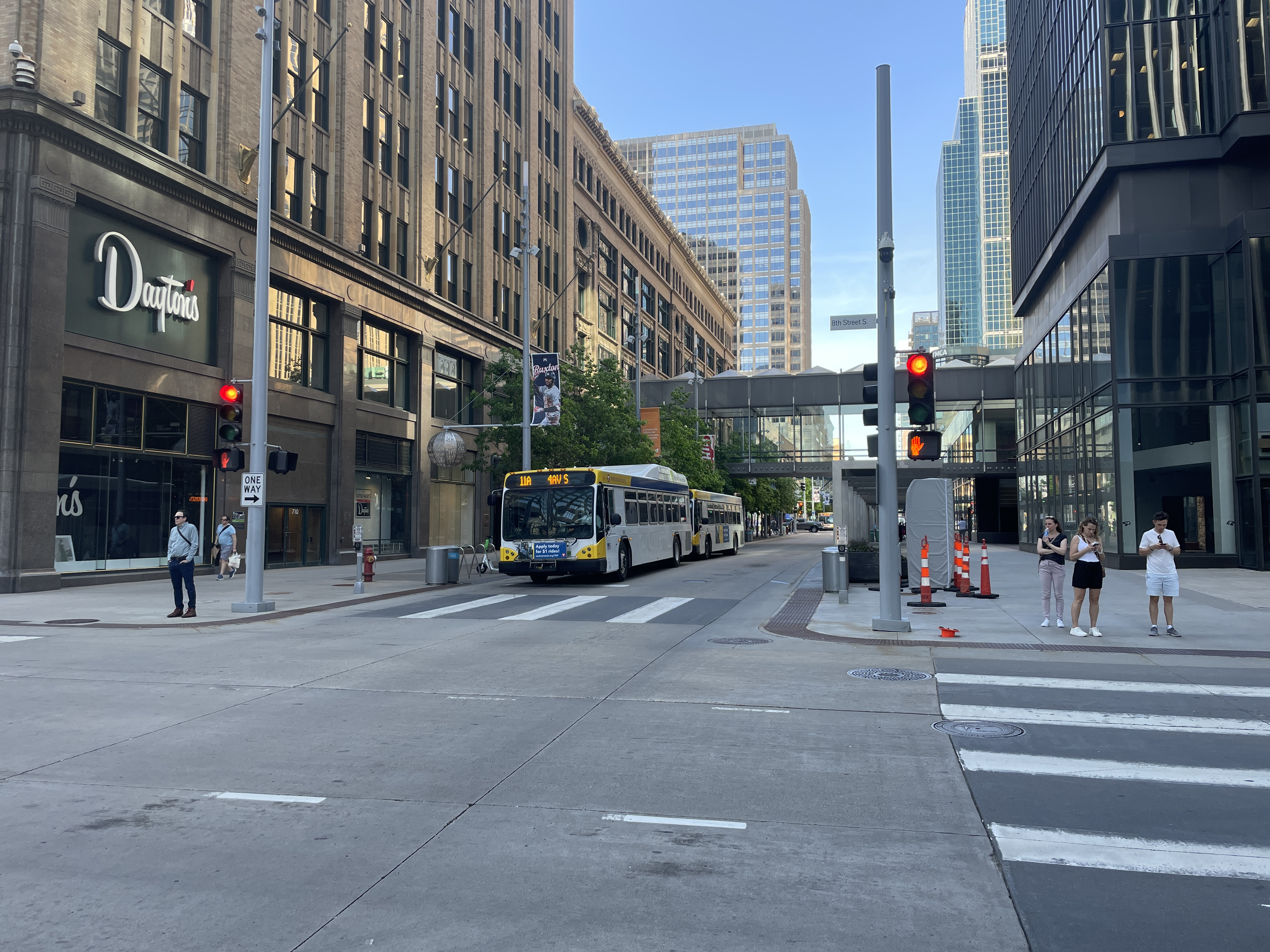
- Nicollet Mall at 8th Street, 2024
- Interactive map of Nicollet Mall
- Former name: Nicollet Avenue (pre-1967)
- Part of: Nicollet Avenue
- Namesake: Joseph Nicollet
- Type: Transit mall/Pedestrian mall
- Owner: City of Minneapolis
- Length: 1 mi (1.6 km)
- Width: 80 ft (24 m)
- Area: Downtown Minneapolis
- Nearest metro station: Metro: Nicollet Mall; 7th-8th Street & Nicollet
- Coordinates: 44°58′36″N 93°16′21″W
- Northeast end: South Washington Avenue
- Southwest end: Grant Street

Other
- Designer: Lawrence Halprin and Associates (1967); BRW Architects (1991); James Corner Field Operations (2017)
- Known for: First transit mall in the United States

Nicollet Mall (/ˈnɪkəlɛt/ NIH-kə-let) is a twelve-block portion of Nicollet Avenue running through Downtown Minneapolis, Minnesota, United States. It is a shopping and dining district of the city, and also a pedestrian mall and transit mall. Along with Hennepin Avenue to the west, Nicollet Mall forms the cultural and commercial center of Minneapolis.

Several notable Minneapolis buildings line the Mall, including the IDS Center, the former Dayton's flagship store, Orchestra Hall, the Minneapolis Central Library, and Westminster Presbyterian Church. The studios and offices of CBS-TV affiliate WCCO are on the southern part of the Mall. Several major companies have their headquarters along the Mall, including Target Corporation and US Bank.

== History ==
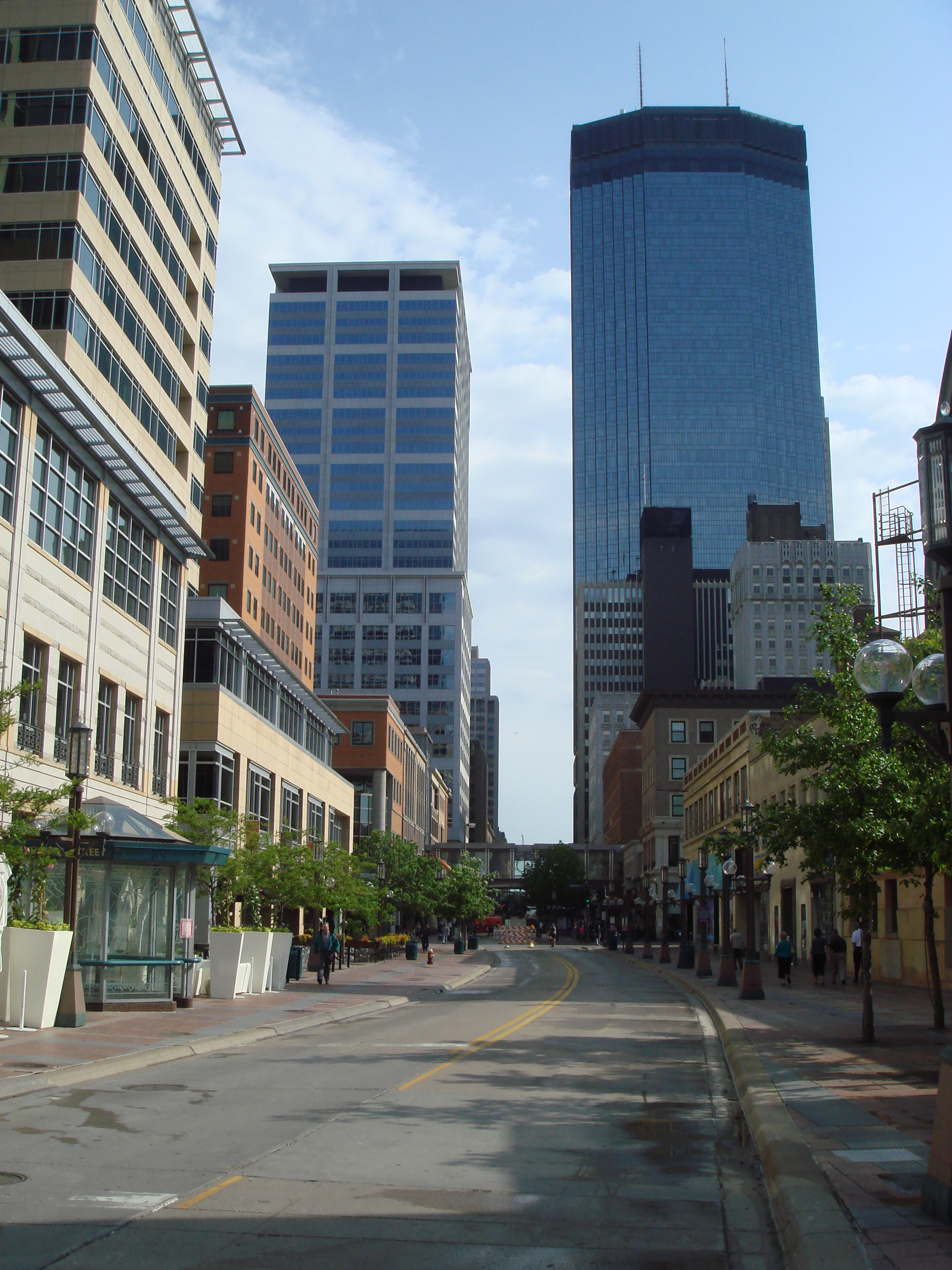
Nicollet Mall (as it looked prior to the renovation in 2016–2017) on a Saturday morning

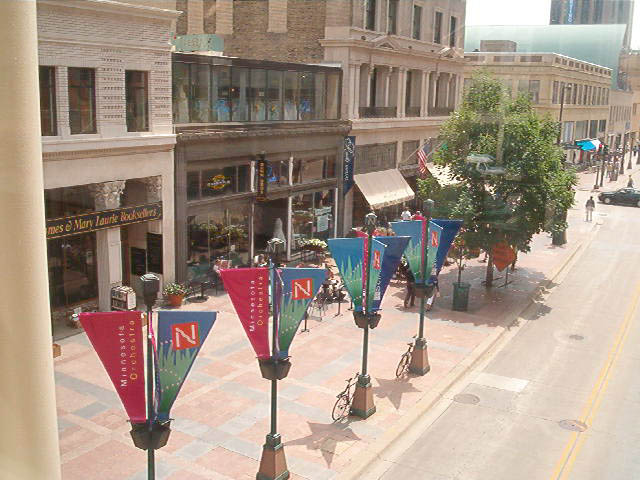
View of Nicollet Mall (as it looked from 1991 to 2016) from a skyway

By the beginning of the 20th century, Nicollet Avenue had defined itself as the city's primary shopping street, as department stores such as G.W. Hale Dry Goods Co. (opening 1867), Donaldson's (1881), and Dayton's (1902) all opened on this stretch. Elizabeth Quinlan, the first woman clothing buyer in the country, opened her store in the Young–Quinlan Building, also on Nicollet.

The first commercial district in Minneapolis centered on the intersection of Nicollet and Hennepin Avenues, an area known as Bridge Square and later the Gateway District. As the city grew and the area became more congested, businesses started moving south from Washington Avenue. When Bridge Square arose in 1906, residents bought hay, dry goods, and supplies at the city market and small stores on Hennepin and Nicollet. Gateway Park replaced the Square in 1913, a green center with a classical pavilion, but was later razed in 1953. Until demolition began in 1959, most of Gateway District remained: a notorious skid row, two parks, large commercial buildings, and hundreds of businesses. The district was seen as suffering from social problems due to the number of flophouses, pawnshops, burlesque theaters, and bars in addition to a high crime rate.

With hopes to solve these problems, city officials began ordering improvements on the area in the 1950s, culminating in the Gateway Center Urban Renewal project, which was approved in 1958 by unanimous City Council vote. Demolition began in 1959. Simultaneously, American shopping habits had begun changing in the mid-20th century, resulting in shopping centers moving to the suburbs. Southdale Center, the nation's first modern enclosed shopping mall, opened in neighboring Edina in 1956. In response, several efforts were undertaken in order to help downtown compete for retail. One was the construction of the renowned skyway system; the second was the creation of Nicollet Mall.

In 1962 the Downtown Council adopted a plan for the mall that was approved by the Minneapolis City Council. The project began construction in 1967 and complete in November 1967 at a cost of $3.875 million. The mall was originally an eight block, 3,200 feet, stretch of Nicollet Avenue that was converted into a curving, tree-lined mall closed to automobile traffic, with an 80-foot right-of-way. The mall was later renovated in 1990 with parts of the underground portion being rebuilt at a cost of $22 million. The original mall had a curvilinear "S" curve alignment with a road width of 24 feet, while the renovated mall has a "C" curve alignment. The 1967 design was done by Lawrence Halprin Associates, while the 1990 redesign was done by BRW, Inc.

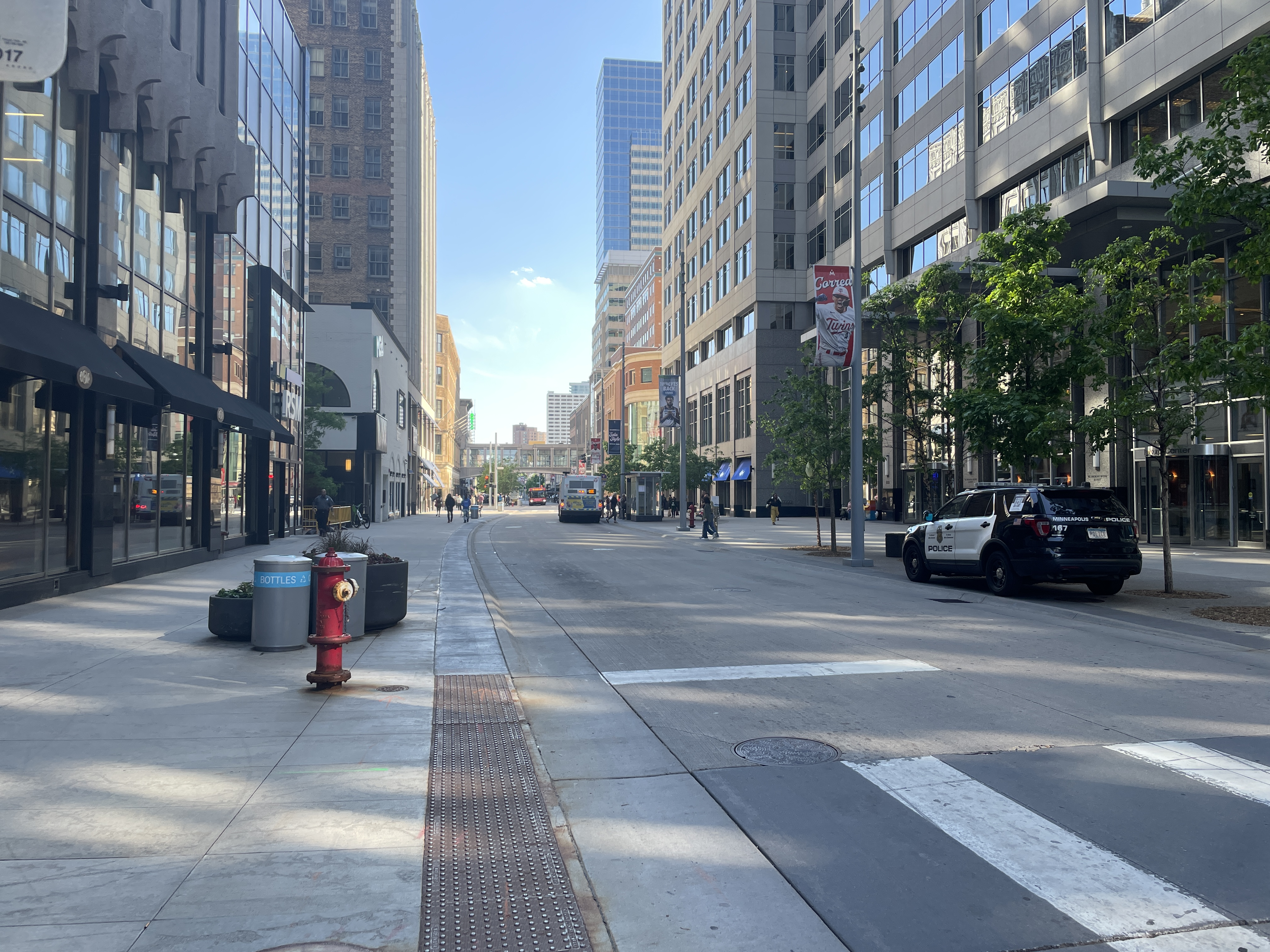
Nicollet Mall after the reconstruction which was completed in 2017

The summer of 2015 started a two-year, $50-million renovation of the mall. The improvements added additional green space, pedestrian amenities and connectivity to surroundings. The redesign was led by James Corner Field Operations who also helped design the High Line in New York City. The mall reopened in November 2017.

=== Holidazzle Parades ===
The Holidazzle Parades were a series of evening parades on Nicollet Mall in downtown Minneapolis. The parades were held from the day after Thanksgiving until a couple days before Christmas. The event started in the early 1990s to increase business for downtown stores.

Macy's, sponsor of the Macy's Thanksgiving Day Parade in New York City and the Celebrate the Season Parade in Pittsburgh, was a sponsor, as was Minneapolis–based Target.

In 2013, organizers announced the parades would be discontinued in favor of a new German-style Christmas market called "Holidazzle Village". Located on Nicollet Mall at Peavey Plaza during its first two years, the village features live music, fireworks and local and international vendors. It moved in 2015 to Loring Park and runs during a period between Thanksgiving and Christmas.

A fictionalized version of the parade appeared in the 1996 Arnold Schwarzenegger film Jingle All The Way. The parade event in the movie was called the "Wintertainment Parade," was shown occurring during the day instead of at night, and was not shot in Minneapolis, although much of the film was shot locally.

== Transportation ==
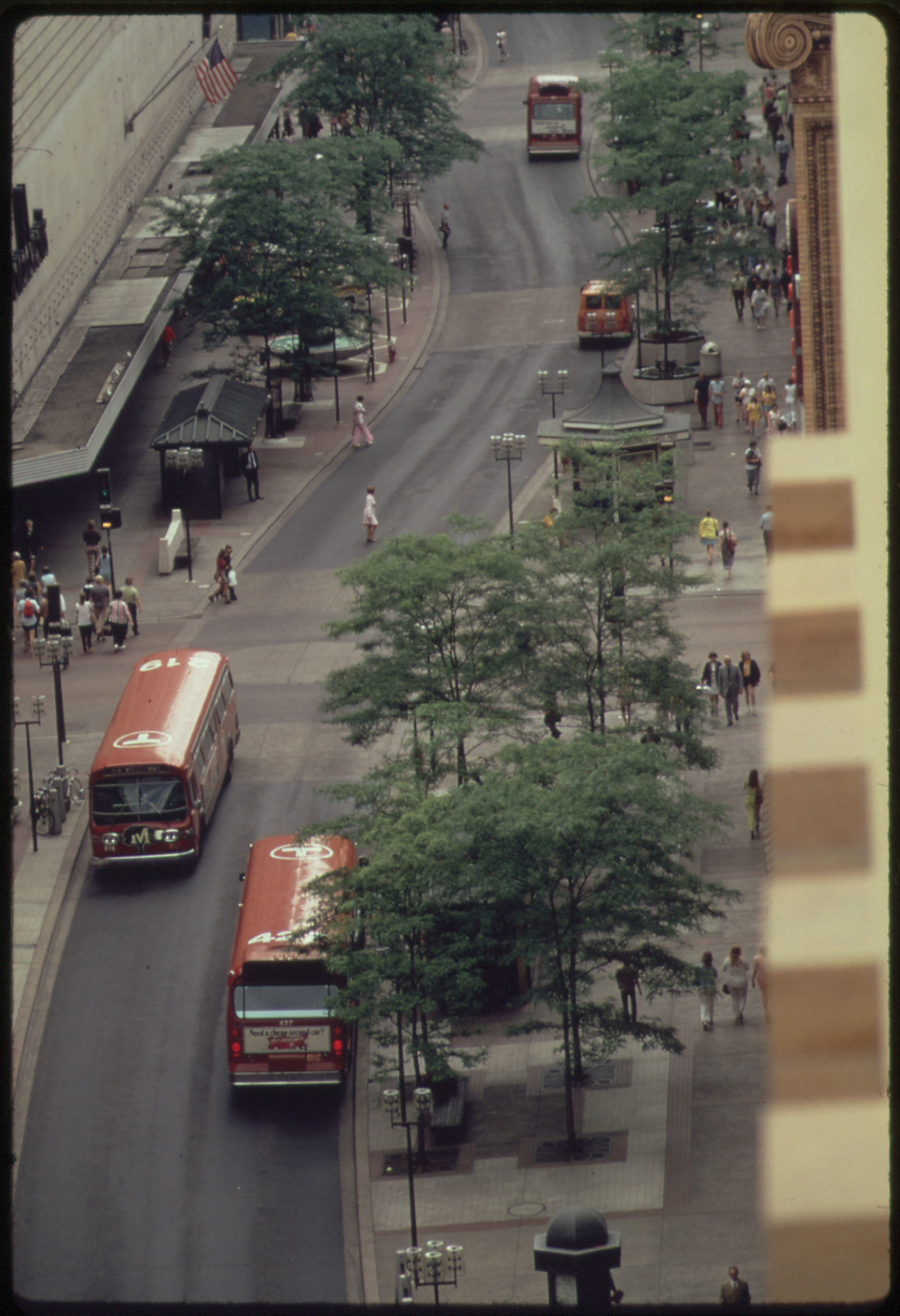
Buses traveling on Nicollet Mall in 1973

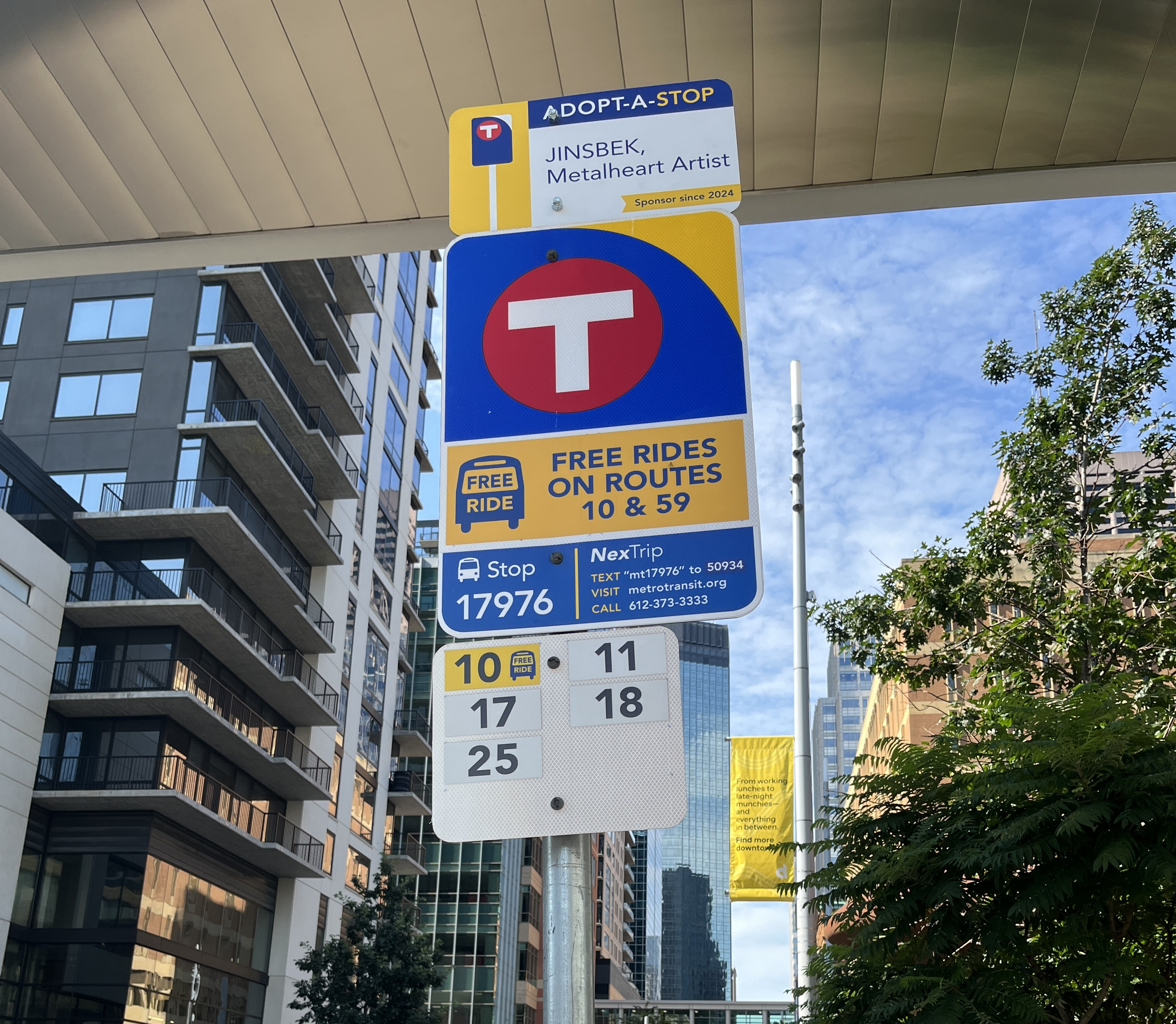
A southbound bus stop sign on Nicollet Mall indicating free rides on routes 10 and 59. Route 59 was suspended in March 2020.

Nicollet Mall is known as the first transit mall and pedestrian mall in the United States, and it inspired the creation of such corridors in other cities, including Portland, Oregon and Denver, Colorado. Civic and business leaders, including the Dayton Company and downtown Minneapolis business owners, were instrumental in this transition.

As a transit mall and pedestrian mall, Nicollet Mall is served by many Metro Transit buses, including several high frequency routes. Aside from buses and Metro Mobility vehicles, only bicycles, pedi-cabs and emergency vehicles are allowed on the two-lane street. With 635 trips on Routes 10, 11, 17, 18, and 25 using Nicollet Mall every weekday in 2023, the street is the busiest transit corridor in Minnesota. Almost 11,000 riders get on or off buses within the corridor. Vehicle speeds on the mall are limited to 10 miles per hour.

Light rail service connects at Nicollet Mall station at 5th Street, providing access to the Metro Blue Line and Green Line. The Blue Line, opened June 2004, connects to the airport and Mall of America in Bloomington. The Green Line, opened June 2014, connects to the University of Minnesota and downtown Saint Paul. Bus rapid transit service connects at 7th-8th Street & Nicollet station, providing access to both the Metro C Line and Metro D Line. The C Line, opened June 2019, connects to Brooklyn Center. The D Line, opened December 2022, connects Brooklyn Center and the Mall of America. Local Routes 10 and 18 provide a free trips along Nicollet Mall from the Minneapolis Convention Center to the Washington Avenue.

Starting in June 2023, the city of Minneapolis began exploring removing buses from Nicollet Mall and only allowing pedestrians and bicycles. The street would function as more of a public plaza with regular event programming.

The Loring Greenway links the south end of the Mall to nearby Loring Park.

== Businesses and landmarks ==
The Dayton's department store between 7th and 8th Streets was rebranded Marshall Field's in 2001, and then Macy's in 2006. It closed in 2017 and was renovated as an indoor shopping mall and office space. Renamed The Dayton's Project, the shopping center opened in 2021 with an open concept retail space on the first and second floor. In late 2019, the original Dayton's signage, removed in 2001, was restored. The corporate descendant of Dayton's, Target Corporation, has a large presence on the Mall, with both its corporate headquarters at 10th Street and a two-level retail store at 9th Street.

National retailers and local boutiques cluster around several locations, namely the Crystal Court, Minneapolis City Center and Gaviidae Common located on the Mall, although most of these areas have seen business departures since 2020. Saks Fifth Avenue's Nicollet Mall location was the company's only store in the Twin Cities upon its closing in 2004. Discount store Saks Off 5th remained on Nicollet Mall until 2020; it was one of the largest Saks Off 5th stores in the United States. City Center has a handful of shops like GNC. Brooks Brothers reopened on the second floor of City Center after closing its store in Bloomington at the Mall of America, and then closed in 2020. Gaviidae Center is home to the Downtown Minneapolis YMCA. Other shops are either local boutiques, specialty stores, or fast food eateries that operate almost exclusively during the weekday lunch hour. The Hyatt Regency and the Millennium Minneapolis hotels anchor the southern end of Nicollet Mall. Prominent hotels adjacent to the mall include the Westin, The Four Seasons, and the Marquette.

Over the years, Nicollet Mall has seen the closing of several national clothing brands, including Polo Ralph Lauren and Cole Haan, which was its only store in the Twin Cities. Cole Haan relocated to the Galleria in Edina. Additional closures included Gap, Banana Republic, Men's Wearhouse, Nordstrom Rack, and Marshalls. The Macy's downtown location was the division headquarters of Macy's North from 2006 to 2008 before it was integrated into Macy's East headquartered in New York City. Since 2000, the century-old local menswear store Hubert White has operated in the IDS Center, selling upscale men's clothing, mainly by Ermenegildo Zegna.

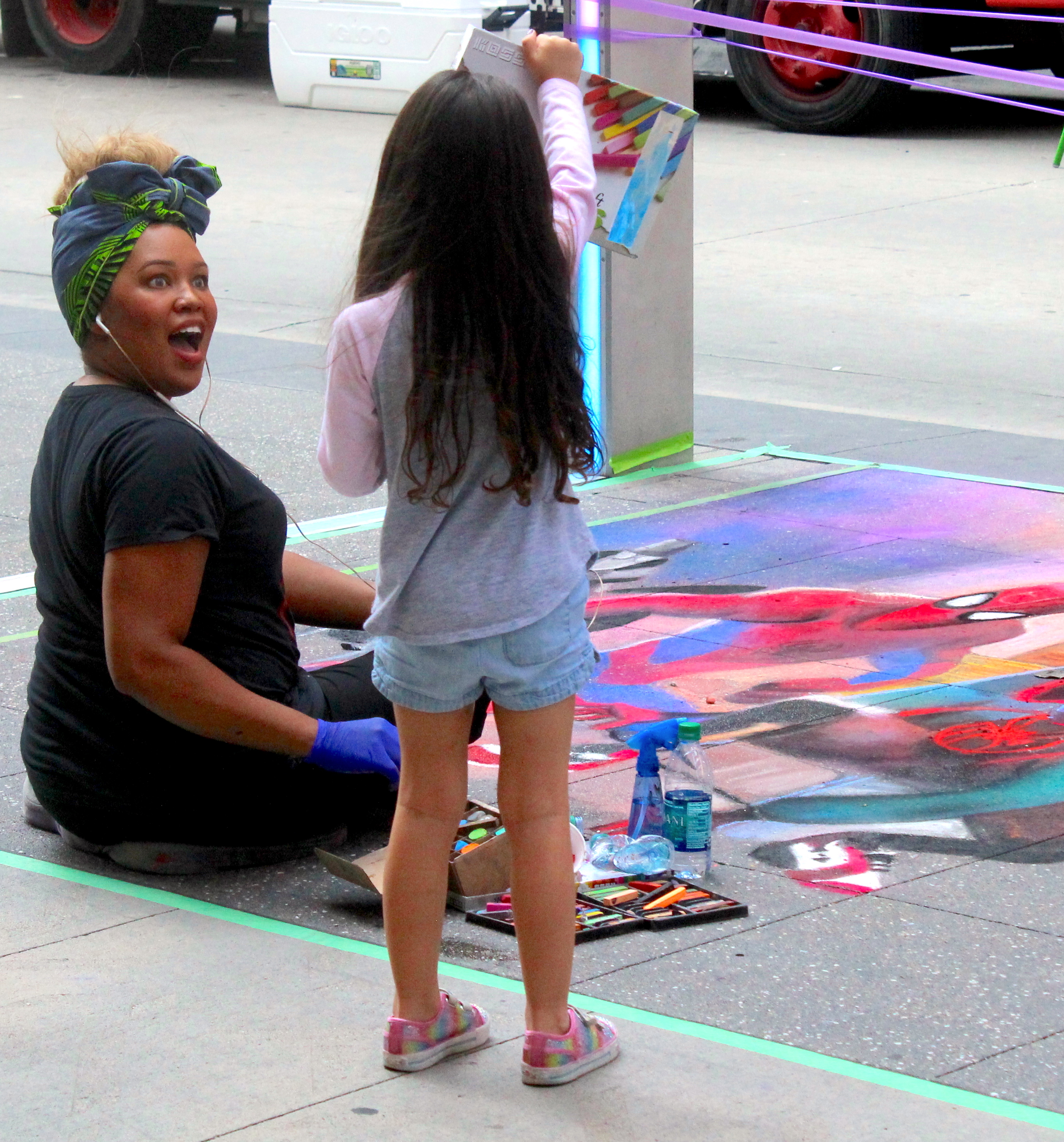
Young fan shares her artwork with artist Amanda Harris at the 2019 Minneapolis Street Art Festival

In addition to Target Corporation, Fortune 500 companies U.S. Bancorp and Xcel Energy have their headquarters on Nicollet, while WCCO-TV (CBS Channel 4) is located on the southern part of the Mall. A block south of the TV station is one of the oldest buildings on the mall, Westminster Presbyterian Church. The church has been located at three locations on Nicollet since 1860.

While Nicollet Mall is no longer the retail destination it once was, future revitalization plans continue to spark discussion amongst local lawmakers and business interest groups.

== In popular culture ==
The mall is featured in The Mighty Ducks when the team goes rollerblading.

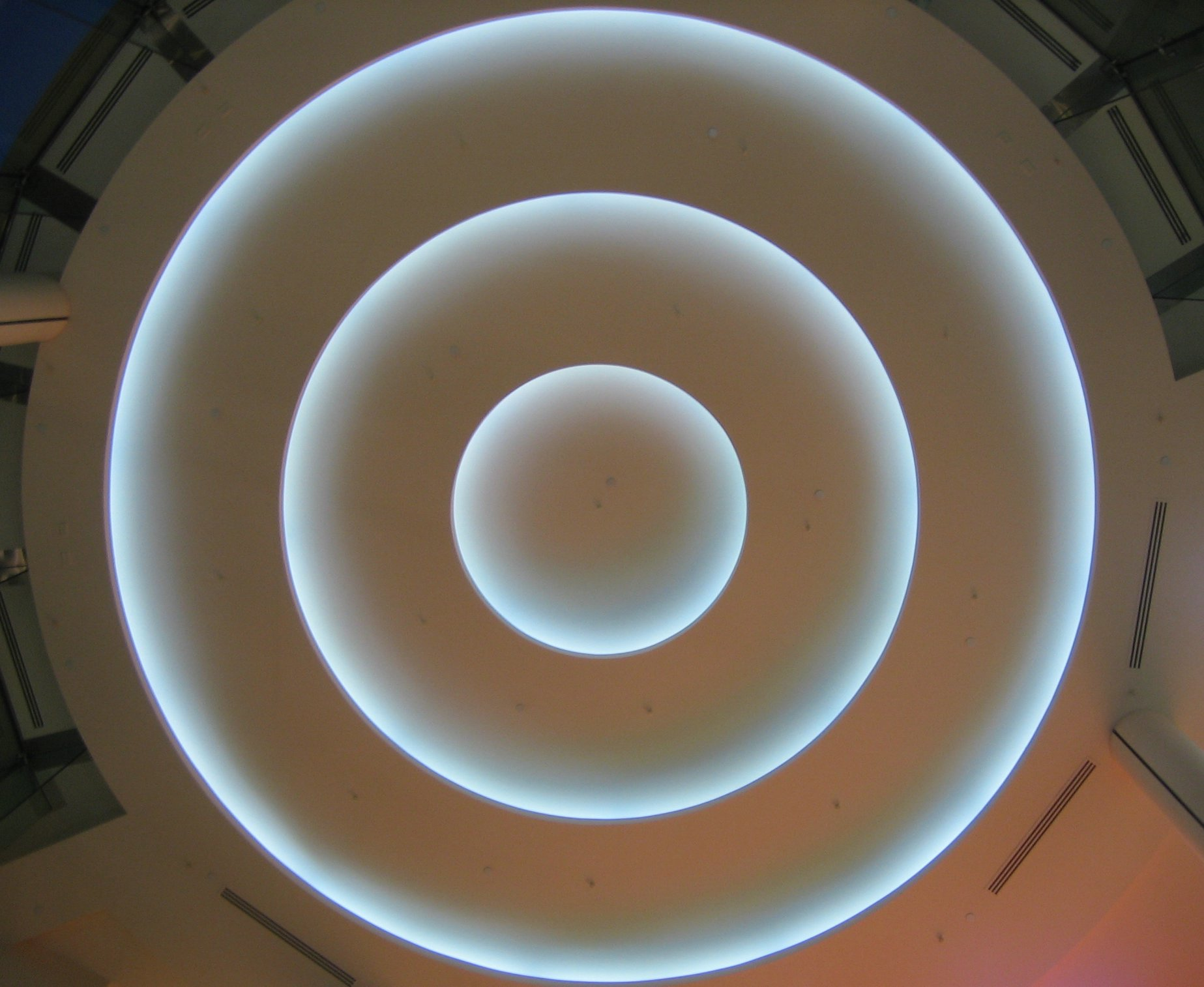
Target store ceiling in Nicollet Mall store

The tam o'shanter cap toss by television character Mary Richards (Mary Tyler Moore) in the opening credits of The Mary Tyler Moore Show was filmed on Nicollet Mall, in front of what was then the flagship Donaldson's department store. In 1999, Entertainment Weekly named this scene the second greatest moment of television history. The Mall was also the setting of numerous location shots during the run of The Mary Tyler Moore Show.

In May 2002, a bronze sculpture of Moore's character, created by Gwen Gillen and commissioned by TV Land, was dedicated at the corner of 7th Street and Nicollet Mall. Gillen's design was chosen from a group of 21 sculptors who submitted applications for the sculpture.

== See also ==
- List of shopping streets and districts by city
