= M. Paul Friedberg =

American landscape architect (1931–2025)

- Born: Marvin Paul Friedberg; October 11, 1931; Brooklyn, New York, U.S.
- Died: February 15, 2025 (aged 93); New York City, U.S.
- Education: Cornell University
- Occupation: Landscape architect
- Spouses: Esther Louise Hidary (m. 1962; died 1982): Dorit Shahar
- Children: 3
- Awards: ASLA Design Medal (2004); ASLA Medal (2015)
- Practice: M. Paul Friedberg and Partners

Marvin Paul Friedberg, FASLA (October 11, 1931 – February 15, 2025) was an American landscape architect known for his work on playful public spaces.

== Life and career ==
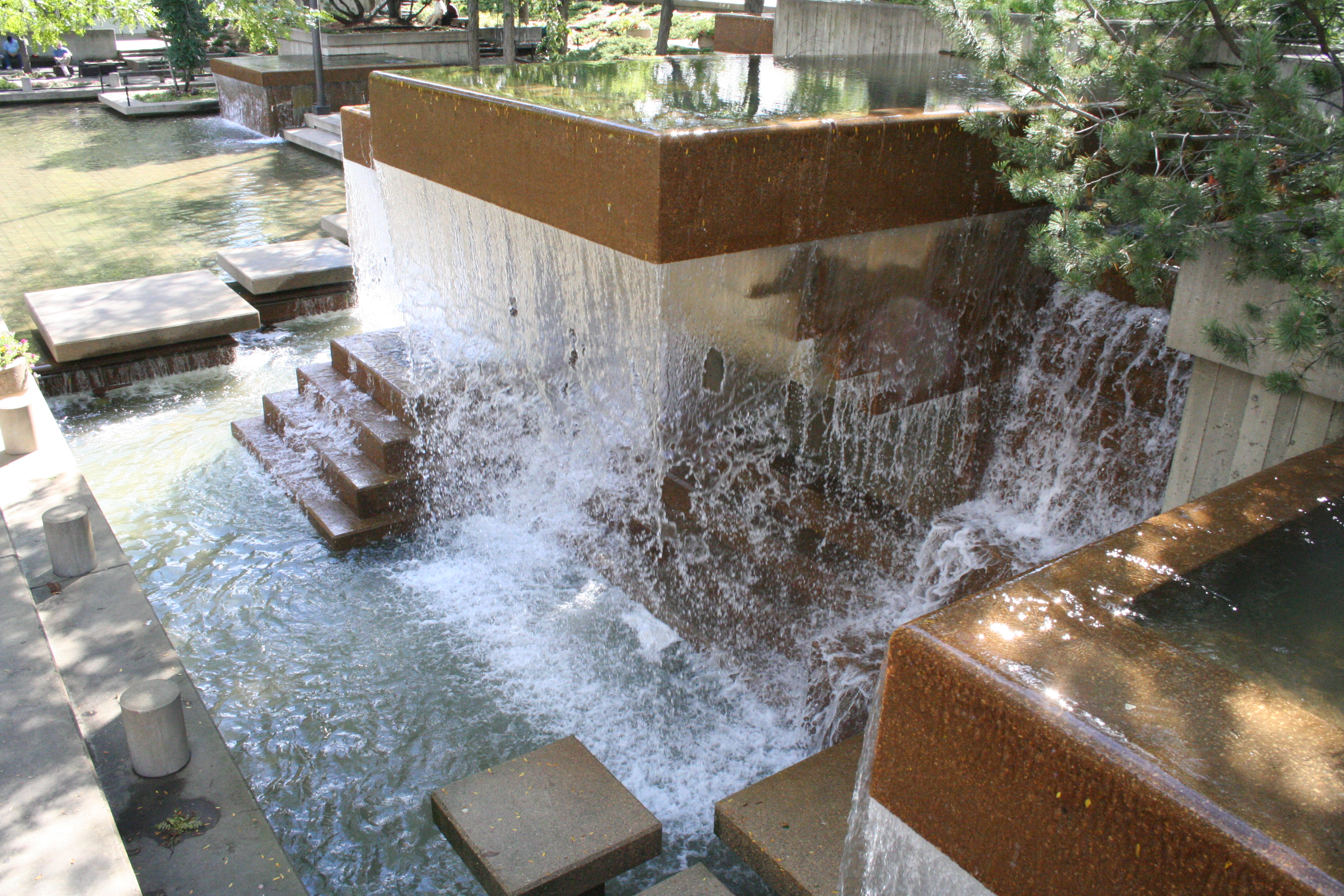
Peavey Plaza, Minneapolis

M. Paul Friedberg was born in Brooklyn, New York, on October 11, 1931, the only son of Mary (Bennett) Friedberg and Morris Friedberg, a milk inspector. During his childhood, his family moved to Winfield, Pennsylvania, where he went to elementary school in a one-room schoolhouse, and then to Middletown, New York, where he attended Middletown High School. In 1954 he graduated from Cornell University with a Bachelor of Science degree in horticulture. He said that "after navigating four socially active years the reality of growing up set in." He said that his largest influence for pursuing landscape architecture was the chance to connect people to themselves, to each other and to their environment.

In 1958, four years after graduating, Friedberg opened his landscape practice, M. Paul Friedberg and Partners. The contributions the firm has made to the aesthetic environment of urban life have been revolutionary in design and intent. Here, he soon became a leading Landscape Architect of new public spaces. All of which included plazas, main strip malls, and small vest-pocket parks. Paul Friedberg also established the first undergraduate landscape architecture program in a major city at the City College of New York, focusing on the social and physical issues inherent to an urban environment.

In 1965, Friedberg designed an innovative play area at Jacob Riis Plaza that would later be demolished in 2000. This innovative play area was created to allow children of different ages to utilize the many different structures including a series of pyramids, mounds, and a tunnel in many ways.

Friedberg continued his design work until late in life, commenting it is "not a bad way to spend [my] day" and summarizing his philosophy, upon reception of his 2015 ASLA medal, as follows:

Design is a personal journey. The fact that I have the power to alter the appearance and content of a site merely by placing ideas on a piece of paper or a screen, is an ongoing adventure-and exploration into the unknown about how space and form can direct human response. It is about the discovery of myself, my aesthetic preference and social values at a given point in time. I create three-dimensionally what the writer accomplishes with words. It is not without anxiety, as the ideas haven't a reality until cast in a space and experienced.

He was married to the landscape architect Dorit Shahar, and they had a daughter, Maya. He previously had two sons, Mark and Jeffrey, with his first wife, Esther Hidary, who were married to each other for two decades until she died in 1982. Friedberg died of complications from COVID-19 at a hospital in New York City on February 15, 2025, at the age of 93.

== Jacob Riis Plaza ==
One of Friedberg's most notable projects was the Jacob Riis Plaza, undertaken in the mid-1960s. The Jacob Riis Complex is a series of 14-story buildings along the Lower East Side of Manhattan. The large open spaces between the blocks were poorly laid out, with little consideration of the residents' needs. Friedberg's redesign separated the space into human scaled areas using pergolas, terraces and mounds. Materials and features were selected for their robustness, for example large timbers, and vandal resistant lighting.

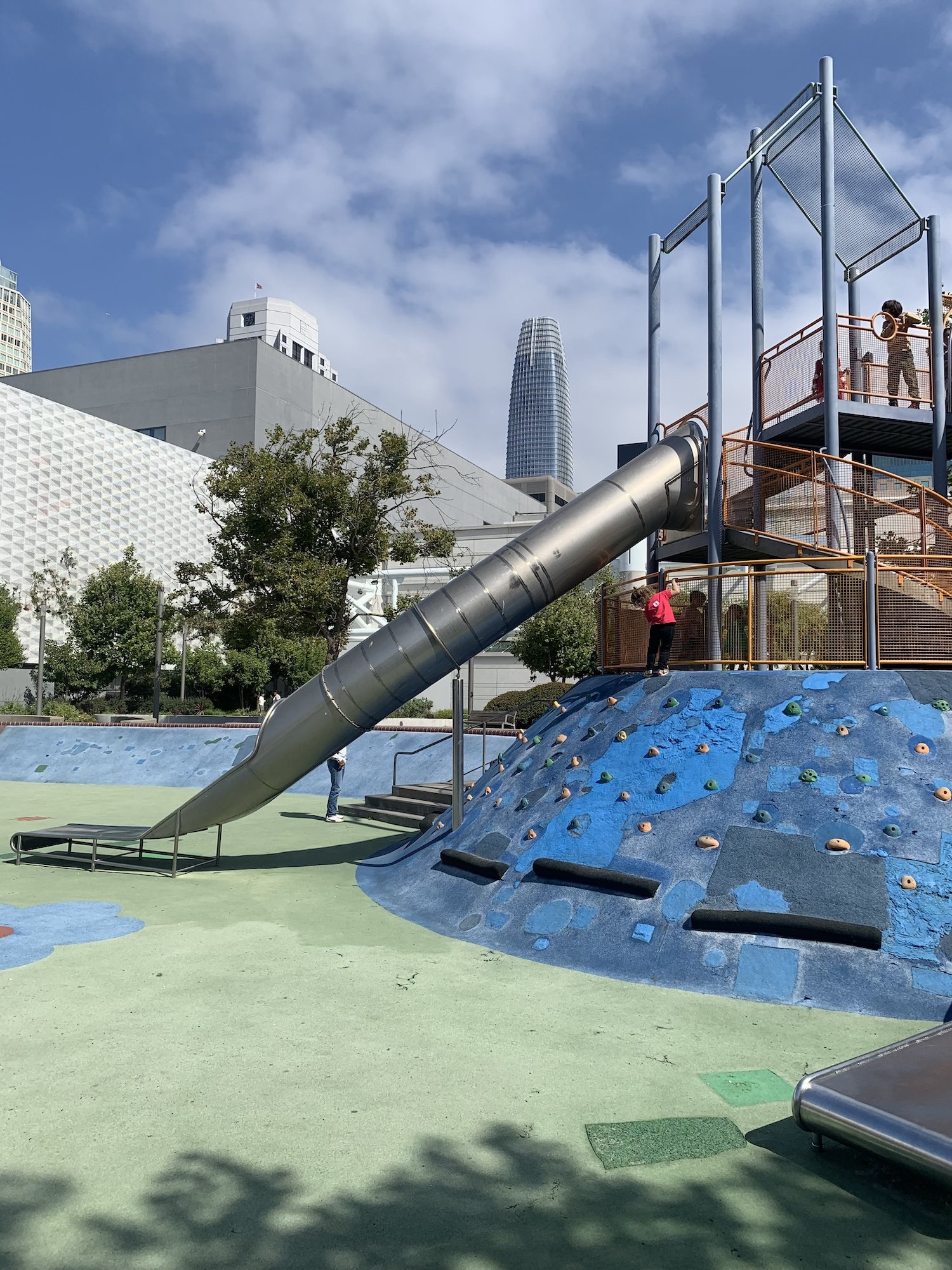
Yerba Buena, San Francisco

== Other major projects ==
- Peavey Plaza, Minneapolis, Minnesota
- Olympic Plaza, Calgary, Alberta
- Madison Mall, Madison, Wisconsin
- Pershing Park, Washington, D.C.
- Loring Greenway, Minneapolis, Minnesota
- Fort Worth Cultural District, Fort Worth, Texas
- Master plan for a proposed new state capital city in Willow, Alaska
- Colony Square Site Plan, Atlanta, Georgia
- Yerba Buena Gardens Playground, San Francisco, California

== Published works ==
- Play and Interplay: A Manifesto for New Design in Urban Recreational Environment, with Ellen Perry Berkeley, 1970
- Handcrafted playgrounds: Designs you can build yourself, 1975
- Do-It-Yourself Playgrounds, 1976
