= The Cultural Landscape Foundation =

U.S. non-profit organization

- Formation: 1998
- Founder: Charles A. Birnbaum
- Purpose: Connecting people to places
- Headquarters: Washington, D.C.
- Region served: United States
- President: Charles A. Birnbaum
- Website: www.tclf.org

The Cultural Landscape Foundation (TCLF) is a 501(c)(3) non-profit founded in 1998 by Charles A. Birnbaum with a mission of "connecting people to places."

== Mission ==
The mission of the TCLF is to educate and engage the public to study landscapes and better understand the individuals who created them. Its website provides a search portal to a database of many pioneers of American landscape design and their built works. As an advocate for threatened landscapes, the organization has also stopped the destruction of over 50 gardens and parks through its annual Landslides list. The TCLF's goal is achieved through outreach and education including tours and photo exhibits.

== History ==
Charles Birnbaum began his career with 15 years as the coordinator of the National Park Service's Historic Landscaping Initiative (HLI) and then 10 years focusing on landscape preservation and urban design through a private practice Birnbaum started The Cultural Landscape and Design Foundation (TCLF) while he was working at the National Park Service and later in 2008 became the president and CEO of the TCLF.

Over the course of its life the TCLF has created several publications and awards available to those involved in landscape design. Publications include "What’s Out There", "Pioneers of American Landscape Design", and "Landslide". Their main award is the biennial "The Cornelia Hahn Oberlander International Landscape Architecture Prize". Awards also include the "Stewardship Excellence Award" and fellowships like the "Sally Boasberg Founder’s Fellowship", and "Danette Gentile Kauffman Cultural Landscape Fellowship".

"What’s Out There" is an online database that can be searched by content, landscape, style, and region. Entries can be identified as "At-Risk", "Saved", or "Lost" based on the current state of the area. This database then led to the creation of the "What’s Out There Cultural Landscapes Guides". These guides were created in partnership with the National Park Services’ Northeast Regional Office in 2016 to celebrate its 100th anniversary. In 2019 these guides were given an honorary award by the American Society of Landscape Architects (ASLA) in the Communications category.

TCLF launched the Cornelia Hahn Oberlander International Landscape Architecture Prize in 2021, which includes a $100,000 award and two years of public engagement activities. Its first recipient was Julie Bargmann.
