= Peavey Plaza =

- U.S. National Register of Historic Places
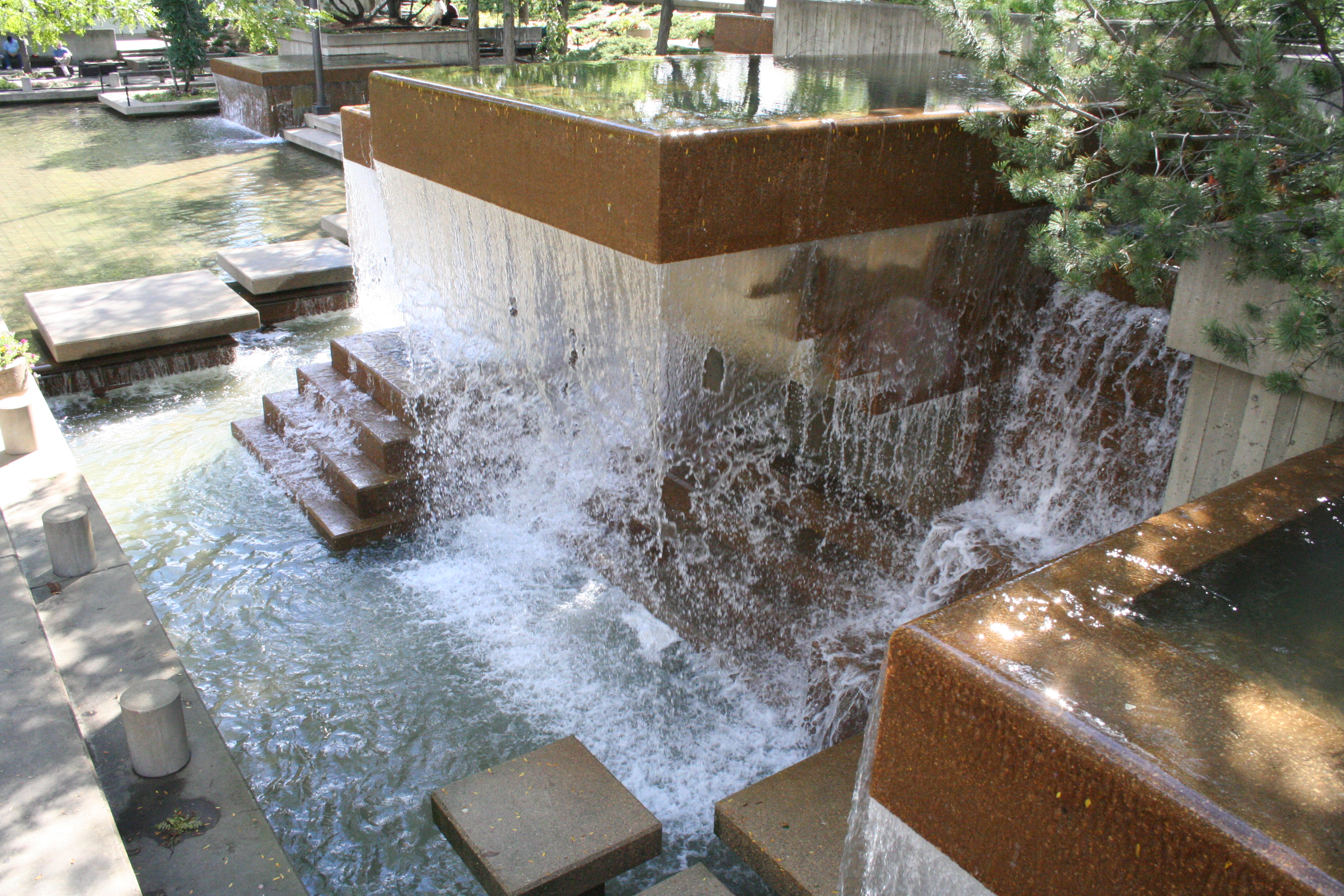
- Fountain at Peavey Plaza

- Location within Minnesota Location within the United States
- Location: 1101 Nicollet Mall
- Coordinates: 44°58′19.9″N 93°16′31.9″W
- Area: 1 acre (0.40 ha)
- Built: 1975
- Architect: M. Paul Friedberg
- Architectural style: Modern Movement
- NRHP reference No.: 12001173
- Added to NRHP: January 14, 2013

Peavey Plaza is a park plaza that serves as a public outdoor space in downtown Minneapolis, Minnesota at the south end of Nicollet Mall between South 11th and 12th Streets. The sunken plaza and its amphitheater were designed by landscape architect M. Paul Friedberg and built in 1975 alongside Orchestra Hall. The Cultural Landscape Foundation has deemed the plaza a "marvel of modernism" and it was named one of the top ten most endangered historical sites in Minnesota before its rehabilitation in 2019.

== Revitalization ==
In 2011, joint plans by the City of Minneapolis and Minnesota Orchestra management were criticized for excluding key designers such as Friedberg. Following a public meeting where architect Tom Oslund proposed changing the plaza, Minneapolis activist Trish Brock launched the Save Peavey Plaza campaign. Brock reached out to and united The Cultural Landscape Foundation and the Preservation Alliance to move forward with the preservation of Peavey Plaza.

In June 2012, the Preservation Alliance of Minnesota and The Cultural Landscape Foundation filed a lawsuit against the City of Minneapolis on the grounds that the planned demolition of Peavey Plaza would violate a Minnesota law protecting "historic resources" from "pollution, impairment or destruction." In January 2013, the plaza was placed on the National Register of Historic Places; the lawsuit remained outstanding at that time. On October 4, 2013, the lawsuit was resolved in favor of the Plaza's preservation. The settlement agreement included the following language:

The parties agree that the goal of any new plan plan will be to preserve the Plaza through a rehabilitation that is consistent with the Secretary of Interior's Standards for Treatment of Historic Properties, and specifically with the Guidelines for the Treatment of Cultural Landscapes published by the U.S. National Park Service."

The National Trust for Historic Preservation listed the plaza as one of ten historic sites saved in 2013. The coalition that advocated to save the plaza won an Advocacy Award of Excellence from Docomomo US in 2014.

In November and December 2014, the plaza was used as the site of the "Minneapolis Holiday Market", a part of the Holidazzle Village which replaced the holiday parade held in previous years.

Within the next year the city found the fountains and pool too difficult to maintain and drained them. The plaza remained open with the water features inactive until 2017 when the city and consultants finalized new plans for a redesign.

The $10 million renovation, completed in July 2019 by Coen+Partners with Fluidity Design and Tillett Lighting Design, preserved the original design of the plaza but improved its accessibility and sustainability, and brought new light to the southern end of Nicollet Mall. The rehabilitated Peavey Plaza features new and improved water fountains, a shallower 0.25-inch wading pool that can be easily drained for events, interactive changing lighting, ramps for accessibility, and a new entertainment plaza. In 2022, the plaza's rehabilitation won a Modernism in America Civic Design Award of Excellence from Docomomo US. The non-profit organization Green Minneapolis operates and programs the plaza under contract to the City of Minneapolis.
