= Loring Park =

Urban park in Minneapolis, Minnesota

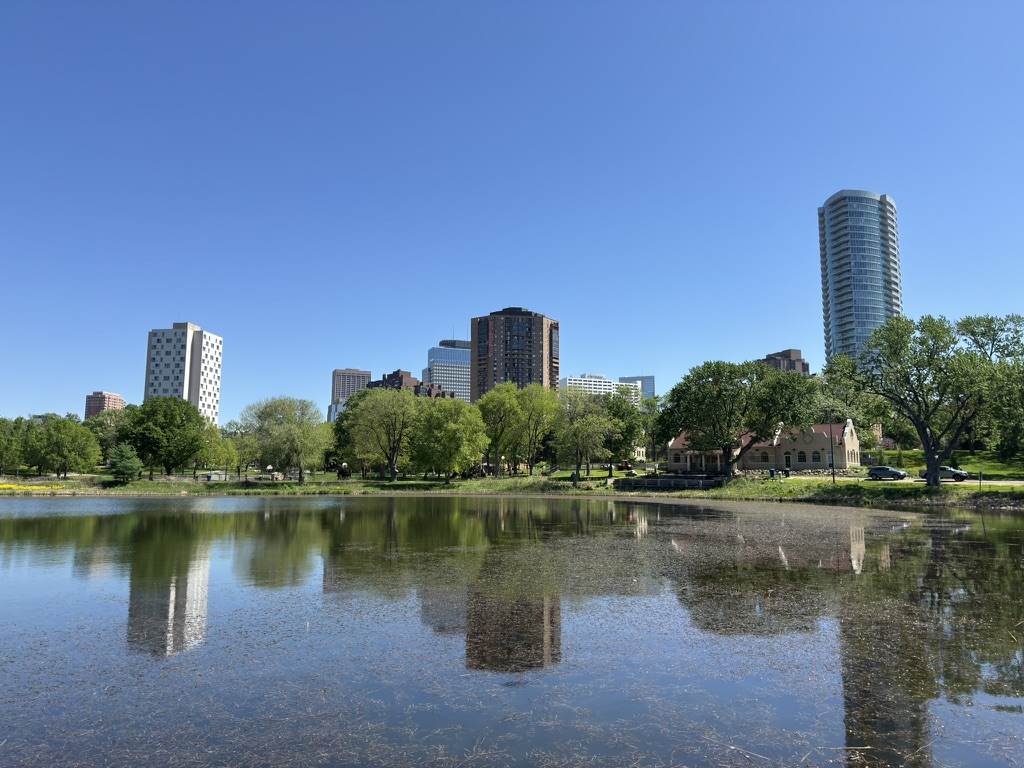
- Loring Lake in 2025.
- Interactive map of Loring Park
- Type: Urban park
- Location: Minneapolis, Minnesota
- Coordinates: 44°58′12″N 93°17′02″W
- Area: 33.94 acres (13.74 ha)
- Status: Open all year

Loring Park is a park in the Loring Park neighborhood of Minneapolis, Minnesota.

== History ==
Loring Park was established in 1883 after the passage of the Park Act, which first created the Minneapolis Park and Recreation Board. The park was first named Central Park. In 1890 the park was renamed again in honor of Charles Morgridge Loring, who was the first president of the park board in Minneapolis.

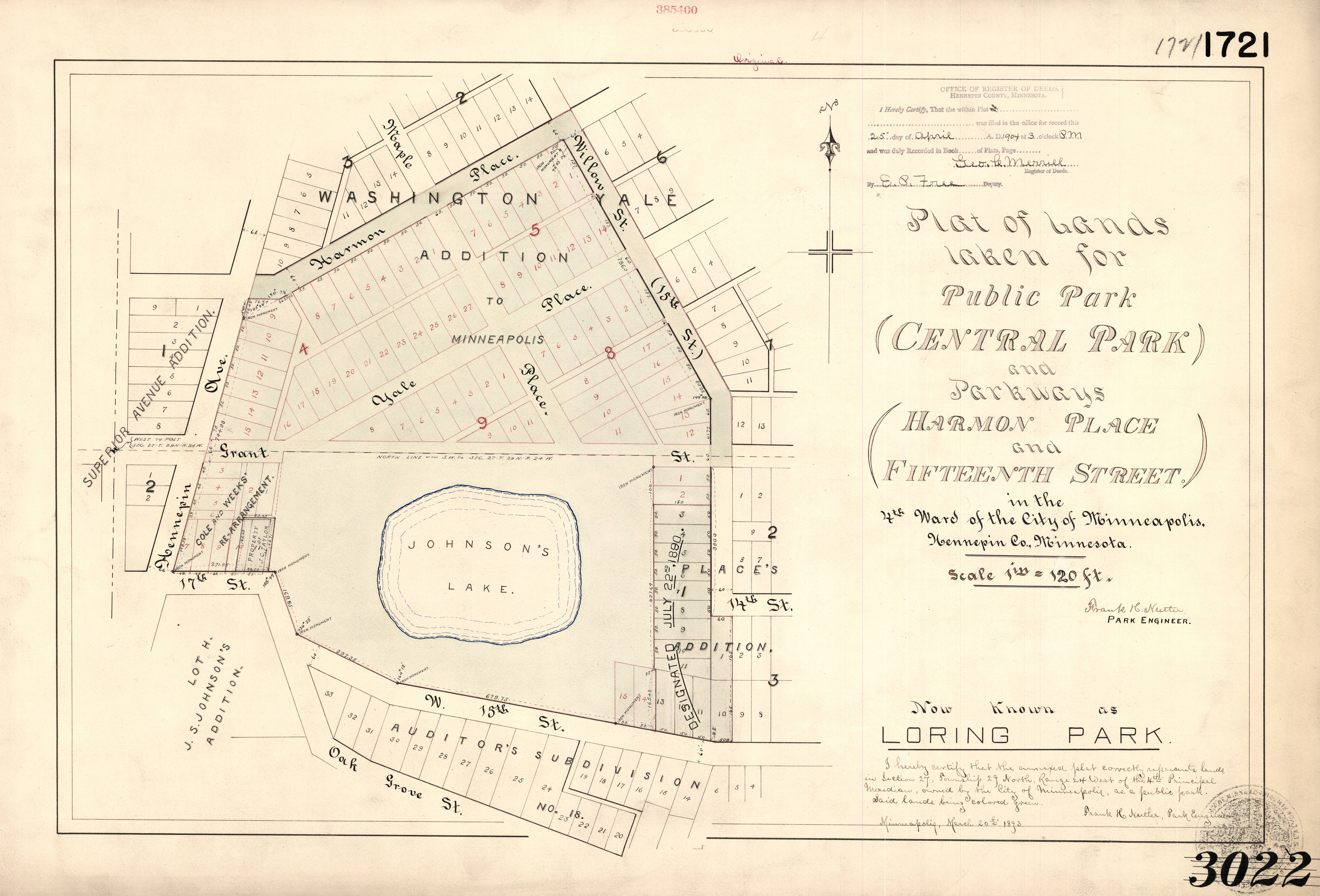
Lands Taken for Public Park (Central Park) and Parkways (Harmon Place and Fifteenth Street). Now Known as Loring Park. - DPLA

Loring Park was purchased by the Minnesota Public Parks board on April 28, 1883. The land was purchased for $150,000 and contained 30 acres of land. A few more pieces of land were added to the park for a total cost of $350,000. This was the first plot of land that was purchased by the Minnesota Public Parks board. Shortly after purchasing the land, the Minneapolis Public Parks board hired George Brakett and Horace Cleveland to design the park and to drain the bog in the lake. They used plants that were brought in from nearby woods to complete the design for the park. They also decided at this time to make the park pedestrian only.

In 1906 the first permanent building in any Minneapolis park was constructed in Loring Park. The heated two-story shelter was donated by Charles Loring and was used as a warming house, recreation center and kindergarten. In 1960, the park renovated the shelter to be used as a space for senior programs. It was the first Minneapolis park to provide senior activities. Loring Park was the first park in Minnesota to have electric lights. The lights were installed in fall of 1884 to be used to illuminate the pond during winter skating season. In 1916 the local General Mills Company provided the park with 91 electric lights.

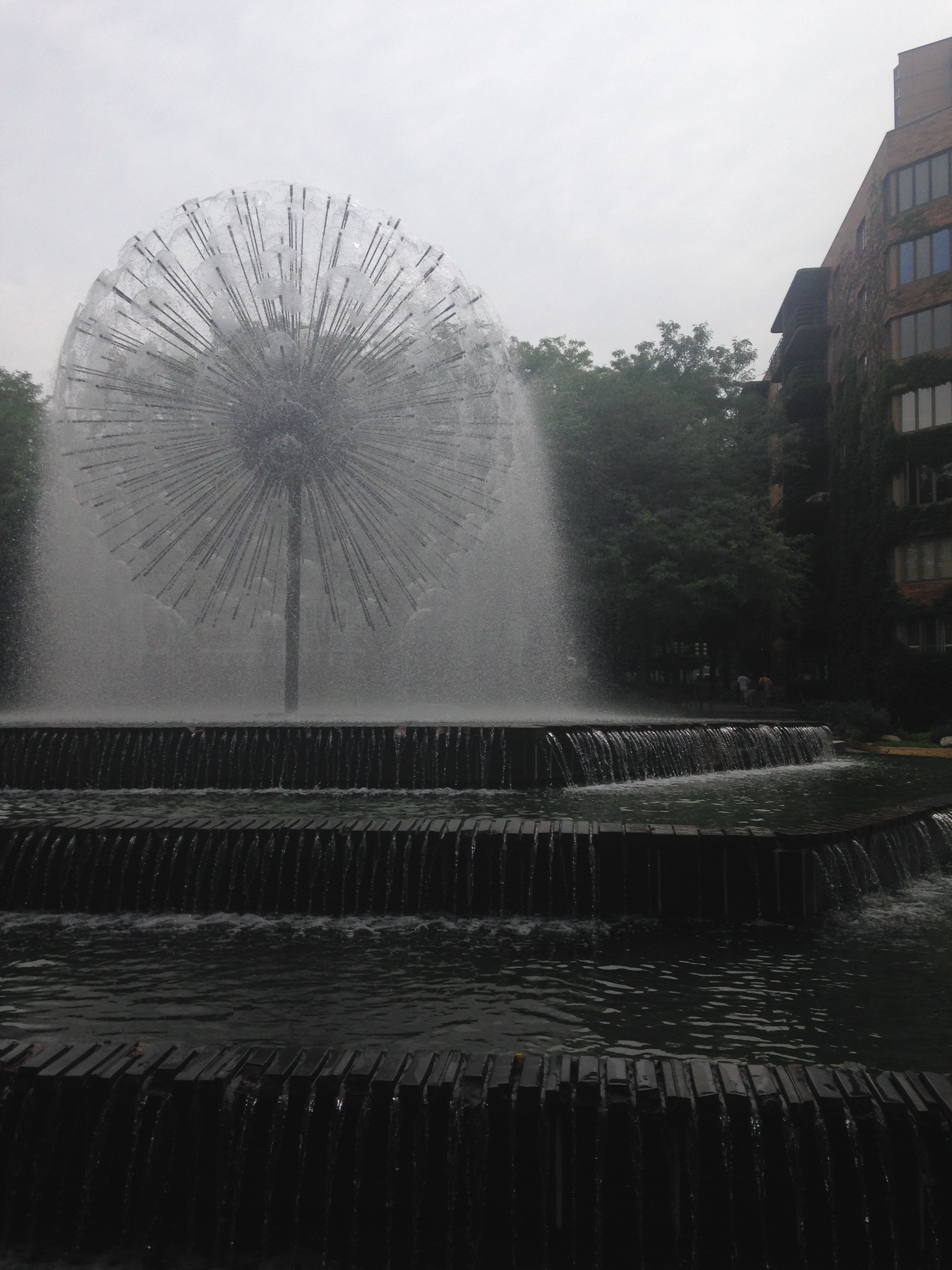
Berger Fountain at Loring Park, Minneapolis, MN.

Loring Park was the center of the case Johnson v. Minneapolis Park and Recreation Board (MPRB). This lawsuit was between the Minneapolis Park and Recreation Board and Brian Johnson over First Amendment rights. The United States Court of Appeals for the Eighth Circuit ruled that MSRB can not ban non-commercial material distribution in the park unless the material violates the law.

== Events ==
Loring Park is the venue for various annual events. The Twin Cities LGBTQ+ Pride Festival, the Loring Park Art Festival and the wintertime Holidazzle are some of the more famous events. Loring Park's location directly across from the Walker Art Museum makes it a fitting venue for the annual Loring Park Art Festival and a series of smaller artist gatherings.

In 2014 and 2015 Chipotle held their Cultivate free music and culinary festival in Loring Park. The 2014 lineup included Portugal. The Man, The Mowgli's, and Grouplove. Walk the Moon, Atlas Genius, X Ambassadors, Anderson East, and Hippo Campus were all slotted to appear at the 2015 festival. Andrew Zimmern and Richard Blais also attended the event, a part of the festival's gratuitous "Chef Demos."

In addition, Loring Park is home to the annual "Winterfest at Loring Park," which in 2016 included horse-drawn carriage rides, holiday crafts and the local Kairos Dance Company. It is hosted by the Minneapolis Parks and Recreation Board.

Beginning in 2016 the Minneapolis Downtown Council moved the annual Holidazzle winter event, which had previously been held downtown on Nicollet Mall, to the park due to the two year construction project along Nicollet Mall. The huge winter event attracts thousands of people and runs weekends from Thanksgiving through Christmas and focuses on local food vendors, a performance stage, fireworks, locally produced holiday gifts, a large beer tent, visits with Santa and many events for children. In addition, a skating rink and large warming house tent is set up which continues through early March as part of the event. Due to the COVID-19 pandemic Holidazzle did not take place in 2020. After returning to Loring Park in 2021 in a hybrid, more limited format and a full schedule in 2022, Holidazzle was put on hold for 2023 due to a lack of funding.

== Park features ==
The park contains a small lake (Loring Lake, formerly known as Johnson's Lake) and paths for walking and biking. Originally named Central Park, it was renamed in honor of Charles M. Loring, known as the "Father of Minneapolis Parks."

The park is the site of various cultural, social and political events. It features a playground, biking and walking paths, public art, and a fishing pier. It displays two well-known pieces of public art: The 1971 "Berger Fountain" (also known as "Dandelion Fountain"), an authorized copy of the renowned El Alamein Fountain in Sydney (built by the original artist Robert Woodward and shipped to Minnesota), was gifted by Parks Commissioner Ben Berger in 1973 and installed in 1974–1975; and a statue of Norwegian composer Ole Bull. The Berger fountain is not currently operational (as of 2023), but a community group is working with the Minneapolis Park and Recreation Board to restore the fountain with an estimated construction date of 2025.

Two pavers on the north side of the Garden of the Seasons (northwest side of Loring Park), honor local HIV/AIDS and LGBTQ+ rights activist David Madson, who was murdered by his former partner and spree killer Andrew Cunanan in May 1997.

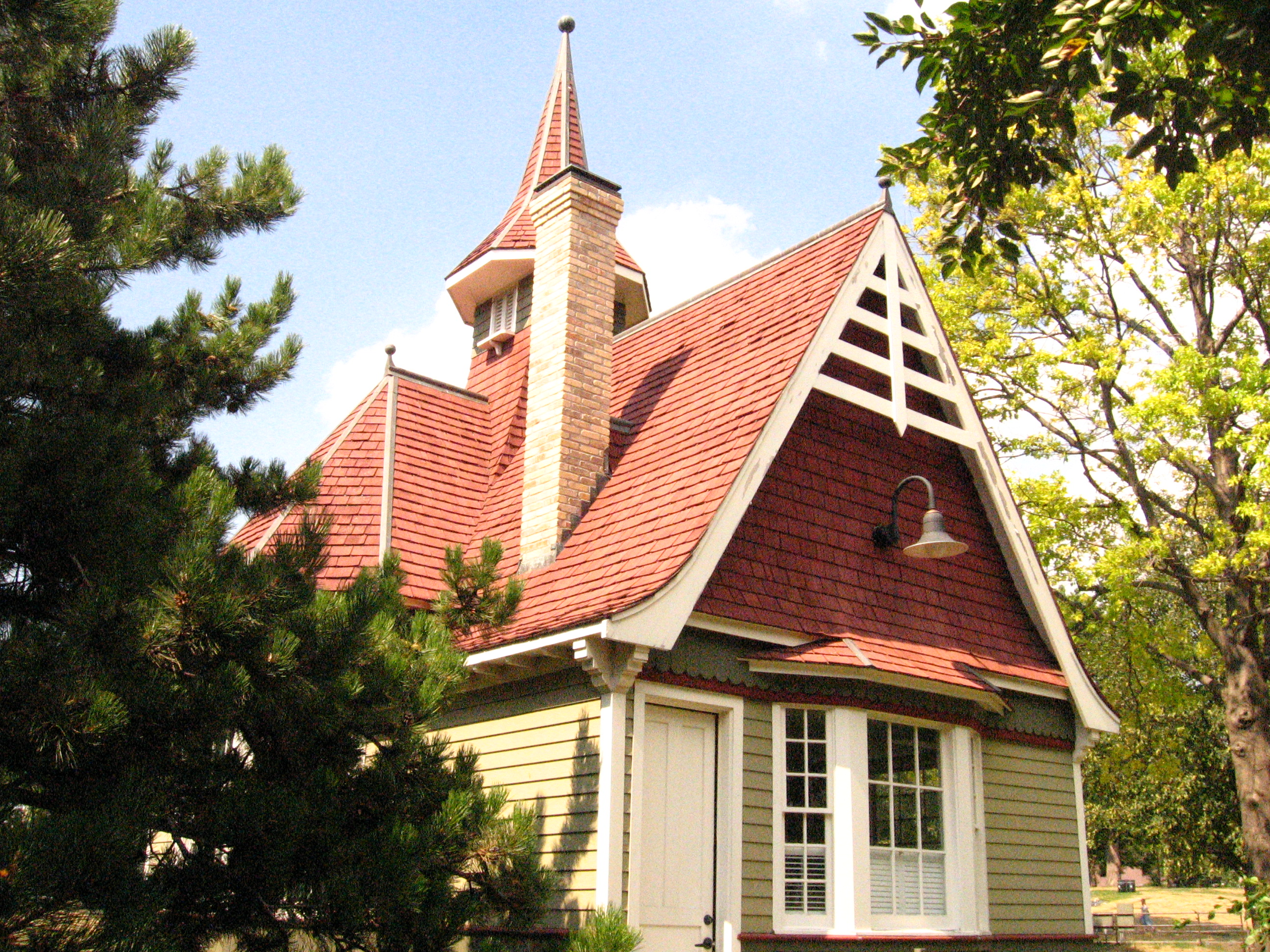
William Berry house

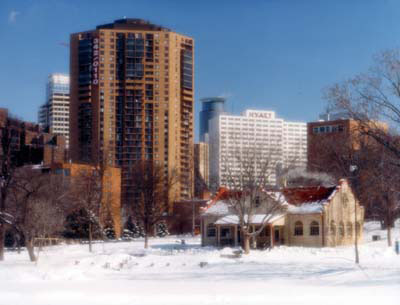
Loring Park in winter, park center erected c. 1906

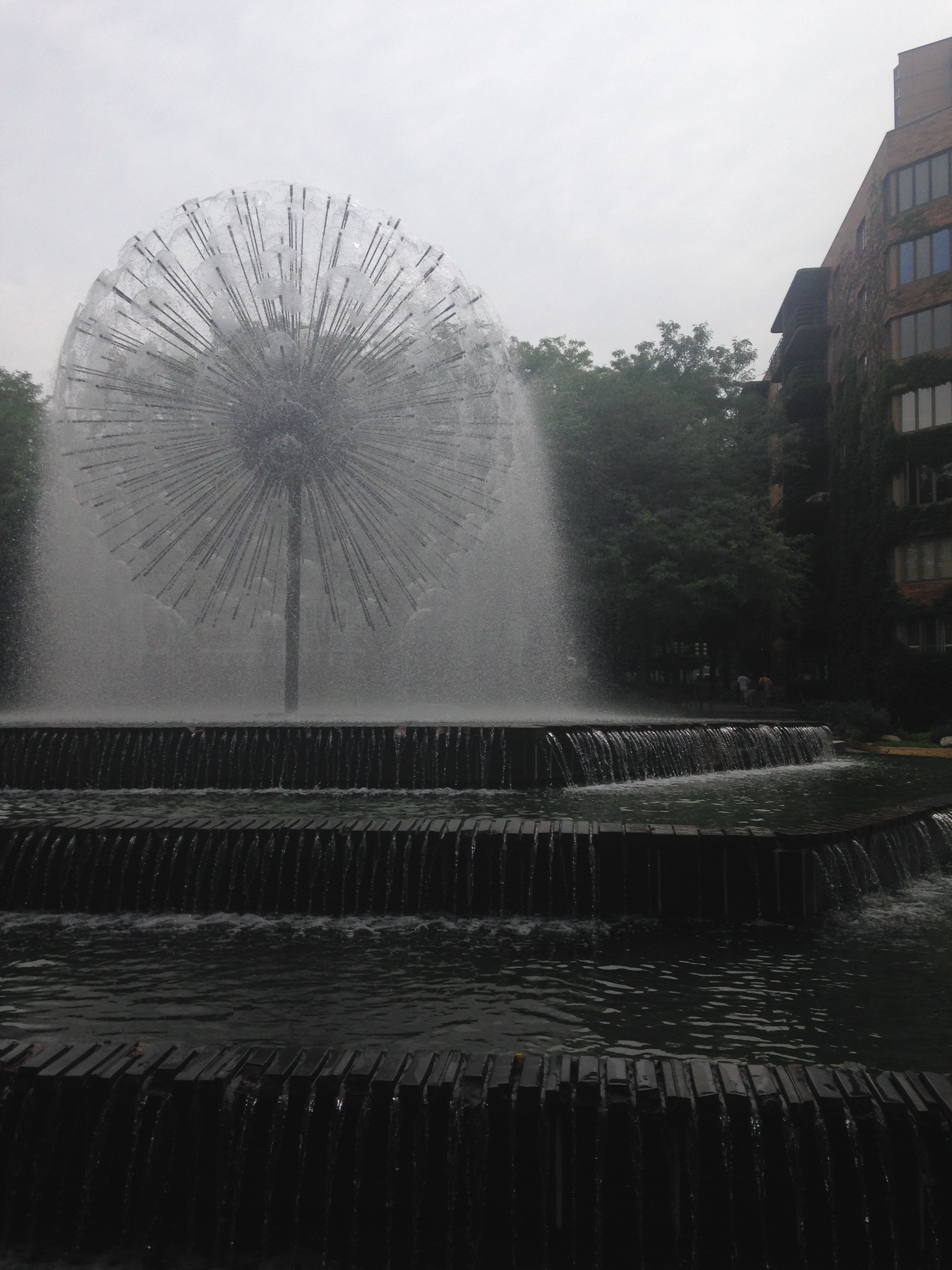
Berger Fountain

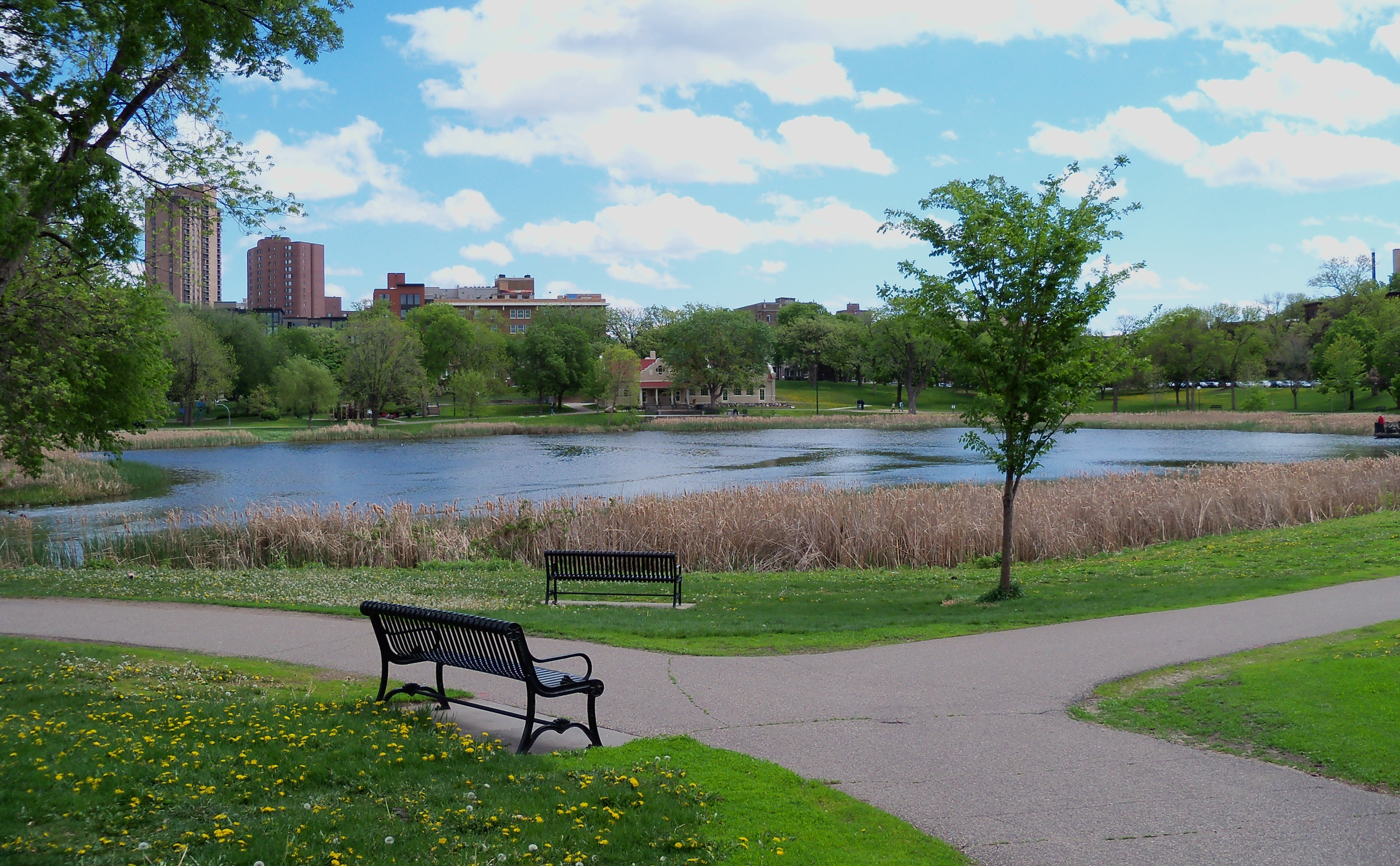
Loring Lake with benches and walking paths

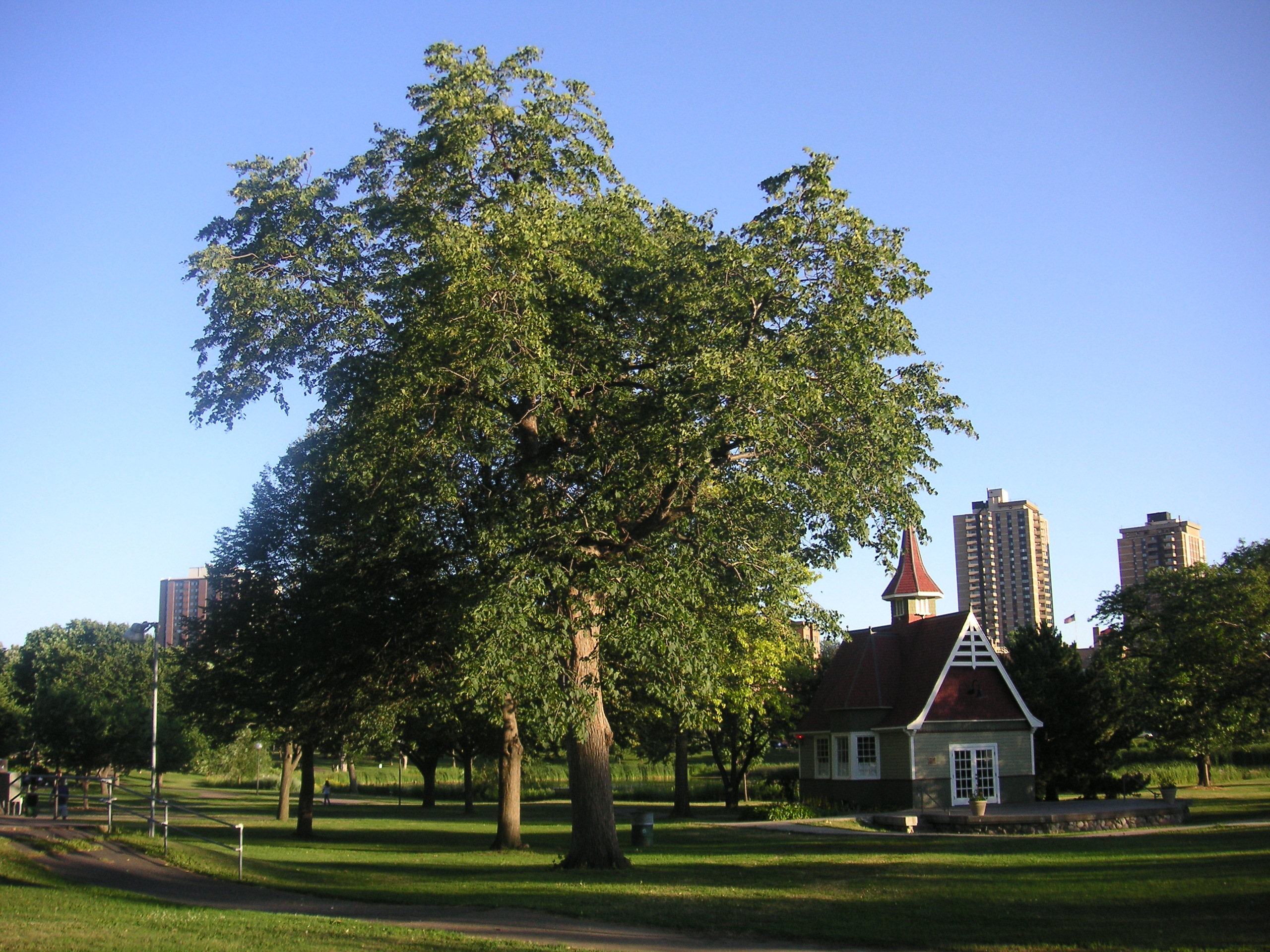
Loring Park in the Summertime

== Loring Greenway ==
The Loring Greenway is a 1,500-foot linear park that connects Nicollet Mall in downtown directly to Loring Park. It opened in 1979, and though it is public space owned by the city, much of the award-winning landscaping has been maintained by volunteers with the Loring Greenway Association in the decades since. By 2016, nearly 1,600 people were using the greenway daily for walking or biking, or for its playgrounds and other amenities.

== References in popular culture ==
Loring Park is mentioned extensively by Craig Finn by the name "Penetration Park" in songs by his bands Lifter Puller and Hold Steady. Portions of the television series Man v. Food's first-season finale were filmed in Loring Park.
