= List of tallest buildings in Minneapolis =

Skyline of Minneapolis
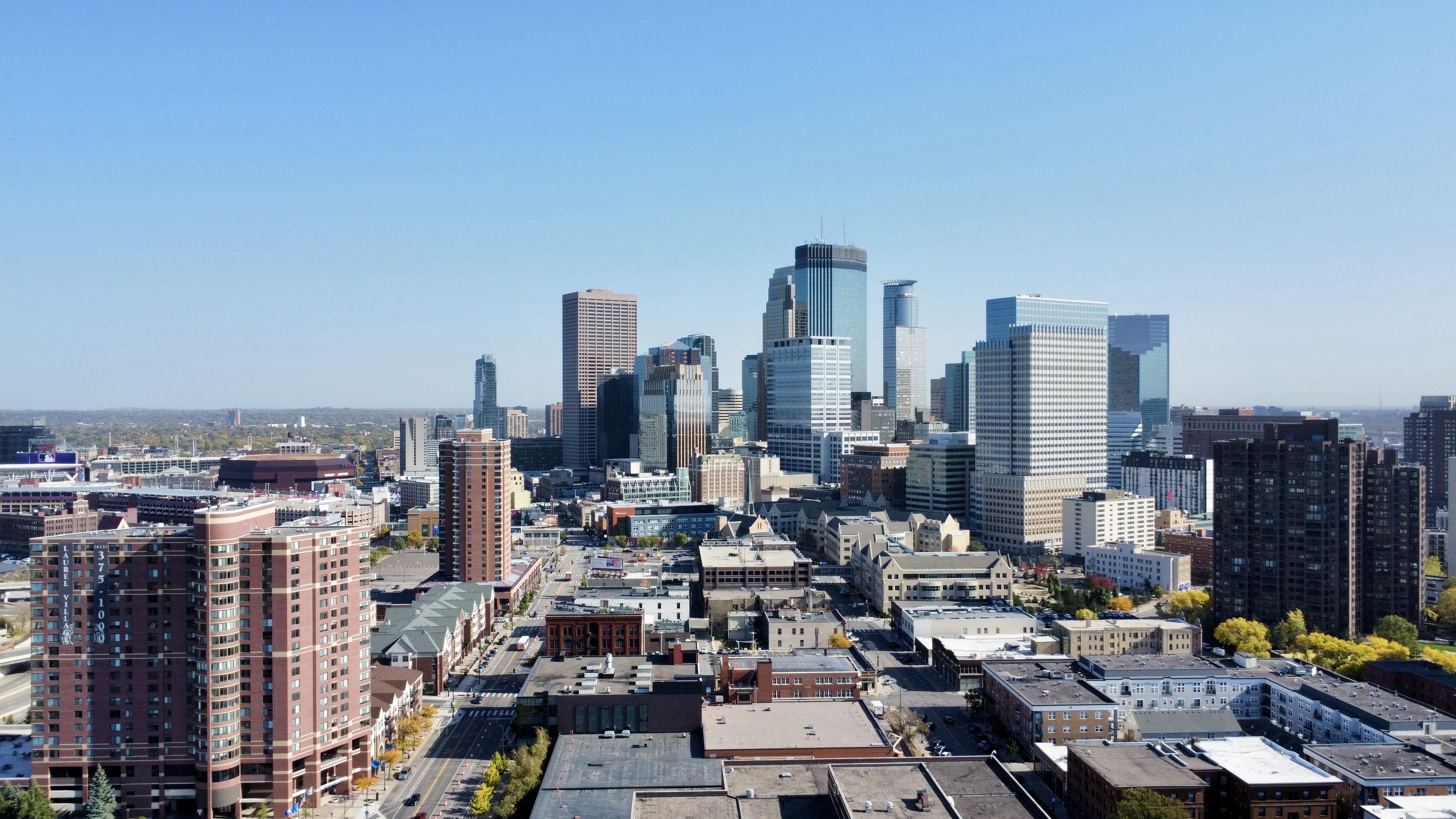
- Central Minneapolis in 2024
- Tallest building: IDS Center (1973)
- Tallest building height: 792 ft (241.4 m)
- First 150 m+ building: IDS Center

Number of tall buildings (2026)
- Taller than 100 m (328 ft): 31
- Taller than 150 m (492 ft): 11
- Taller than 200 m (656 ft): 4

Number of tall buildings — feet
- Taller than 300 ft (91.4 m): 41

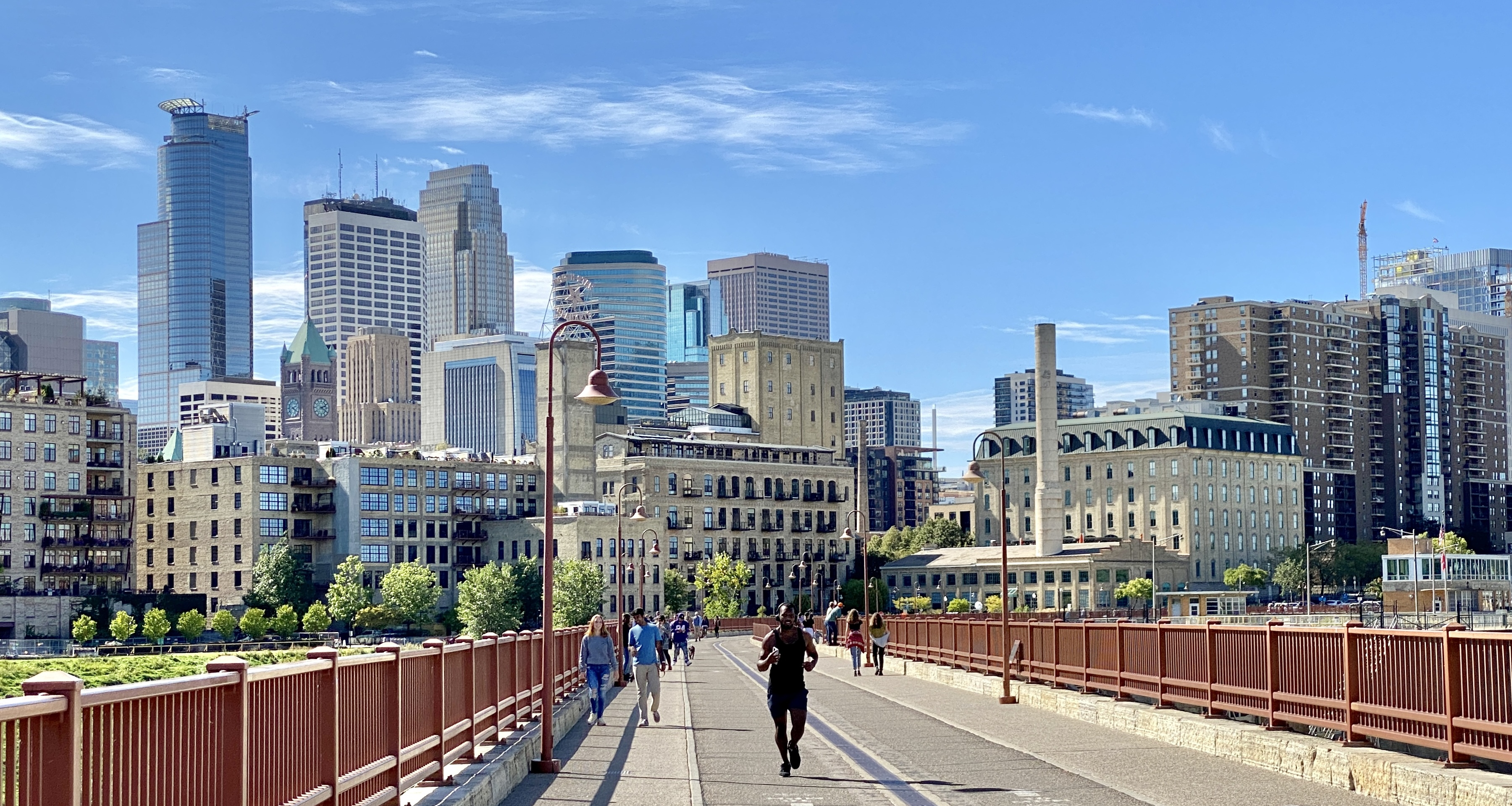
The Minneapolis skyline from the Stone Arch Bridge in 2023

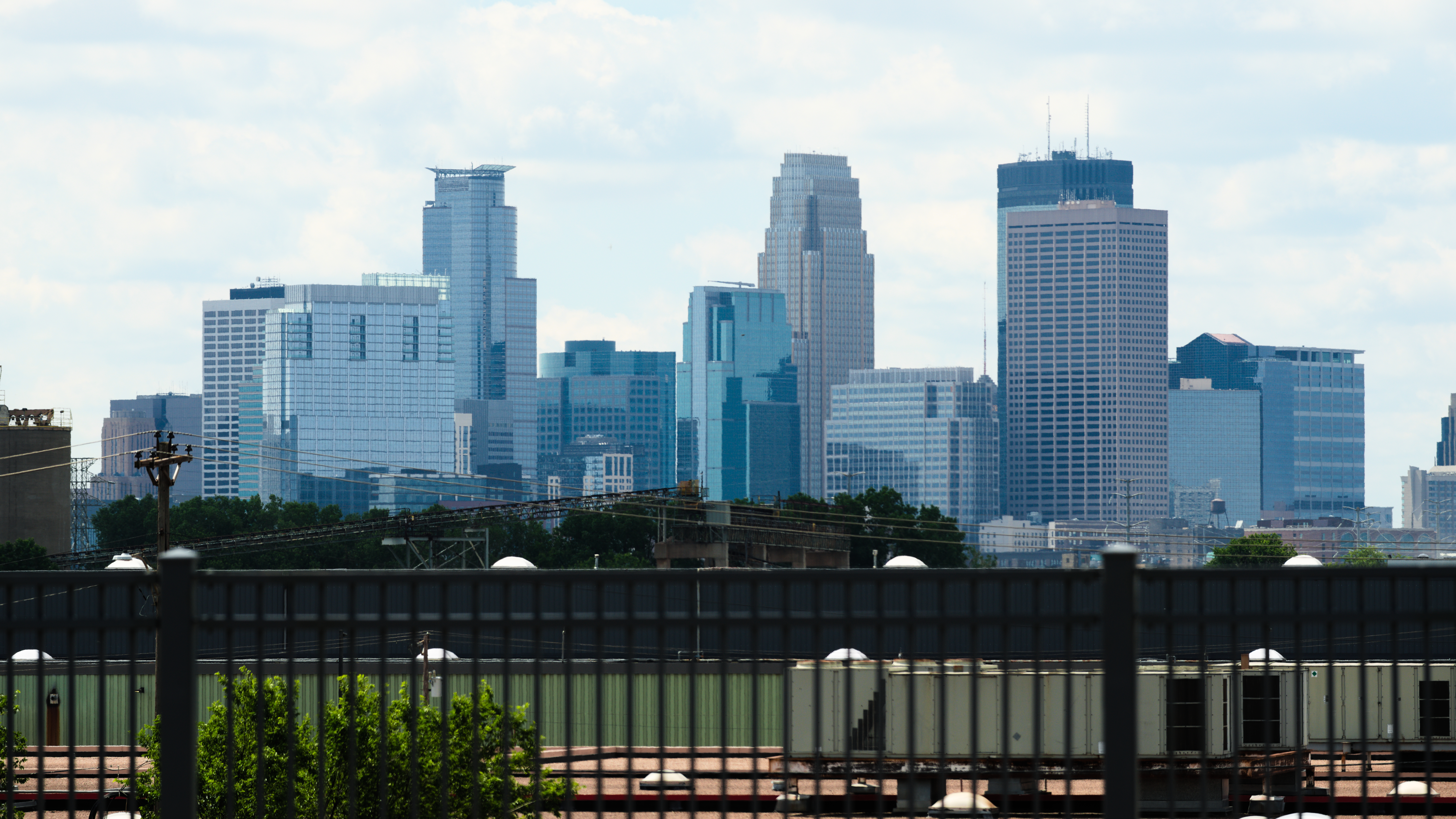
Minneapolis' skyline from McKinley, 2022

Minneapolis, the largest city in the U.S. state of Minnesota, is home to 190 completed high-rises, 41 of which stand taller than 300 feet (91 m) as of 2026. Of these, 11 have a height greater than 492 ft (150 m). Minneapolis has the second largest skyline in the Midwestern United States, after Chicago, with the second most buildings taller than 300 ft (91 m) or 492 ft (150 m) in the region. The tallest building in Minneapolis is the 57-story IDS Center, which rises 792 feet (241 m) and was designed by architect Philip Johnson. It is also the tallest building in Minnesota. Minneapolis and neighboring Saint Paul form the core of the Twin Cities, a metropolitan area of 3.7 million. Saint Paul has a smaller high-rise skyline of its own, approximately eight miles east of Downtown Minneapolis. Most of the tallest buildings in Downtown Minneapolis are linked via the Minneapolis Skyway System, the largest pedestrian skywalk system in the world.

The history of skyscrapers in Minneapolis began with the construction of the Lumber Exchange Building in 1886; at 165 feet (50 m) and 12 floors, it is often regarded as the first skyscraper in Minnesota and one of the first fire-proof buildings in the country. The Lumber Exchange Building stands as the oldest structure outside of New York City with at least 12 floors. Minneapolis went through a small building boom in the early 1920s. This period saw the construction of the Lumen Technologies Building and the Foshay Tower, which was modelled after the Washington Monument. The Foshay Tower overtook the City Hall as the city's tallest building. Due to the Great Depression, few tall buildings were completed from the 1930s to 1950s.

A more substantial building boom lasted from the 1960s to the early 1990s. When it was completed in 1973, the IDS Center was much taller than any other building in Minneapolis at the time. Minneapolis' skyline grew especially quickly in the 1980s, culminating in the completion of its third tallest building, Wells Fargo Center, in 1988, and its second tallest, Capella Tower, in 1992. Both structures are some of the city's most prominent examples of postmodern architecture, and at 775 and 776 ft, they nearly matched the height of the IDS Center. Several residential towers such as the Brutalist Riverside Plaza and Churchill Apartments were built as well. In the 21st century, notable projects include the residential towers of Eleven on the River and The Carlyle, both along the Mississippi River, with Eleven on the River being the tallest residential building in the state when it was completed in 2022.

Most of Minneapolis' tall buildings are located in or around Downtown Minneapolis in Central, southwest of the Mississippi River. Recent additions have extend the city's high-rise footprint eastwards to Elliot Park and to Downtown East, with Eleven on the River being the tallest building there. These neighborhoods surround U.S. Bank Stadium, home to the Minnesota Vikings football team. The downtown skyline has also begun to expand westwards past Interstate 394, with the 418 ft (127 m) North Loop Green completed in North Loop in 2024. Across the river, the Nicollet Island/East Bank area has seen a number of new high-rise condominiums, such as the 26-story Rafter in 2019 and the 25-story The Expo in 2020.

== History ==
Number of buildings by height in Minneapolis by the end of each year, based on the information in this article. Click on the legend to toggle a specific height on or off. View chart definition.

== Cityscape ==
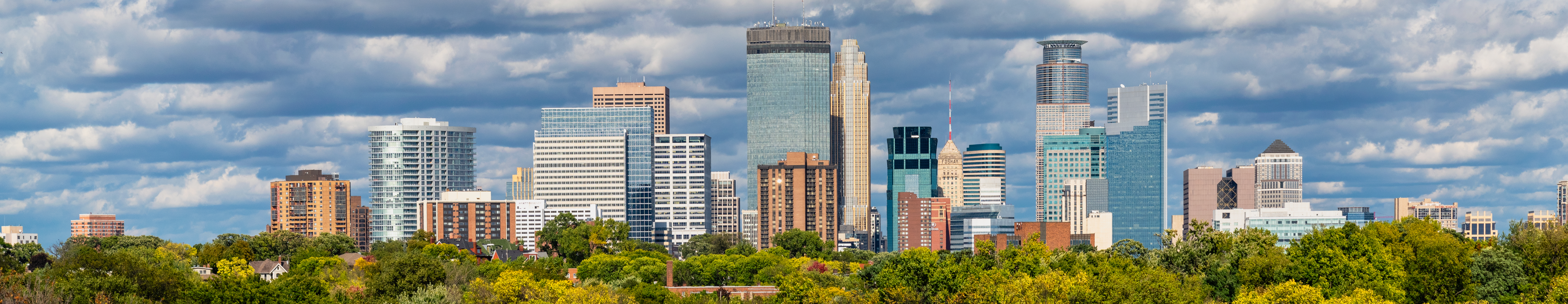
Minneapolis on an afternoon in 2019

== Map of tallest buildings ==
The map below shows the location of every building taller than 300 feet (91 m) in Minneapolis. Each marker is numbered by the building's height rank, and colored by the decade of its completion.

Buildings taller than 300 ft (91 m) in Minneapolis.
- 1950s and before
- 1960s
- 1970s
- 1980s
- 1990s
- 2000s
- 2010s
- 2020s
1 IDS Center
2 Capella Tower
3 Wells Fargo Center
4 33 South Sixth
5 Two22
6 US Bank Plaza I
7 Eleven on the River
8 60 South Sixth
9 RBC Gateway
10 Fifth Street Towers II
11 707 2nd Avenue South
12 Target Plaza South
13 PwC Plaza
14 The Carlyle
15 US Bancorp Center
16 901 Marquette
17 SPS Tower
18 Foshay Tower
19 North Loop Green
20 CenturyLink Building
21 Hennepin County Government Center
22 50 South Sixth
23 Minneapolis Marriott City Center Hotel
24 LaSalle Plaza
25 Canadian Pacific Plaza
26 LPM Apartments
27 McKnight Tower Apartments
28 Fifth Street Towers I
29 Minneapolis City Hall
30 100 Washington Square
31 365 Nicollet
32 Marquette Place Apartments
33 US Bank Plaza II
34 RSM Plaza
35 Churchill Apartments
36 4Marq
37 La Rive Condominiums
38 Rand Tower
39 110 Grant Apartments
40 IVY Hotel + Residences
41 The Expo

== Tallest buildings ==
This list ranks Minneapolis skyscrapers that stand at least 300 feet (91 m) tall as of 2026, based on standard height measurement. This includes spires and architectural details but does not include antenna masts. The "Year" column indicates the year in which a building was completed. Buildings tied in height are sorted by year of completion with earlier buildings ranked first, and then alphabetically.

Was the tallest building in Minneapolis upon completion

Rank	Name	Image	Location	Height ft (m)	Floors	Year	Purpose	Notes
1	IDS Center		44°58′34″N 93°16′21″W	792 (241.4)	55	1973	Office	Originally built as the global headquarters for Ameriprise Financial (then called Investors Diversified Services, Inc.), the building also served as the headquarters for Target Corporation (then Dayton Hudson Corporation) before the opening of Target Plaza. Tallest building in Minnesota since its completion in 1973.
2	Capella Tower		44°58′35″N 93°16′07″W	776 (236.5)	56	1992	Office	Tallest building completed in Minneapolis in the 1990s. Originally known as First Bank Place and built as the global headquarters for the First Bank System, now U.S. Bancorp; formerly known as US Bancorp Tower.
3	Wells Fargo Center		44°58′36″N 93°16′15″W	775 (236.3)	56	1988	Office	Tallest building completed in Minneapolis in the 1980s. Originally known as the Norwest Center and built as the global headquarters of Norwest Corporation, now Wells Fargo.
4	33 South Sixth		44°58′41″N 93°16′22″W	668 (203.6)	52	1983	Office	Tallest building in Minneapolis west of Nicollet Mall.Adjacent to the City Center shopping center and the Minneapolis Marriott City Center Hotel Originally known as the International Multifoods Tower and built as the global headquarters of International Multifoods Corporation, now part of The J.M. Smucker Company.
5	Two22		44°58′25″N 93°16′12″W	581 (177.2)	42	1985	Office	Originally known as the Piper Jaffray Tower and built as the global headquarters for Piper Jaffray, then later known as Campbell Mithun Tower until 2019. Second-tallest glass-curtain wall building in Minneapolis, behind the IDS Tower.
6	US Bank Plaza I		44°58′38″N 93°16′03″W	561 (171)	40	1981	Office	Originally known as Pillsbury Center and built as the global headquarters for the Pillsbury Company, now part of General Mills
7	Eleven on the River	A tall, white building	44°58′38″N 93°15′00″W	547 (166.7)	44	2022	Residential	Tallest residential building in Minnesota. Tallest building in Downtown East.
8	60 South Sixth		44°58′41″N 93°16′15″W	538 (164.1)	40	1992	Office	Formerly known as RBC Plaza. Originally known as Dain Rauscher Plaza.
9	RBC Gateway		44°58′53″N 93°16′10″W	523 (159.3)	35	2022	Mixed-use	U.S. headquarters for RBC Wealth Management. Mixed-use residential, office, and hotel building.
10	Fifth Street Towers II		44°58′41″N 93°16′05″W	504 (153.5)	36	1988	Office	
11	707 2nd Avenue South		44°58′31″N 93°16′09″W	497 (151.6)	31	2000	Office	Originally built as the global Headquarters for Ameriprise Financial. Tallest single-tenant office tower in Central Minneapolis. Tallest office building constructed in the United States in the year 2000. Formerly known as Ameriprise Financial Center. Originally American Express Tower.
12	Target Plaza South		44°58′25″N 93°16′34″W	492 (149.9)	33	2001	Office	Global headquarters for Target Corporation.
13	PwC Plaza		44°58′38″N 93°16′25″W	474 (144.6)	36	1987	Mixed-use	Mixed-use office and hotel building. PwC Plaza houses the Minneapolis office of London-based professional services firm PricewaterhouseCoopers. The Royal Sonesta Minneapolis Downtown hotel occupies floors 3-16 of PwC Plaza.
14	The Carlyle		44°58′54″N 93°15′47″W	469 (142.9)	41	2007	Residential	Tallest all-residential building in Minneapolis from 2007 until the completion of Eleven in 2022.
15	US Bancorp Center		44°58′32″N 93°16′26″W	468 (142.5)	32	2000	Office	Global Headquarters for US Bancorp.
16	901 Marquette		44°58′26″N 93°16′21″W	467 (142.3)	34	1991	Office	Formerly known as AT&T Tower.
17	SPS Tower		44°58′27″N 93°16′03″W	454 (138.5)	33	1987	Office	Originally known as Lincoln Center; formerly known as Accenture Tower. Known as SPS Tower since 2018.
18	Foshay Tower		44°58′28″N 93°16′17″W	448 (136.6)	32	1929	Hotel	Tallest building in Minneapolis from 1929 until 1973. Tallest building completed in Minneapolis in the 1920s. Currently known officially as W Minneapolis - The Foshay.
19	North Loop Green	–	44°58′59″N 93°16′36″W	418 (127.4)	38	2024	Residential	Tallest building in North Loop.
20	CenturyLink Building		44°58′39″N 93°16′00″W	416 (126.8)	26	1932	Office	Originally constructed in 1932 with a height of 346 feet (105 m); height increased to 416 feet (127 m) in 1958 with the addition of a penthouse and rooftop structure. Originally known as Northwestern Bell Telephone Building; formerly known as the Qwest Building. Tallest building completed in Minneapolis in the 1930s.
21	Hennepin County Government Center		44°58′33″N 93°16′00″W	404 (123.2)	24	1977	Government	Tallest government building in Minnesota.
22	50 South Sixth		44°58′42″N 93°16′19″W	404 (123.1)	30	2001	Office	
23	Minneapolis Marriott City Center Hotel		44°58′40″N 93°16′24″W	392 (119.4)	32	1983	Hotel	
24	LaSalle Plaza		44°58′35″N 93°16′31″W	386 (117.6)	28	1991	Office	Adjacent to the Historic State Theatre.
25	Canadian Pacific Plaza		44°58′38″N 93°16′08″W	377 (114.8)	28	1960	Office	Tallest building completed in Minneapolis in the 1960s. Originally known as First National Bank Building; formerly known as One Financial Plaza or One Financial Center.
26	LPM Apartments		44°58′09″N 93°16′49″W	374 (114.1)	36	2014	Residential	Tallest building completed in Minneapolis in the 2010s. Tallest building in Loring Park.
27	McKnight Tower Apartments		44°58′09″N 93°14′54″W	365 (111.1)	39	1973	Residential	Tallest all-residential building in Minneapolis from 1973 until the completion of The Carlyle in 2007. Tallest building in the University community and the Cedar-Riverside neighborhood.
28	Fifth Street Towers I		44°58′42″N 93°16′07″W	356 (108.4)	26	1987	Office	
29	Minneapolis City Hall		44°58′39″N 93°15′55″W	341 (103.9)	14	1906	Government	Home to the city government. While construction lasted until 1906, the structural exterior was essentially complete by 1895. Listed on the National Register of Historic Places.
30	100 Washington Square		44°58′52″N 93°15′57″W	341 (103.8)	22	1981	Office	
31	365 Nicollet	365Nicollet	44°58′48″N 93°16′09″W	334 (101.7)	30	2018	Residential	
32	Marquette Place Apartments		44°58′12″N 93°16′36″W	327 (99.8)	36	1985	Residential	
33	US Bank Plaza II		44°58′36″N 93°16′04″W	321 (97.9)	23	1981	Office	Originally known as Pillsbury Center and built as the world headquarters for the Pillsbury Company, now part of General Mills.
34	RSM Plaza		44°58′32″N 93°16′23″W	318 (97)	20	1969	Office	Originally known as Midwest Plaza; formerly known as McGladrey Plaza.
35	Churchill Apartments		44°58′58″N 93°15′54″W	316 (96.2)	33	1981	Residential	
36	4Marq	–	44°58′45″N 93°16′08″W	312 (95)	30	2015	Residential	
37	La Rive Condominiums		44°59′09″N 93°15′27″W	312 (95)	29	1987	Residential	Tallest building in Minneapolis east of the Mississippi River. Tallest building in Nicollet Island/East Bank.
38	Rand Tower		44°58′39″N 93°16′11″W	311 (94.7)	27	1929	Office	Listed on the National Register of Historic Places
39	110 Grant Apartments		44°58′15″N 93°16′49″W	309 (94.2)	32	1985	Residential	Also written as One Ten Grant.
40	IVY Hotel + Residences		44°58′17″N 93°16′21″W	302 (91.9)	25	2008	MIxed-use	Mixed-use hotel and residential building.
41	The Expo	–	44°59′09″N 93°15′12″W	300 (91.4)	25	2020	Residential	

=== Tallest buildings by pinnacle height ===
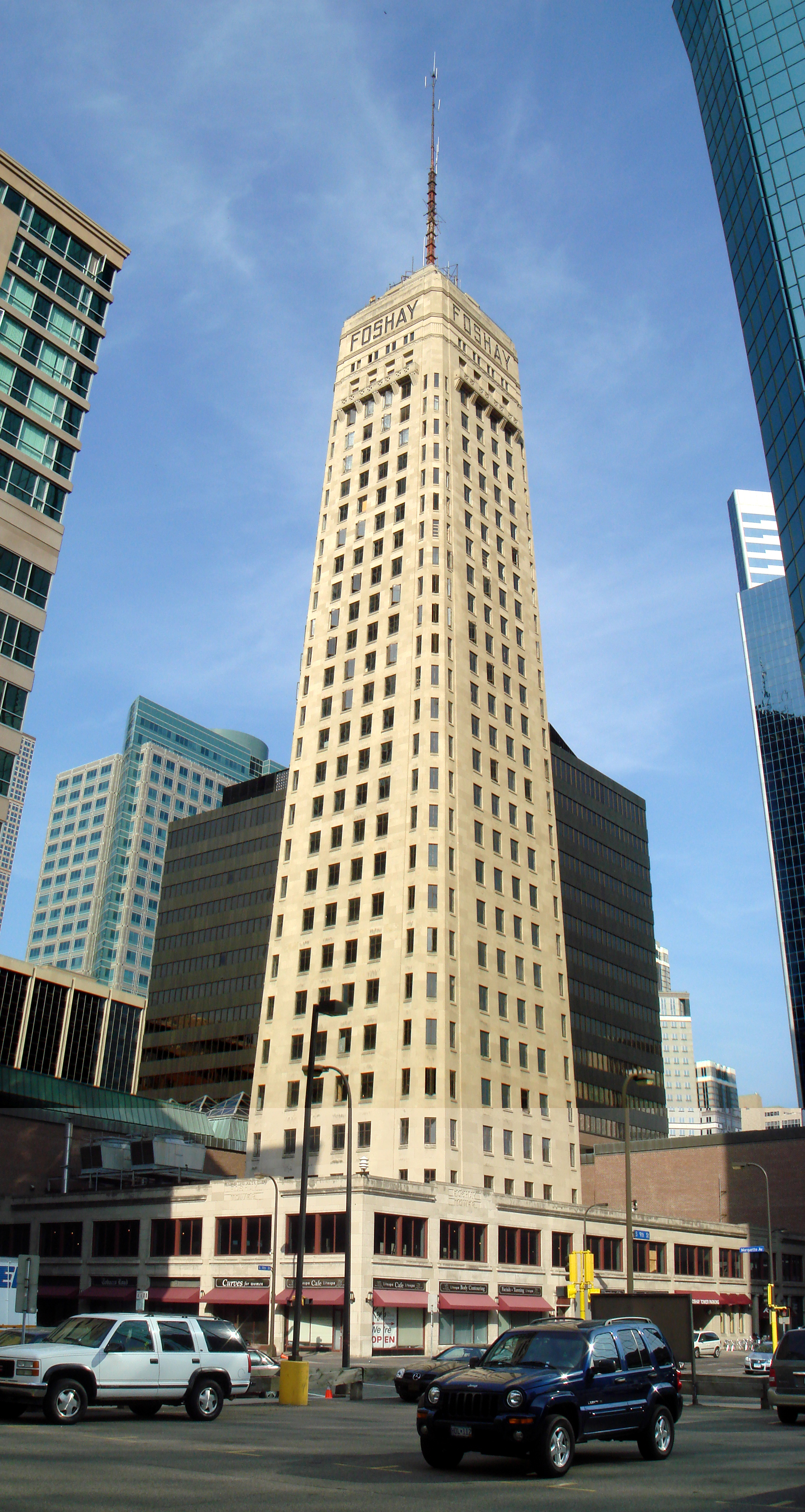
The Foshay Tower is the fifth-tallest building in Minneapolis when measuring by pinnacle height.

This list ranks Minneapolis skyscrapers based on their pinnacle height, which includes radio masts and antennas. As architectural features and spires can be regarded as subjective, some skyscraper enthusiasts prefer this method of measurement. Standard architectural height measurement, which excludes antennas in building height, is included for comparative purposes.

Rank	Name	Pinnacle height ft (m)	Standard height ft (m)	Reference
1	IDS Center	910 (277)	792 (241)	
2	Capella Tower	776 (237)	776 (237)	
3	Wells Fargo Center	775 (236)	775 (236)	
4	33 South Sixth	668 (204)	668 (204)	
5	Foshay Tower	607 (185)	448 (137)	
6	Two22	579 (176)	579 (176)	
7	US Bank Plaza I	561 (171)	561 (171)	
8	Eleven on the River	547 (167)	547 (167)	
9	60 South Sixth	539 (164)	539 (164)	
10	RBC Gateway	523 (159)	523 (159)	

== Timeline of tallest buildings ==
This lists buildings that once held the title of tallest building in Minneapolis.

Name	Image	Street address	Years as tallest	Height ft (m)	Floors	Notes
Globe Building		4th Street South	1882–1886	157 (48)	8	Demolished in 1958.
Lumber Exchange Building		10 5th Street South	1886–1887	165 (50)	12	
Industrial Exposition Building		101 Central Avenue Southeast	1887–1890	240 (73)	8	Demolished in 1940.
Metropolitan Building		308 2nd Avenue South	1890–1895	258 (79)	12	Demolished in 1962.
Minneapolis City Hall		350 5th Street South	1895–1929	341 (104)	14	
Foshay Tower		821 Marquette Avenue	1929–1973	448 (137)	32	
IDS Tower		80 8th Street South	1973–present	792 (241)	57	

== See also ==
- List of Registered Historic Places in Hennepin County, Minnesota
- List of tallest buildings in Minnesota
- List of tallest buildings in Saint Paul
