= PwC Plaza =

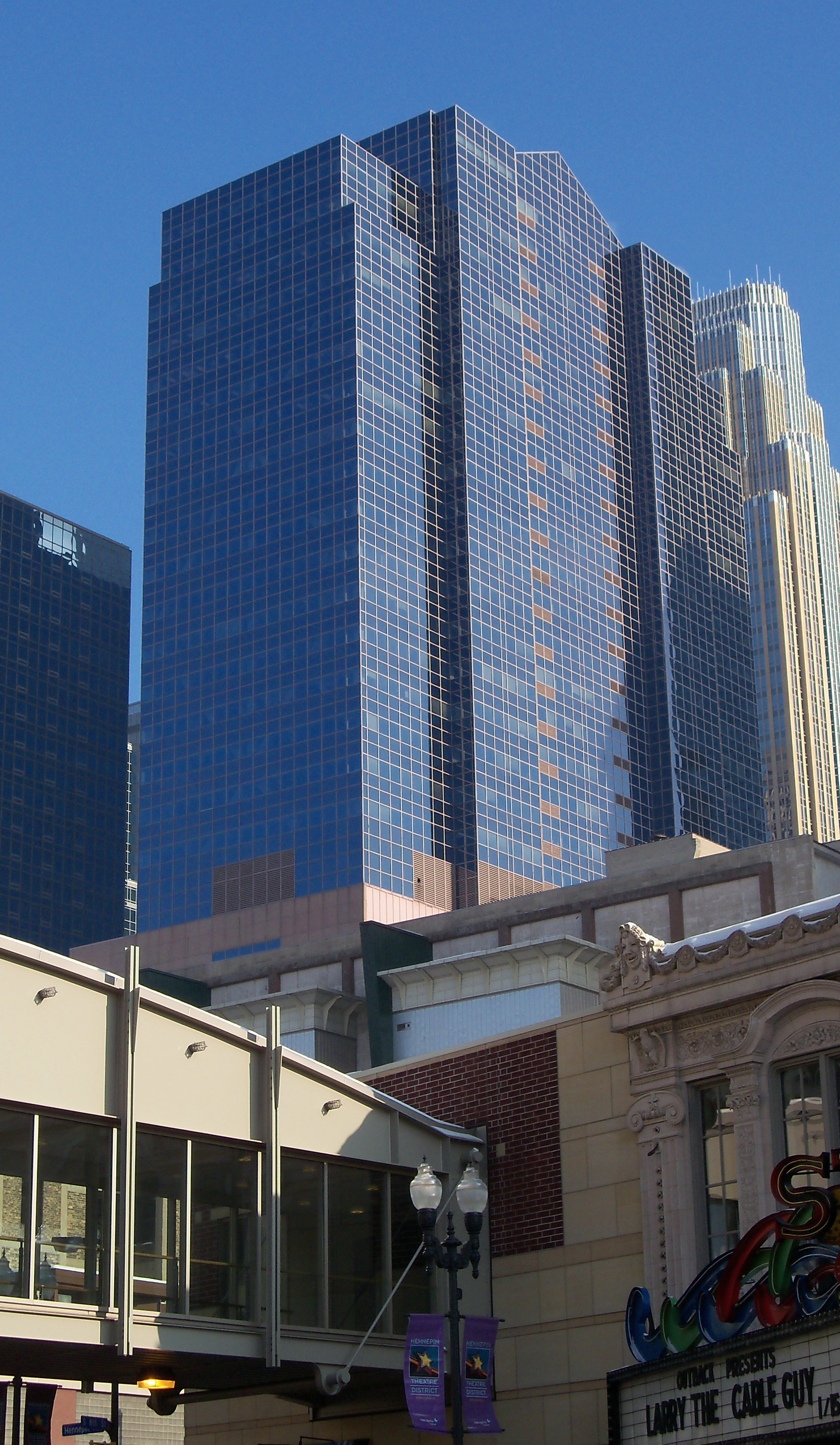
- Interactive map of the PwC Plaza area
- Former names: Plaza VII (1987–2016)
- Alternative names: Royal Sonesta Minneapolis Downtown

General information
- Status: Completed
- Type: commercial
- Location: Minneapolis, Minnesota
- Coordinates: 44°58′37.5″N 93°16′24.5″W
- Completed: 1987

Height
- Height: 475 ft (145 m)

Technical details
- Floor count: 36

PwC Plaza is a mixed-use skyscraper located at 45 South Seventh Street in Downtown West, Minneapolis, Minnesota.The tower is the 13th tallest in Minneapolis and Minnesota at 475 feet (145 m) tall. It was completed in 1987 and has 36 floors. It is the second-tallest mixed-use building in Minneapolis and contains offices, including the Minneapolis office of London-based professional services firm PricewaterhouseCoopers, and the Royal Sonesta Minneapolis Downtown hotel. The tower was the tallest mixed-use building in Minneapolis until the completion of RBC Gateway in 2022.

== See also ==
- List of tallest buildings in Minneapolis
