= U.S. Bancorp Center =

Skyscraper in Minneapolis, Minnesota

US Bancorp Center
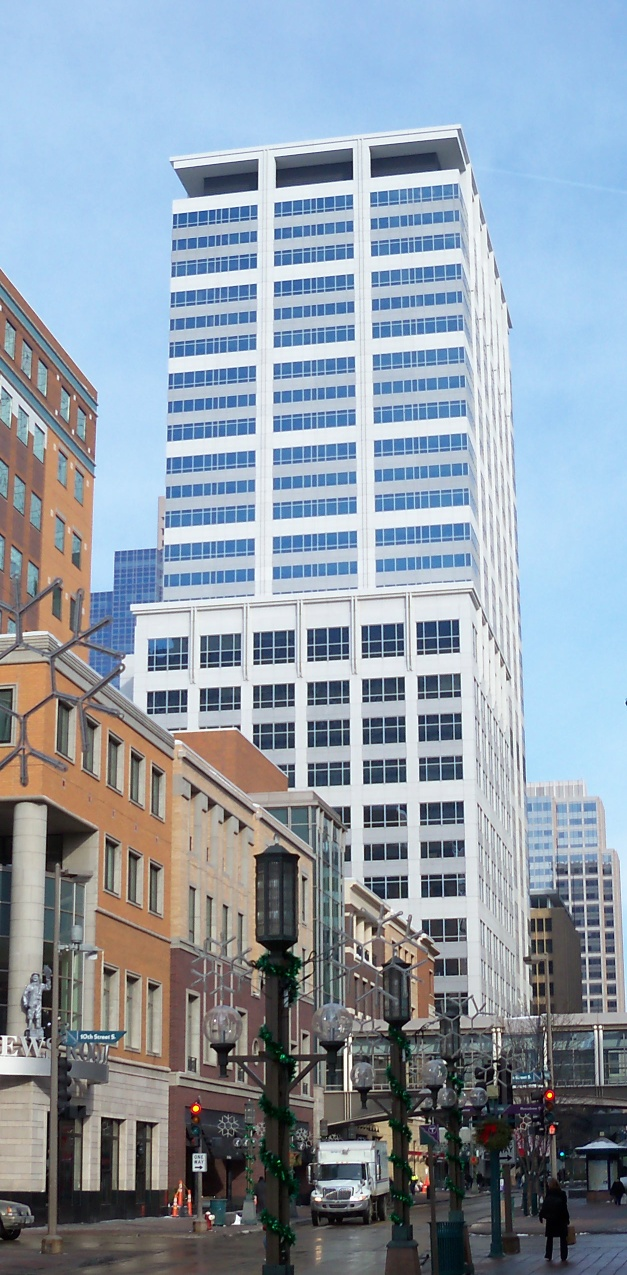

General information
- Location: Minneapolis, Minnesota, 800 Nicollet Mall
- Coordinates: 44°58′32″N 93°16′26″W
- Completed: 2000
- Owner: Piedmont Office Realty Trust

Height
- Height: 467 ft (142 m)

Technical details
- Floor count: 32
- Floor area: 929,690 sq ft (86,371 m^{2})

Design and construction
- Architecture firm: Ellerbe Becket

The U.S. Bancorp Center is a 467-ft (142 m) tall skyscraper in Minneapolis, Minnesota, United States. Completed in 2000, the 32-story building is the 15th-tallest in the city.. A skyway connects the building to the former Macy's/Daytons department store building, and Target. Several low-rise buildings were demolished to make way for this building, including the 808 Building. This is one of the three contiguous blocks designed by Ellerbe Becket from 1998 to 2001. The other two are 900 Nicollet Plaza and Target Plaza. It is the second-tallest office building completed in Minnesota since 2000, after the Ameriprise Financial Center, also in Minneapolis. The building was among those damaged by rioting during the George Floyd protests in Minneapolis–Saint Paul in May 2020. U.S. Bancorp Center has twice been awarded the International Outstanding Building of the Year award for office buildings in 2014 and 2023.

== See also ==
- List of tallest buildings in Minneapolis
