= RSM Plaza =

Building in Minneapolis, Minnesota, United States

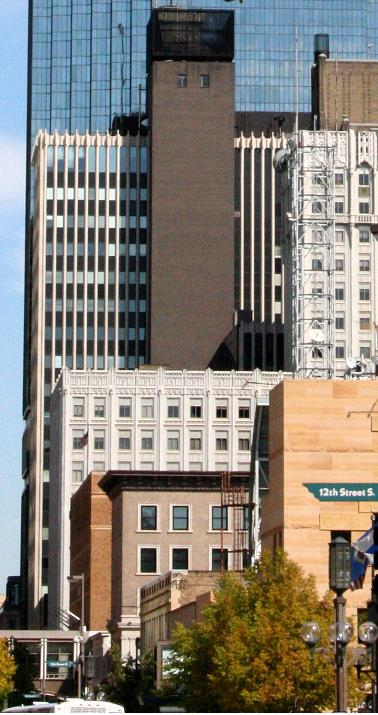
- RSM Plaza in Central Minneapolis, with the glass IDS Center in the background
- Interactive map of the RSM Plaza area
- Former names: Midwest Plaza (1969-2011); McGladrey Plaza (2011-2015)

General information
- Type: Office, retail
- Location: 801 Nicollet Mall, Minneapolis, Minnesota, United States
- Coordinates: 44°58′32″N 93°16′23″W
- Construction started: 1968
- Completed: 1969
- Opening: 1969
- Owner: GOLUB
- Management: GOLUB Realty Services LLC

Height
- Antenna spire: 320 ft (98 m)
- Roof: 276 ft (84 m)

Technical details
- Floor count: 20
- Floor area: 416,000 square feet (38,648 m^{2})

RSM Plaza is a 320-foot (98 m) tall skyscraper in Minneapolis, Minnesota. Formerly known as McGladrey Plaza, it was completed in 1969 and has 20 floors. In October 2015, the building was renamed RSM Plaza after its largest tenant, McGladrey, changed its own name to RSM. It is the 30th-tallest building in the city and is located on Nicollet Mall. At the time of its completion, the building was the fifth-tallest structure in Minneapolis and the city's second-tallest post-World War II high-rise, behind Canadian Pacific Plaza. The building is skyway connected to The Metro Apartments, the Medical Arts Building and the IDS Center.

The building was bought by GOLUB, an international real estate investment and development company, in December 2015. The structure has a floor area of 416,000 square feet (38,600 m^{2}) and an 870-space parking ramp. Major tenants of the building include RSM, Clorox, Colgate-Palmolive, and Portico Benefits.

RSM Plaza served as the home of the fictional WJM-TV station of The Mary Tyler Moore Show, an American sitcom that was broadcast on CBS from 1970 to 1977. The opening title sequence was filmed nearby on Nicollet Mall.

== See also ==
- List of tallest buildings in Minneapolis
