= Accenture Tower =

Accenture Tower refers to a building in one of various U.S. cities:

- 500 West Madison, Chicago
- 333 South Seventh Street, Minneapolis
