= 100 Washington Square =

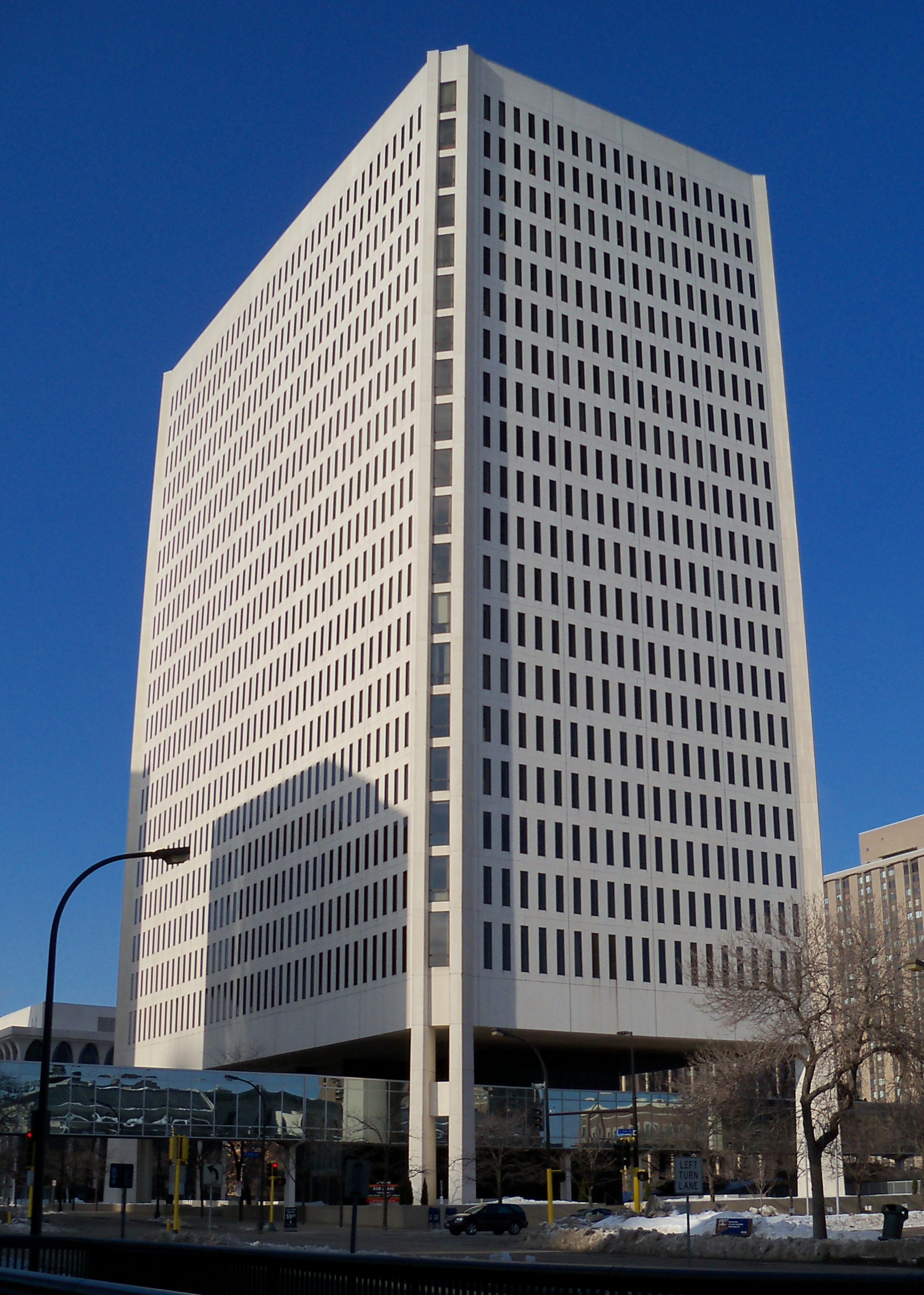

General information
- Coordinates: 44°58′52″N 93°15′57″W
- Completed: 1981

Height
- Height: 332 ft (101 m)

Technical details
- Floor count: 22
- Floor area: 762,849 sq ft (70,871.0 m^{2})

Design and construction
- Architect: Minoru Yamasaki

100 Washington Square is a 332-ft (101 m) high-rise office building located in downtown Minneapolis. Construction started in 1979 and was completed in 1981. It covers 481,600 square feet and has 22 floors. As of December 1, 2020, it is the 28th tallest building in the city. The building was designed by architect Minoru Yamasaki, who had previously designed the Northwestern National Life Building in Minneapolis and the World Trade Center in New York City. As with the Trade Center, the exterior of the building is composed of closely spaced load-bearing steel that distributes weight to the core and removes the need for internal support columns.

A skyway connects the building to Churchill Apartments, and The Crossings. In 2015, Shorenstein, a national real estate investing organization, purchased the three buildings that comprise the Washington Square campus, including 100 Washington Square.

== See also ==
- List of tallest buildings in Minneapolis
