= 60 South Sixth =

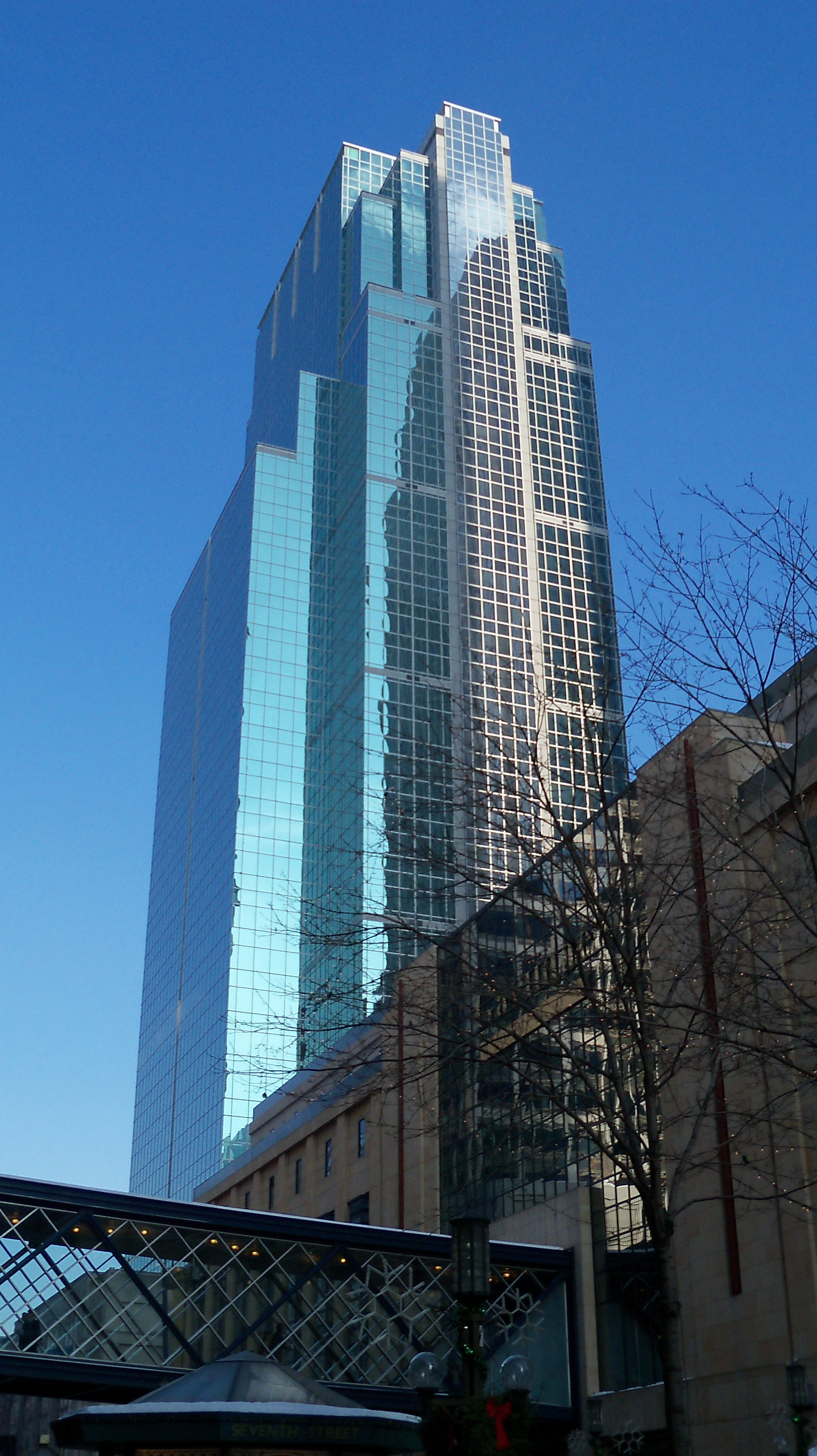
- Interactive map of the 60 South Sixth area
- Former names: RBC Plaza, Dain Rauscher Plaza

General information
- Type: Class A Office
- Location: Minneapolis, Minnesota, 60 S 6th St & 555 Nicollet Mall
- Coordinates: 44°58′40.5″N 93°16′15″W
- Current tenants: [[]]
- Construction started: 1989; 37 years ago
- Completed: 1992; 34 years ago
- Renovated: April 2015
- Owner: KBS

Height
- Height: 539 ft (164 m)

Technical details
- Floor count: 40
- Floor area: 759,986 sq ft (70,605.0 m^{2})

Design and construction
- Architecture firm: Lohan Associates, Inc.
- Main contractor: Kraus-Anderson Construction Co.; PCL Construction Management Inc.

Renovating team
- Architect: Shea

60 South Sixth is a 40-story office tower and retail center located along Nicollet Mall in downtown Minneapolis, Minnesota that served as the U.S. headquarters for RBC Wealth Management until their move to RBC Gateway in 2022. The building was formerly known as Dain Rauscher Plaza for Dain Rauscher Wessels, a regional brokerage and investment banking firm based in Minneapolis. Following the 2000 acquisition of Dain Rauscher Wessels by the Royal Bank of Canada and 2008 end of use of the brand by RBC, the building was named RBC Plaza.

It is linked to the downtown core's 64 block skyway system with three separate skyway connections.

In 2014, the building was awarded LEED certification at the Gold level by the U.S. Green Building Council. The building was also awarded an Energy Star label in 2014 for its operating efficiency.

== See also ==
- List of tallest buildings in Minneapolis
