= Eleven on the River =

Skyscraper in Minneapolis, Minnesota, U.S.

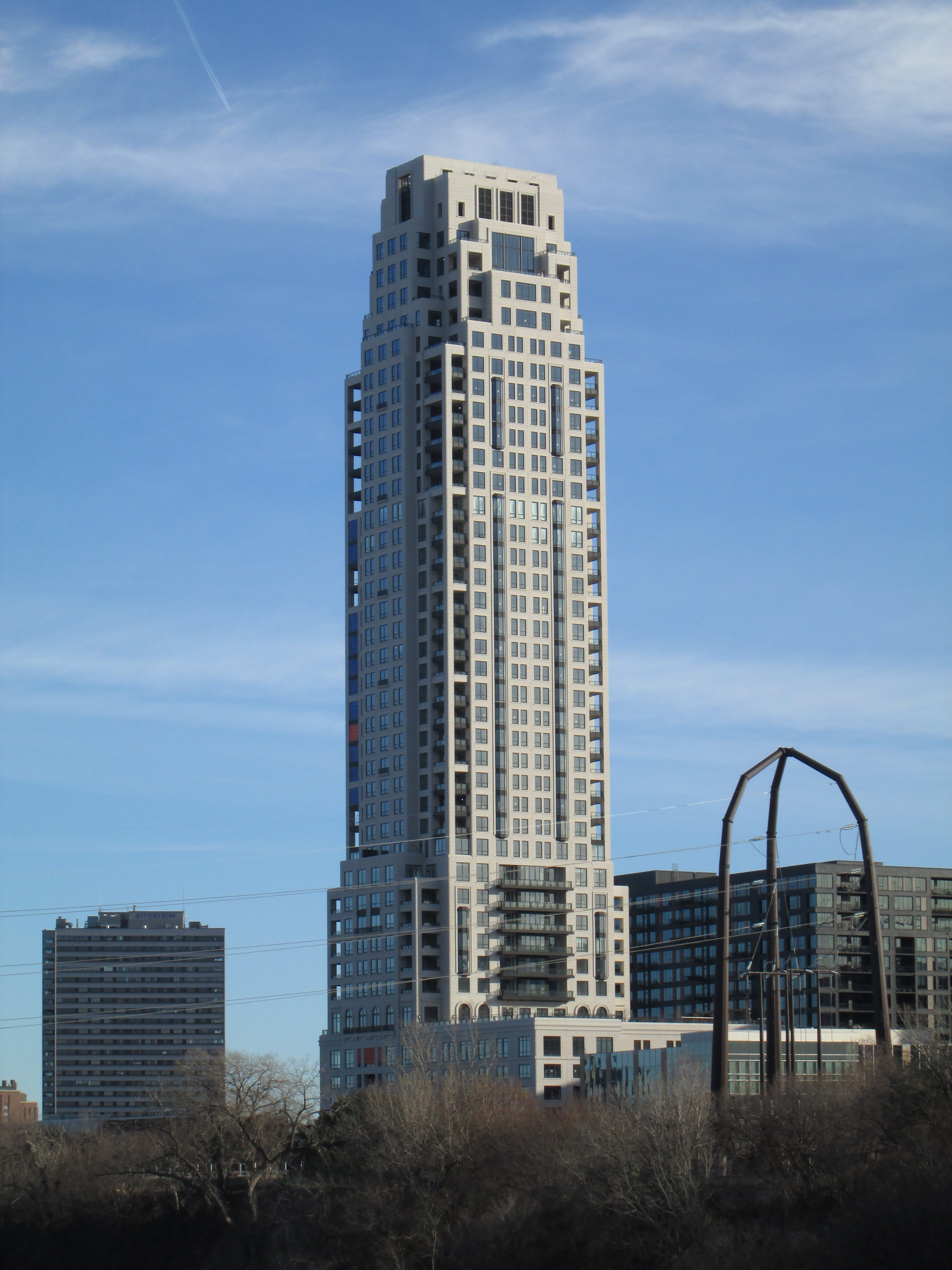
- Interactive map of the Eleven on the River area
- Alternative names: Eleven

General information
- Architectural style: Art Deco
- Location: Minneapolis, Minnesota, 1111 W River Pkwy
- Coordinates: 44°58′37″N 93°14′59″W
- Construction started: October 7, 2019
- Completed: February 2022
- Cost: $190 million

Height
- Height: 550 ft (170 m)

Technical details
- Floor count: 42

Design and construction
- Architecture firm: Robert A.M. Stern Architects / Ryan A+E, Inc. (Architect of Record)
- Main contractor: Ryan Companies US, Inc.

Eleven on the River is a 550 ft (170 m) tall skyscraper in Minneapolis, Minnesota, USA, located at 1111 W River Pkwy. Completed in 2022, Eleven has 42 floors and 120 units. It is the 7th-tallest building in Minneapolis, and the tallest residential building in Minnesota.

== History ==
On March 6, 2018, co-developers Ryan Companies US, Inc. and Luigi Bernardi, announced their intent to build a 39-story residential tower. These plans would later be expanded to a building with 41 floors, which was subsequently approved by the Minneapolis Planning Commission in October 2018. It was designed by New York City architecture firm Robert A.M. Stern Architects alongside Ryan A+E, Inc. as the architect of record.

== Construction ==
Construction on the tower began in October 2019 and was completed in 2022. Minneapolis based Ryan Companies US, Inc. served as the general contractor for the project. The estimated cost for the development is around $190 million.

== See also ==
- List of tallest buildings in Minneapolis
- List of tallest buildings in Minnesota
