= 110 Grant Apartments =

Skyscraper in Minneapolis

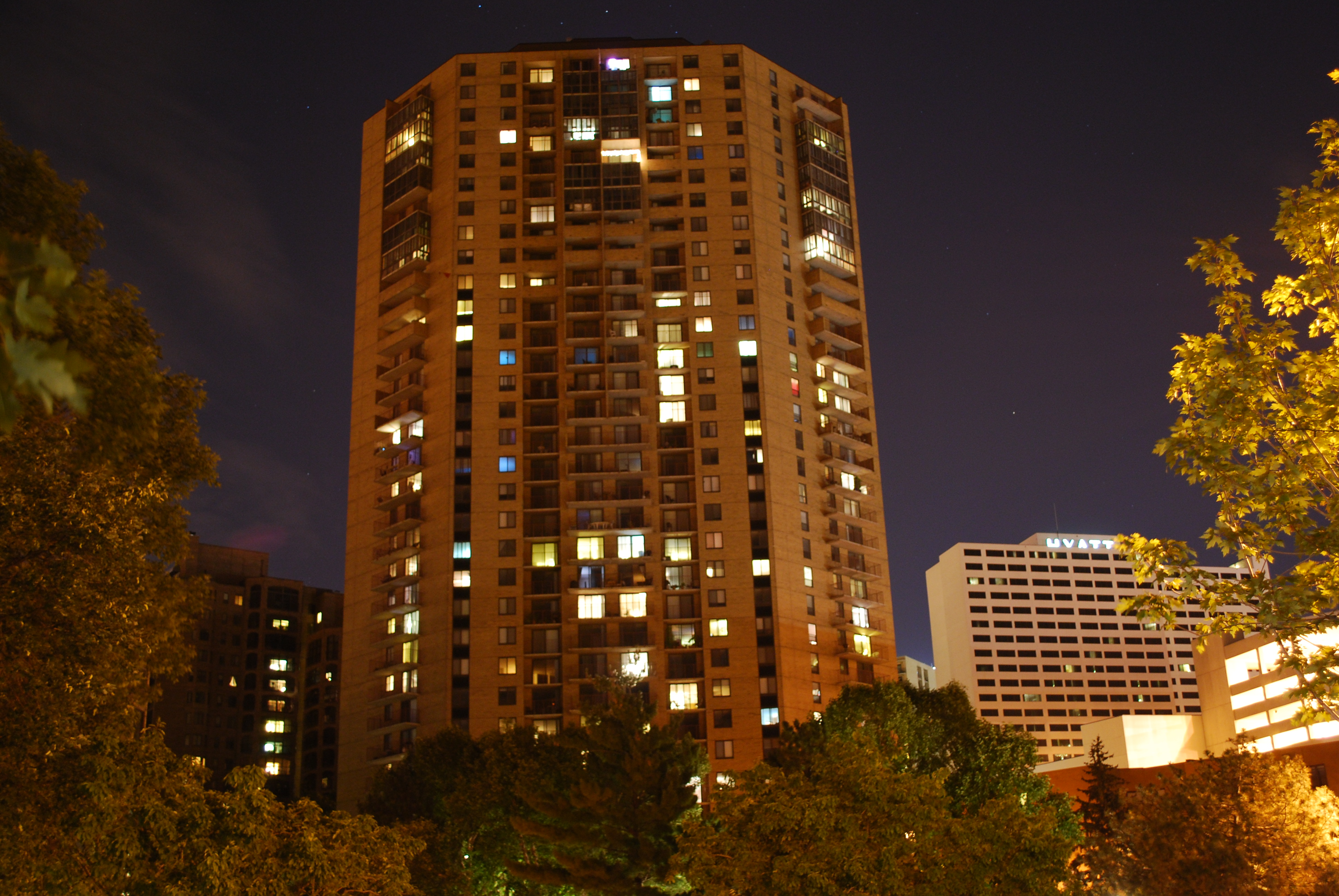
- One Ten Grant Apartments at night
- Interactive map of the 110 Grant Apartments area

General information
- Type: Concrete
- Location: Minneapolis, Minnesota, US, 110 W. Grant Street, Minneapolis, MN 55403
- Coordinates: 44°58′14″N 93°16′49″W
- Construction started: 1983
- Completed: 1985
- Landlord: One Ten Grant Limited Partnership

Height
- Height: 309 ft (94 m)

Technical details
- Floor count: 32

110 Grant Apartments is a 309-ft (94 m) tall skyscraper in Minneapolis, Minnesota, United States. The building was designed by Hammel, Green and Abrahamson. It was constructed from 1983 to 1985 and has 32 floors. It is the 32nd tallest building in Minneapolis.

Beginning in January 2026, the building experienced several severe heating outages and flooding episodes. These incidents resulted in extensive water and mold damage to the building's public areas, as well as several individual units. This damage rendered much of the building legally uninhabitable. The management company's delayed, allegedly inadequate response to these issues ultimately resulted in legal action against them.

== See also ==
- List of tallest buildings in Minneapolis
