= Two22 =

Skyscraper

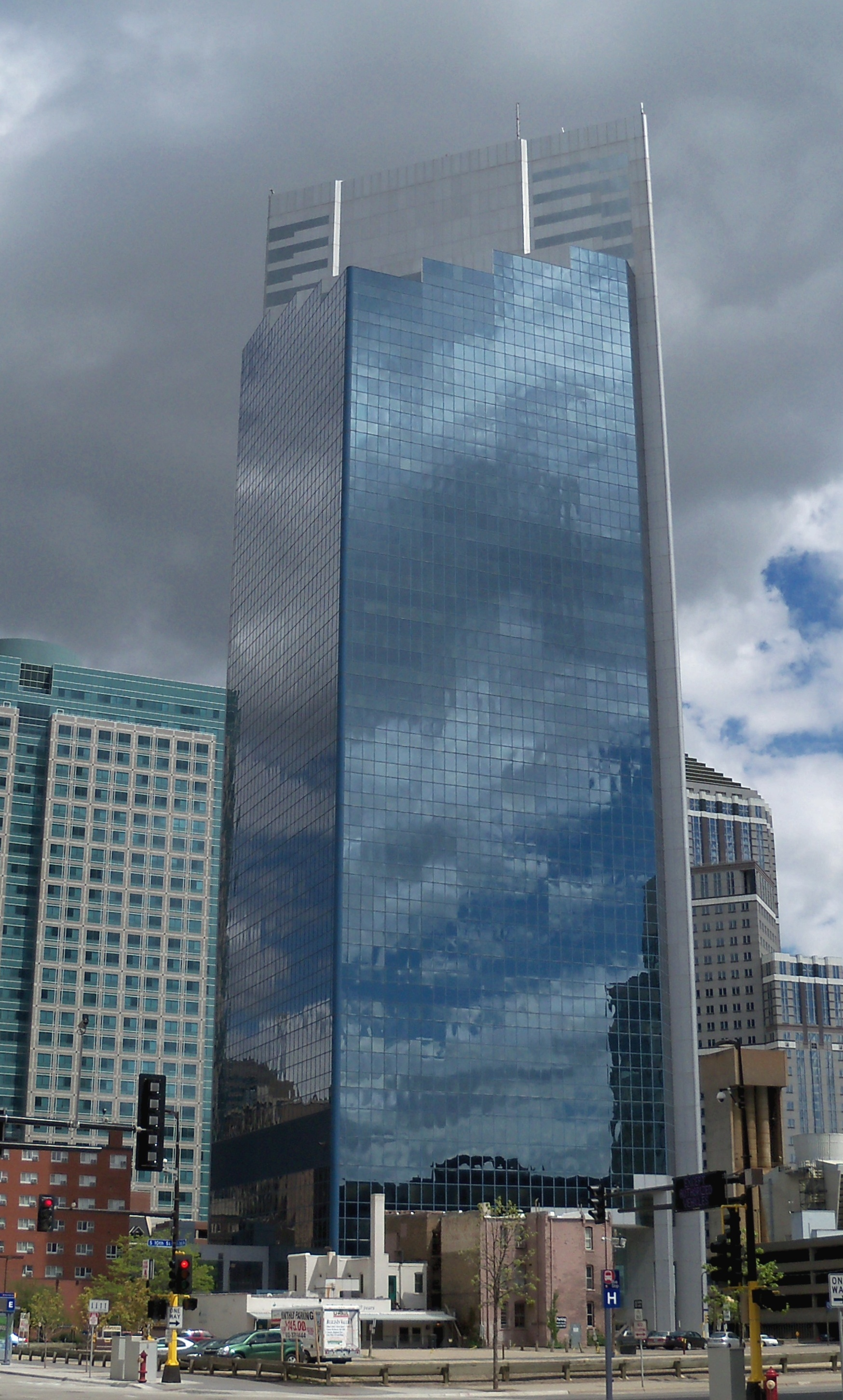
- Two22 in 2010
- Former names: Campbell Mithun Tower, Piper Jaffray Tower

General information
- Location: Minneapolis, Minnesota, 222 South Ninth Street
- Coordinates: 44°58′25″N 93°16′12″W
- Construction started: 1983; 43 years ago
- Completed: 1985; 41 years ago
- Owner: OakTree Capital Management

Technical details
- Floor count: 41
- Floor area: 901,068 sq ft (83,712.0 m^{2})

Design and construction
- Architecture firm: Hammel, Green & Abrahamson, Inc.

Website
- nelsonworldwide.com/project/two22-tower/

Two22 is a 41-floor tower located on 9th Street and 3rd Avenue in Minneapolis, Minnesota. It is the fifth tallest building in Minneapolis, and Minnesota.

The building was originally named after Piper Jaffray, which subsequently rebranded to Piper Sandler Companies, which used the building as its headquarters when the building opened in 1985. In 2000, after Piper Jaffray was acquired by U.S. Bancorp and moved its headquarters to U.S. Bancorp Center, the building was renamed Campbell Mithun Tower, referencing an advertising and marketing firm that was headquartered in the building that later rebranded itself to Mithun Agency in 2014 and dissolved in 2016. In 2019, the Campbell Mithun Tower changed ownership and was renamed "Two22," styled after the building's street address.

Building amenities include conference facilities, a fitness center, bike storage, underground parking, and on-site management.

Two22 earned Gold-level certification through the Leadership in Energy & Environmental Design (LEED) program, which was developed by the United States Green Building Council (USGBC). The tower was first certified in 2009 then again in 2014.

== Broadcasting ==
=== Television ===
Channel	Callsign	Affiliation	Branding	Subchannels		Owner
(Virtual)	Callsign	Affiliation	Branding	Channel	Programming	Owner
21.1	WUMN-LD	Univision	Univision			Media Vista Group, LLC.

== See also ==
- List of tallest buildings in Minnesota
