= Fifth Street Towers =

Office buildings in Minneapolis, U.S.

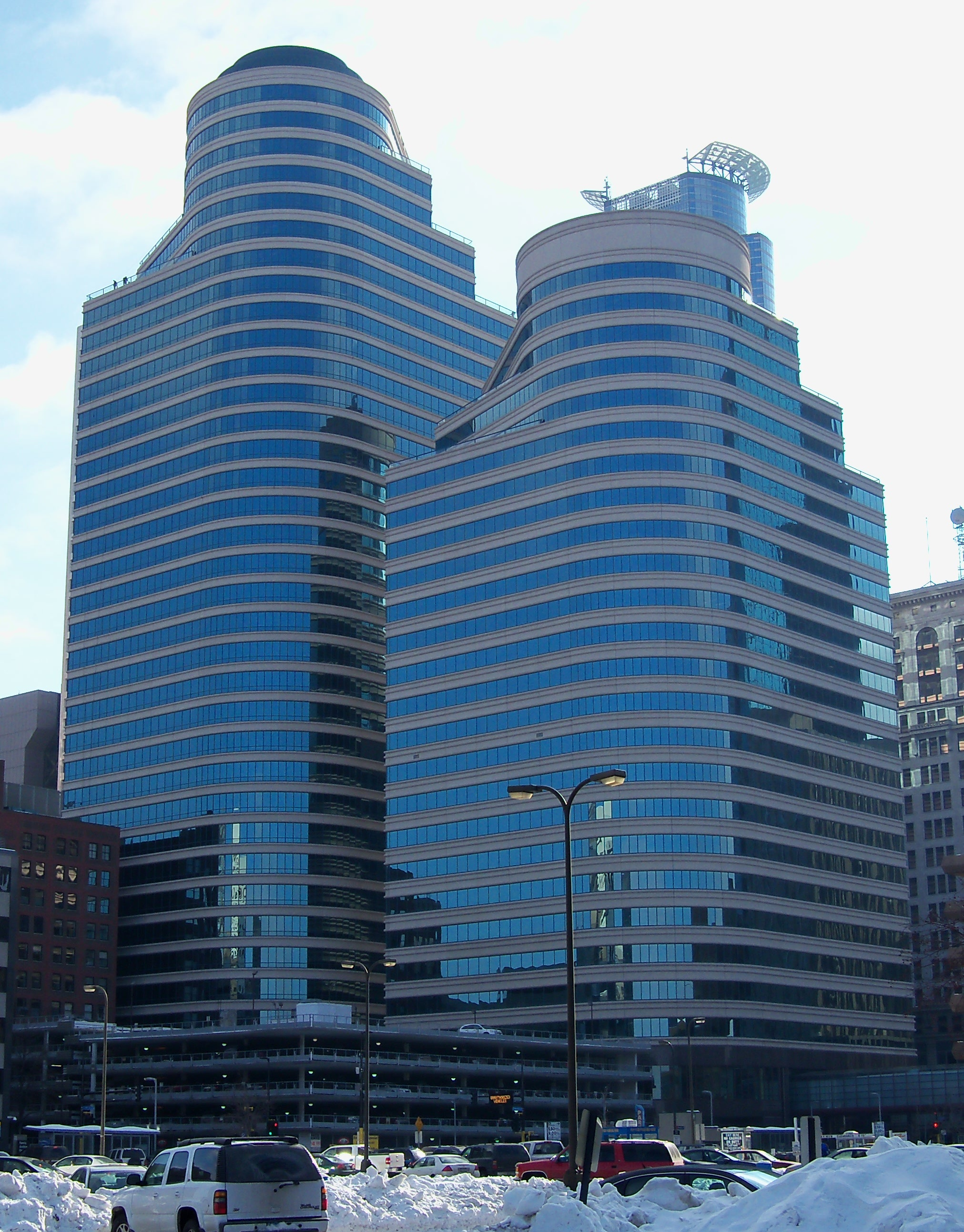
- The complex
- Interactive map of the Fifth Street Towers area

General information
- Coordinates: 44°58′41″N 93°16′6″W
- Completed: 1988; 38 years ago

Height
- Height: Complex: 504 ft (153 m); Tower I: 364 feet (4,370 in); Tower II: 504 feet (6,050 in)

Technical details
- Floor count: Complex: 36; Tower I: 26; Tower II: 36

The Fifth Street Towers is a complex of two buildings in Minneapolis, Minnesota. Fifth Street Towers I was completed in 1987 and is 356 feet (109 m) tall and has 26 floors. Fifth Street Towers II was completed in 1988 and is 504 feet (154 m) tall and has 36 floors.

At one time MAIR Holdings had its headquarters in Suite 1360 of Fifth Street Towers II.

It was purchased in 2007 by a UK-based company, StratREAL for $294 million on behalf of an unnamed client but sold in April 2012 for $110 million following a mortgage default by the borrower. The borrower was Interventure Capital Group, acting on behalf of Prince Abdul Aziz bin Fahd, youngest son of the late King Fahd of Saudi Arabia

== See also ==
- List of tallest buildings in Minneapolis
