= 50 South Sixth =

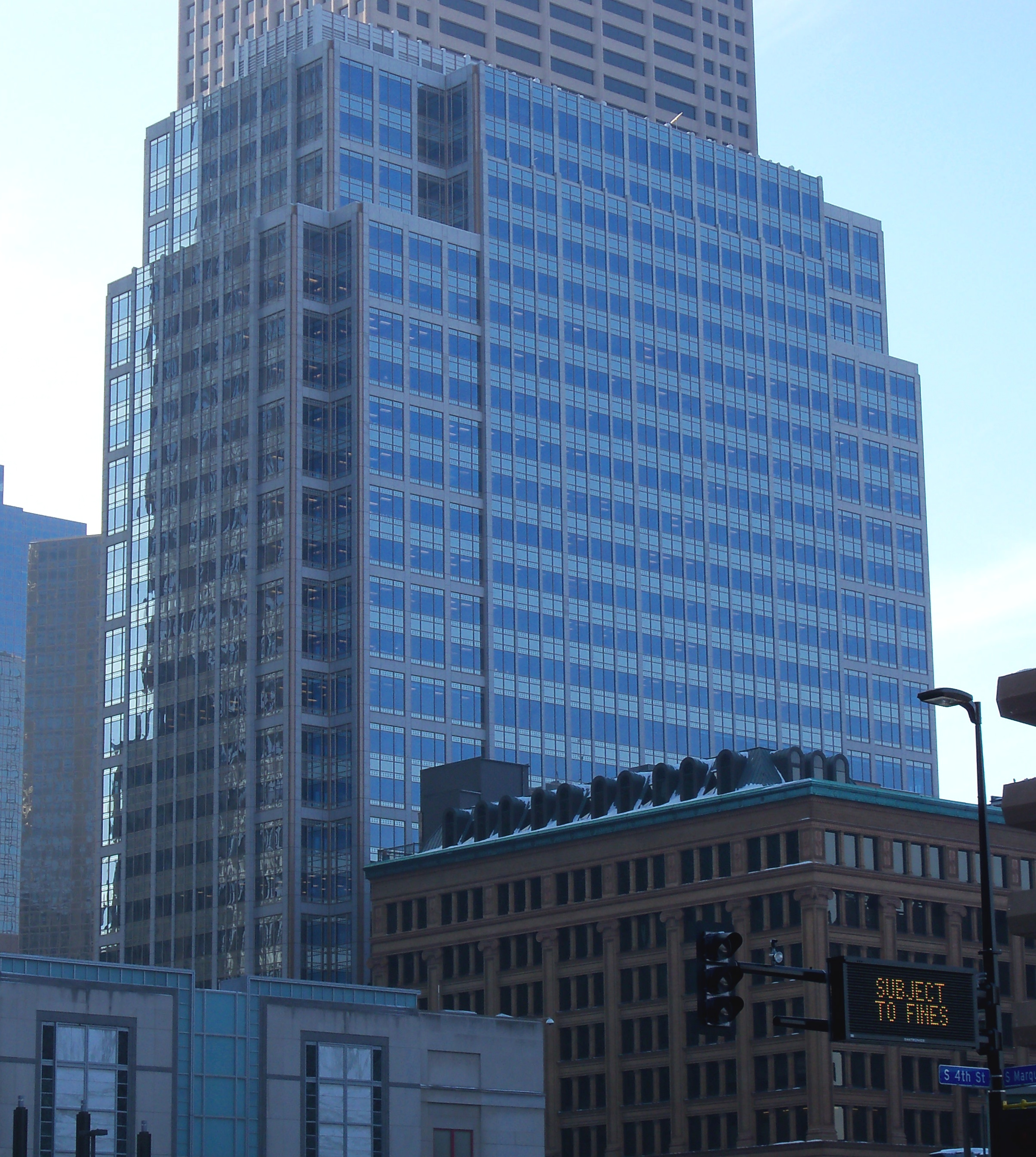
- Interactive map of the 50 South Sixth area
- Alternative names: Dorsey & Whitney Tower

General information
- Type: Class A
- Architectural style: postmodernism
- Location: 50 South 6th St., Minneapolis MN
- Coordinates: 44°58′42″N 93°16′18.5″W
- Current tenants: Dorsey & Whitney, Deloitte
- Construction started: 1999
- Completed: 2001
- Cost: $80,000,000

Height
- Height: 404 ft (123 m)

Technical details
- Floor count: 31

Design and construction
- Architects: Skidmore, Owings & Merrill

50 South Sixth is a 404-ft (123 m) high-rise office building in Minneapolis, Minnesota. It was completed in 2001 and has 30 floors. It is the 18th-tallest building in the city. A skyway connects this building to the 15 Building, Renaissance Square, Minneapolis City Center, and Gaviidae Common. The Minnesota Law Center once occupied this site. The 689,482-square-foot (64,055.0 m^{2}) Class A office tower is managed by Transwestern.

== See also ==
- List of tallest buildings in Minneapolis
