= Northwestern National Life Building =

Building in Minneapolis, Minnesota, U.S.

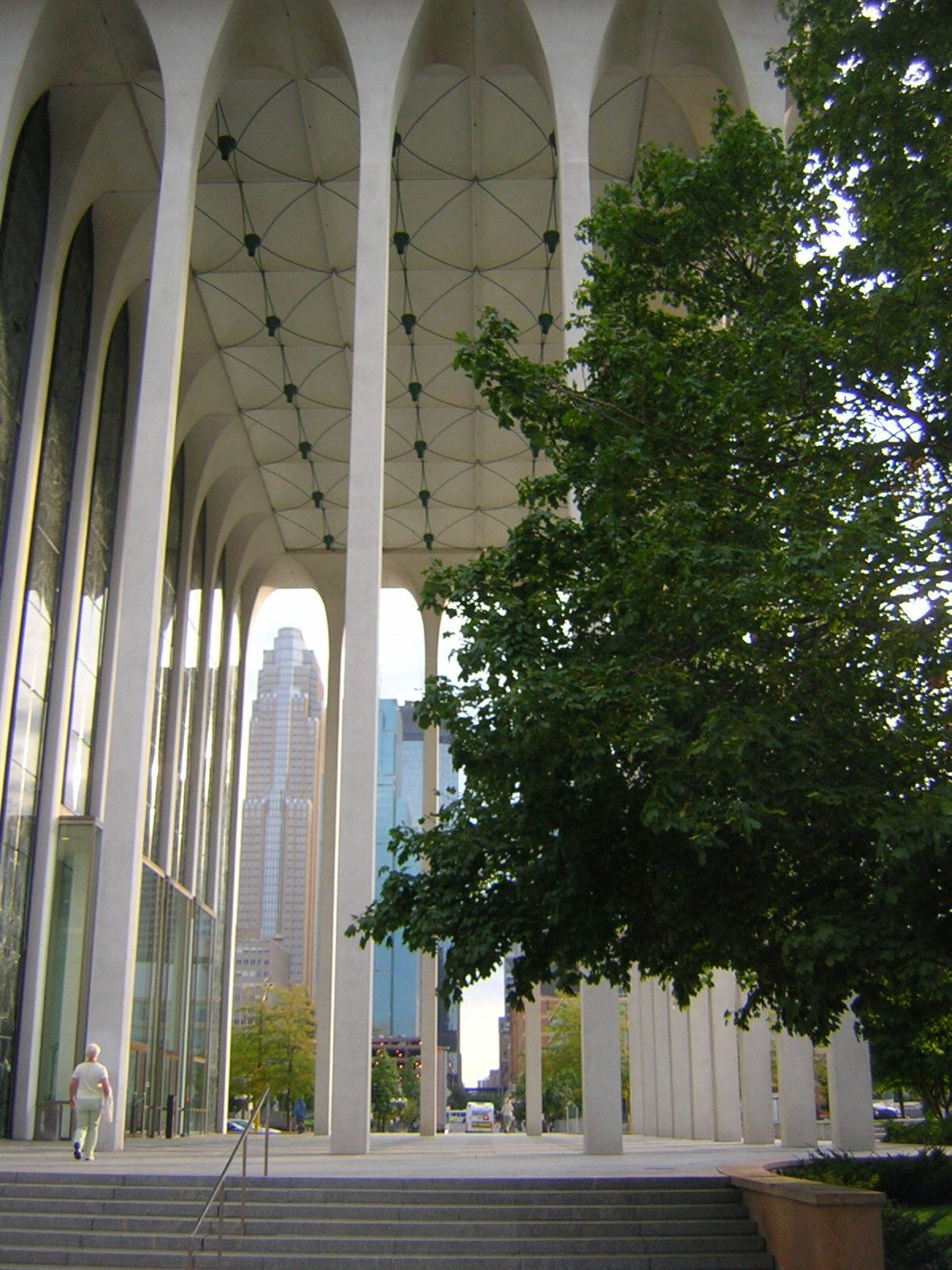
- Northwestern National Life Building portico

General information
- Status: In use
- Type: Office building
- Architectural style: New Formalism
- Location: 20 Washington Avenue South, Minneapolis, Minnesota 55401, United States
- Coordinates: 44°58′54″N 93°16′03″W
- Year built: 1964
- Owner: CDT Realty Corp.

The Northwestern National Life Building, later known as the ReliaStar Building, then ING 20 Washington, then Voya Financial 20 Washington, is an office building located in the Gateway District of Minneapolis. It was designed by Minoru Yamasaki as the headquarters of the Northwestern National Life Insurance Company and was opened in 1965. The building was constructed to replace the Northwestern National Life Insurance Company Home Office near Loring Park, which had become too small for the number of employees in the company.

The building features an 85 foot (26 m) portico that serves as the visual terminus for the Nicollet Mall. Yamasaki said that his design was intended to be "appropriate to an office building, monumental and dignified, yet graceful." The building is framed by about 63 slender quartz-faced concrete columns. He said the porch at the main entrance would be "delicate" and "a delight to walk through". Yamasaki's touches also included reflective pools and landscaping, and he claimed he was designing "a park with a building in it".

Architecture critic Larry Millett calls it, "a temple to the gods of underwriting, built by an insurance company and mixing luxury and high camp in way that, say, Liberace would have appreciated" and "a high point of 1960s modernism in Minneapolis."

The company had 475 employees working in the home office in 1964, when this building opened. In 1978, the company had 850 employees, with some working in nearby offices because the main building had been occupied to capacity. In 1978, Northwestern National Life announced plans to build a 20-story office tower across Marquette Avenue, which became 100 Washington Square. That building was designed to have two-thirds of its space available to rent to other tenants.

In April 2026, developer CDT Realty announced plans to convert the structure into a boutique hotel. The plan includes relocating mechanical equipment from the penthouse to create a pool and patio. The developer hopes to open the hotel in 2028. In November 2026, it was announced that Proper Hospitality will operate the hotel as the Minneapolis Proper Hotel.

== Gallery ==
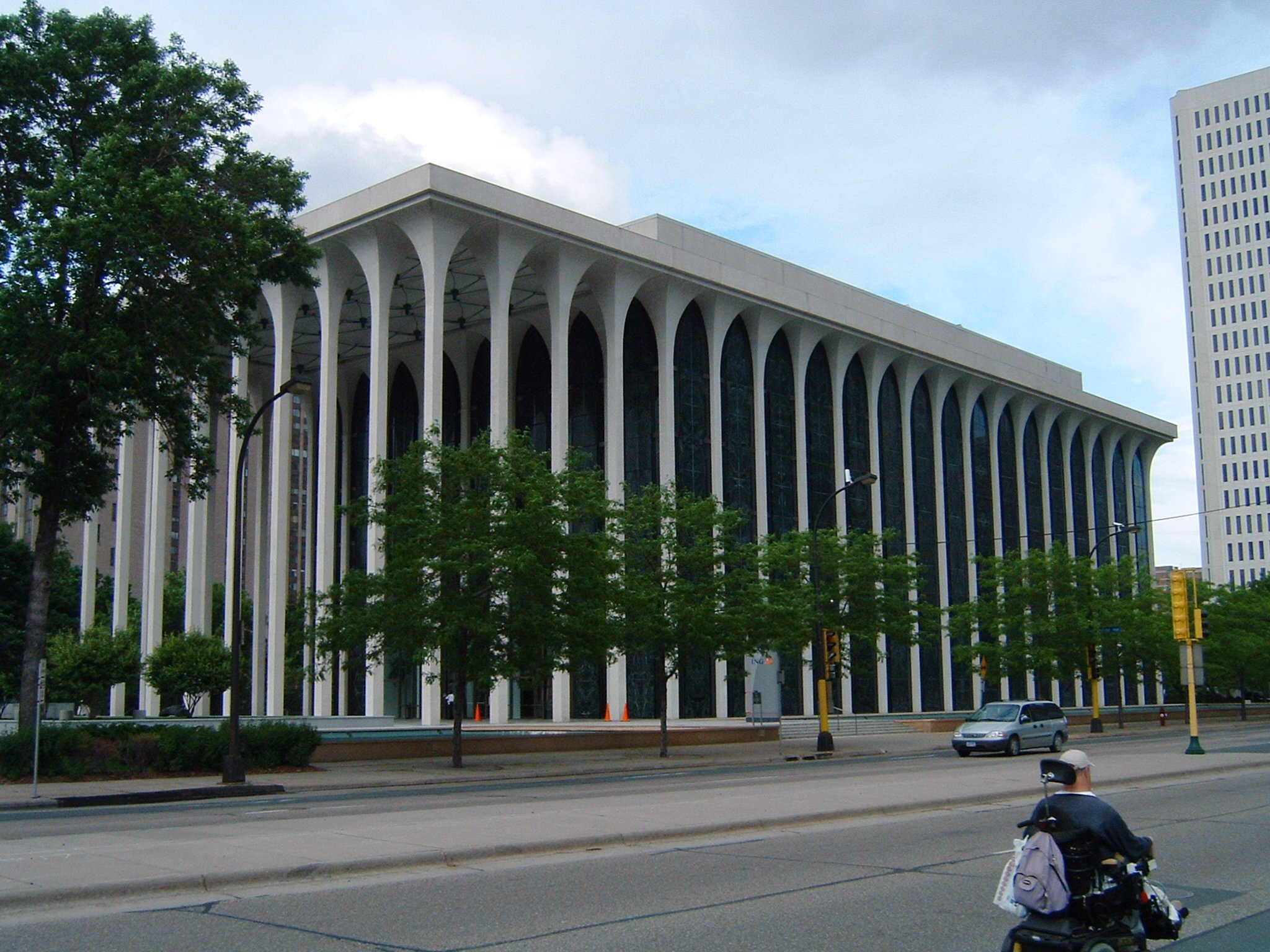
ING Building looking northeast

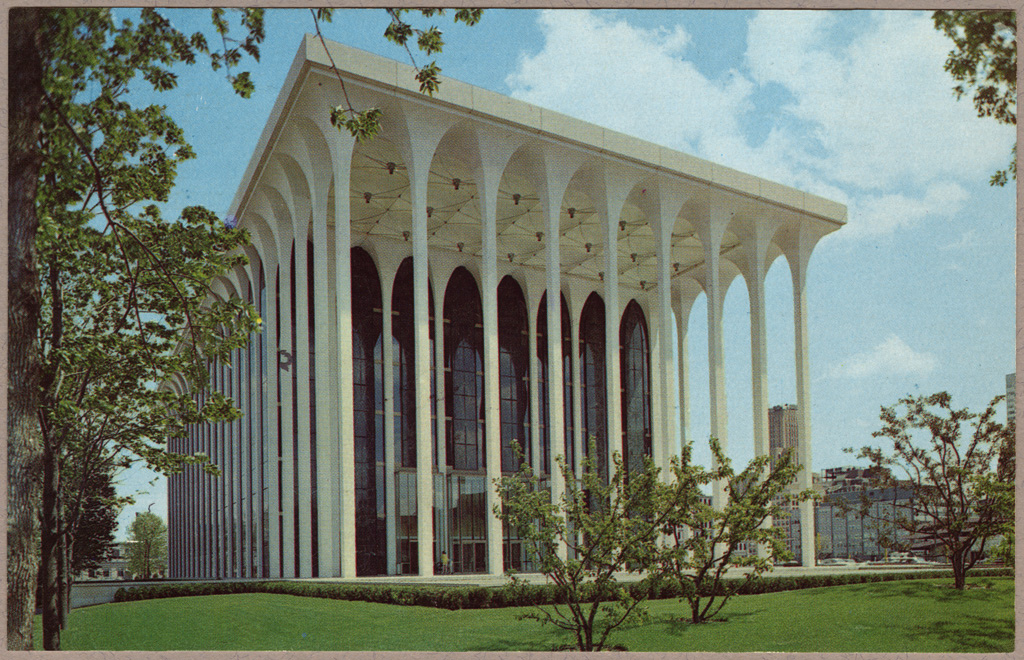
Southwest view

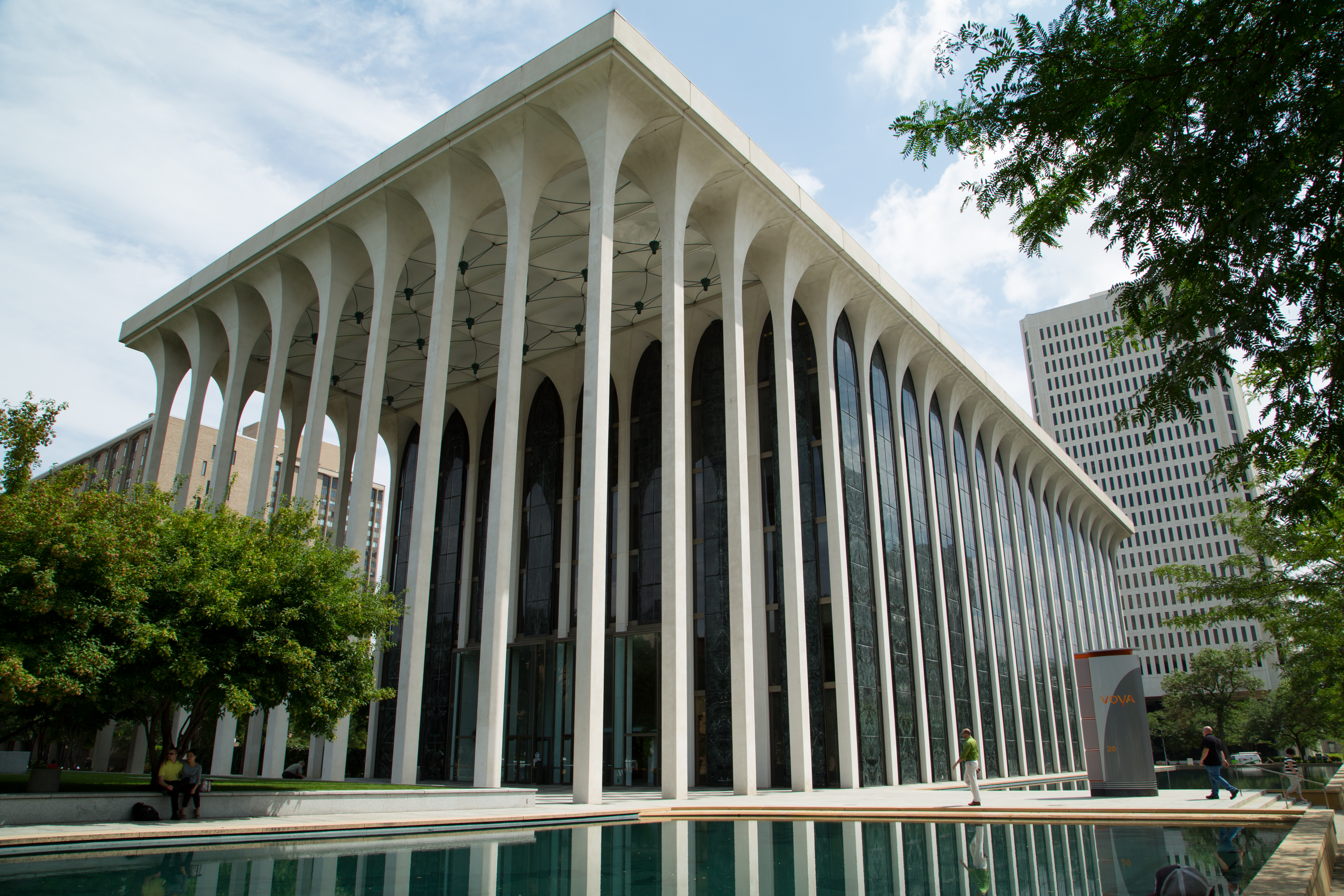
Portico
