= La Rive Condominiums =

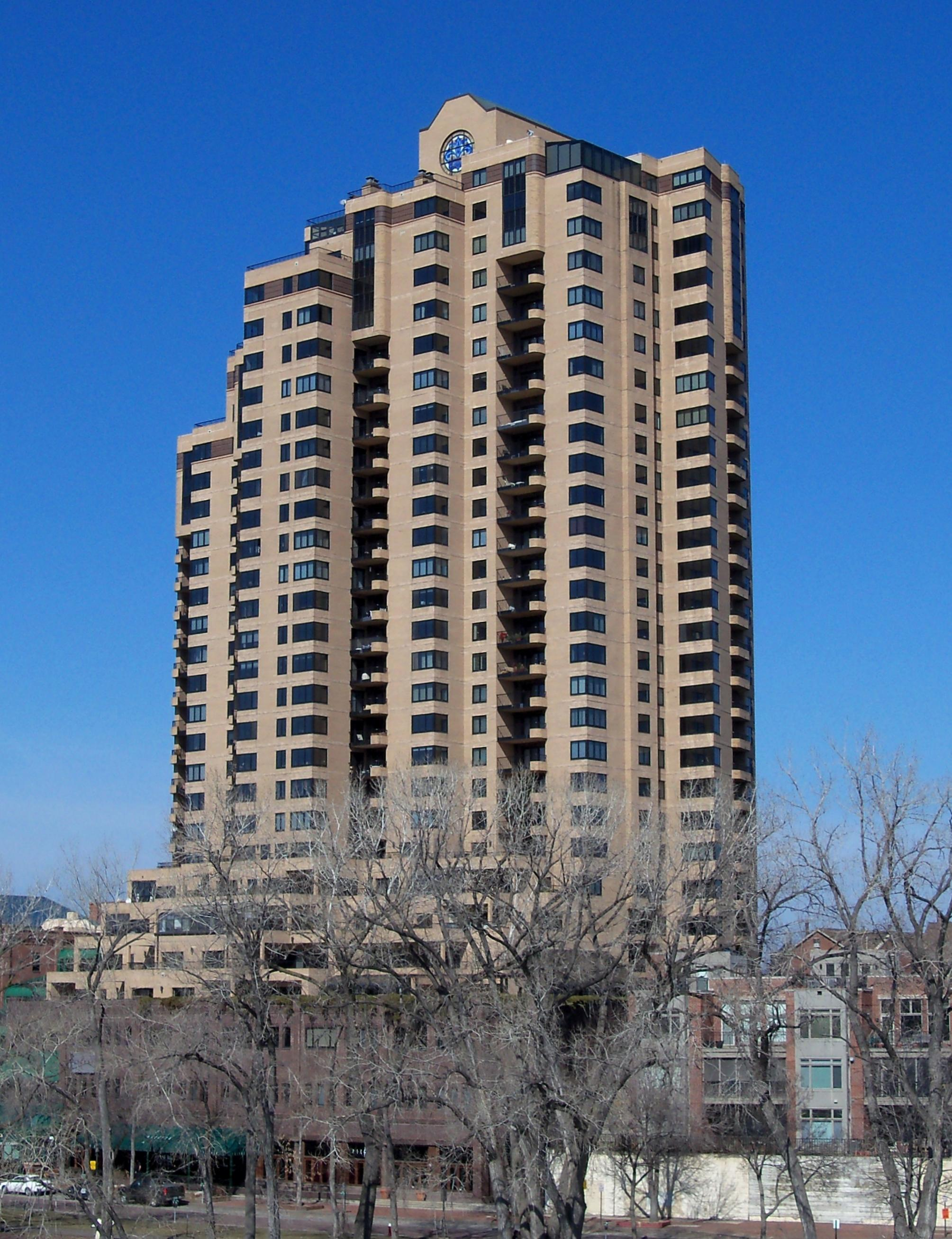
- Interactive map of the La Rive Condominiums area

General information
- Architectural style: Postmodern
- Location: Minneapolis, Minnesota, 110 Bank Street SE
- Coordinates: 44°59′9″N 93°15′27″W
- Construction started: 1984
- Completed: 1987

Height
- Height: 312 ft (95 m)

Technical details
- Floor count: 29

Design and construction
- Architecture firm: Korsunksy, Krank & Erickson
- Main contractor: Bor-Son Construction Company

La Rive Condominiums is a 312-ft (95 m) tall skyscraper in Minneapolis, Minnesota. It was completed in 1987 and has 29 floors. It is the tallest building in the Nicollet Island/East Bank neighborhood of the University Community, and the 31st-tallest building in the city.

== See also ==
- List of tallest buildings in Minneapolis
