= MAIR Holdings =

Airline holding company

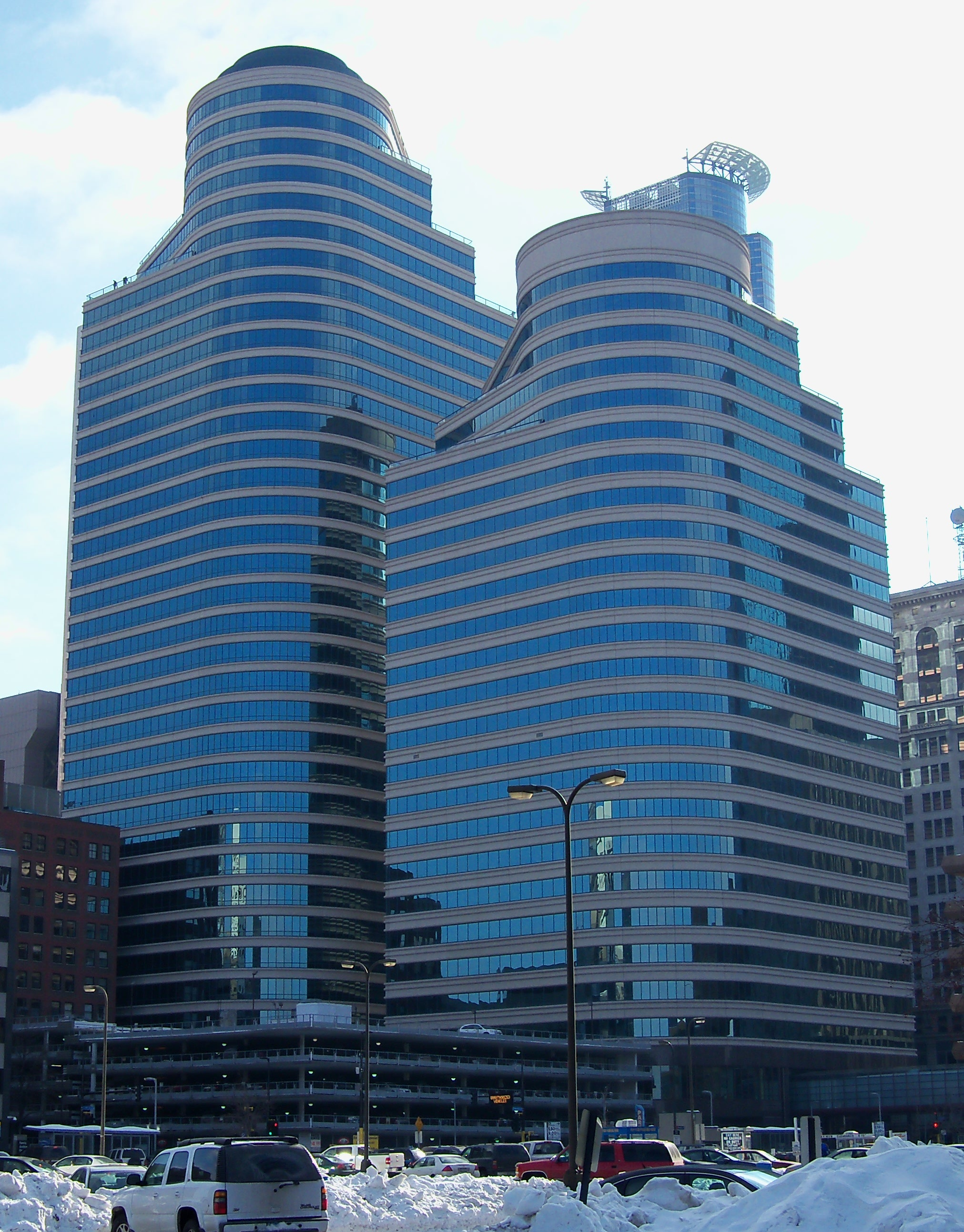
Fifth Street Towers once housed the company headquarters

MAIR Holdings, Inc. (NASDAQ: MAIR) was an airline holding company. Later in its life its headquarters were in Fifth Street Towers II in Downtown Minneapolis, Minnesota. At an earlier time its headquarters were on the property of Minneapolis-St. Paul International Airport and in Fort Snelling, an unincorporated area in Hennepin County. It was established in 1993 as AirTran Corporation and was later renamed to Mesaba Holdings, Inc. The holding company served as the holding company for Mesaba Aviation, Inc., which operated Mesaba Airlines. In 2002, MAIR also acquired Big Sky Transportation, Co., operator of Big Sky Airlines.

Mesaba Airlines, which operated as a Northwest Airlink regional airline, filed for Chapter 11 bankruptcy on October 13, 2005, a result of downsizing occasioned by the earlier bankruptcy of Northwest Airlines. As part of the reorganization of both carriers, Northwest acquired Mesaba on April 24, 2007. This left Big Sky as MAIR's only remaining airline.

Following a series of expansion attempts, Big Sky announced plans to cease operations in December 2007. The airline's last flights were on March 8, 2008.

MAIR's shareholders voted to dissolve the company on June 25, 2008. The company's last day of trading on the NASDAQ was July 7, 2008, and its shares closed at a price of approximately $4.17. Shareholders as of that day received an initial cash distribution from the company of $3 per share in August, 2008, and subsequently received several liquidating distributions as assets were sold and legal issues resolved: 70 cents per share was distributed in November, 2008; 55 cents per share in February, 2009; 12 cents per share in April, 2010; and a final distribution of 2.65 cents per share in July, 2012.
