= SPS Tower =

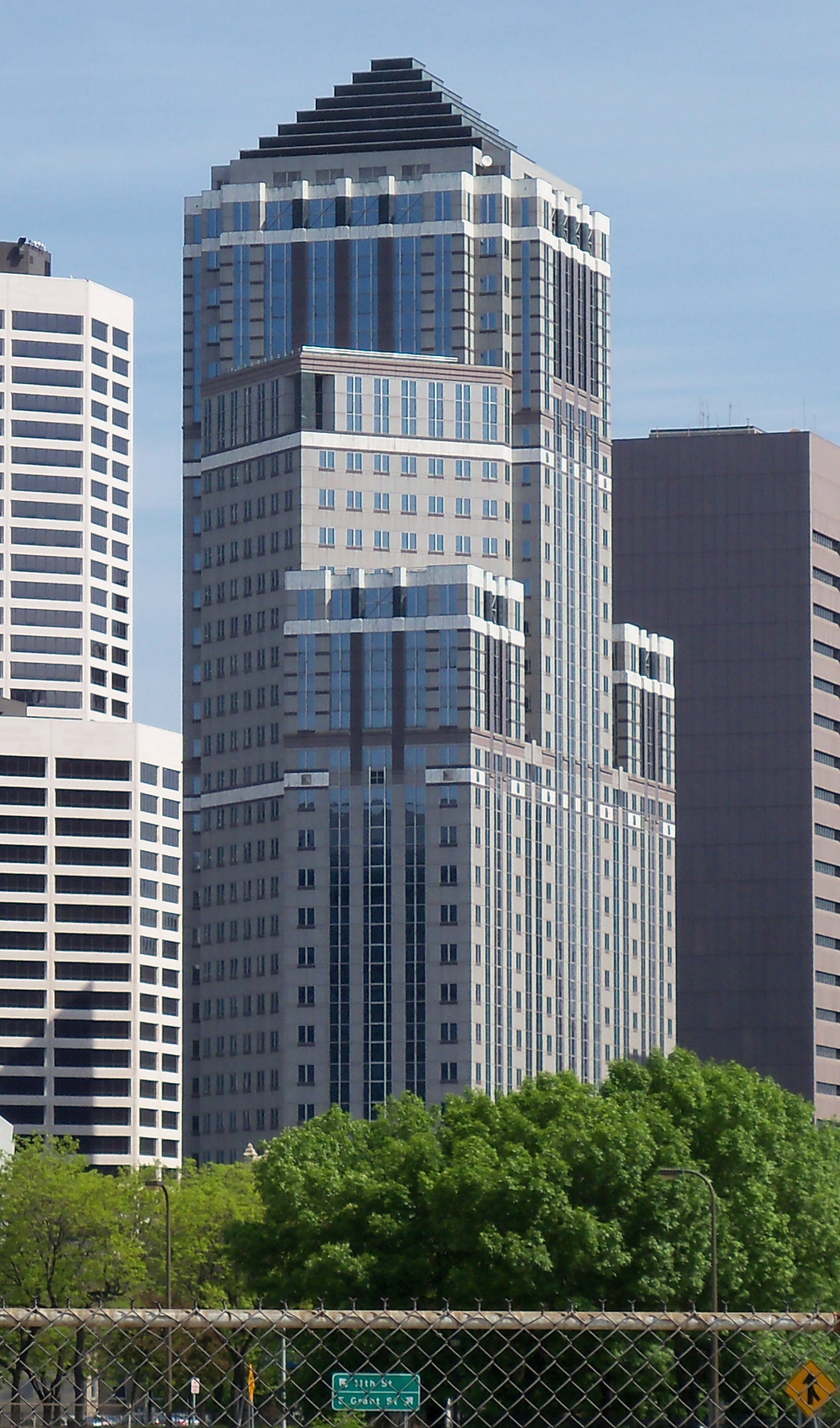
- Interactive map of the SPS Tower area
- Former names: 333 South Seventh Street, Accenture Tower, Andersen Consulting Center, Metropolitan Center, Lincoln Center

General information
- Location: Minneapolis, Minnesota, 333 South 7th Street
- Coordinates: 44°58′27.5″N 93°16′3″W
- Completed: 1987; 39 years ago
- Owner: Sumitomo Corporation of Americas
- Landlord: TransWestern

Height
- Height: 454.494 ft (139 m)

Technical details
- Floor count: 31
- Floor area: 650,000 square feet (60,000 m^{2})

Design and construction
- Architect: Kohn Pendersen Fox Associates

SPS Tower (formerly known as the 333 South Seventh Street) is a 454.494-ft (139 m) tall skyscraper in Minneapolis, Minnesota. It was completed in 1987 and has 31 floors and 650,000 square feet (60,000 m^{2}). It is the 16th-tallest building in the city. It was originally a two-tower project, but only the east tower was built. A small landscaped plaza fronting 3rd Avenue South now occupies the plot for the west tower. The two towers would have had a bow-tie shaped footprint, and shared the same lobby at the center of the site. A skyway connects this building to the 701 Building and the Ameriprise Financial Center. The Senator Hotel was demolished to make way for this building.

== See also ==
- List of tallest buildings in Minneapolis
