= LaSalle Plaza =

Skyscraper in Minneapolis, Minnesota, U.S.

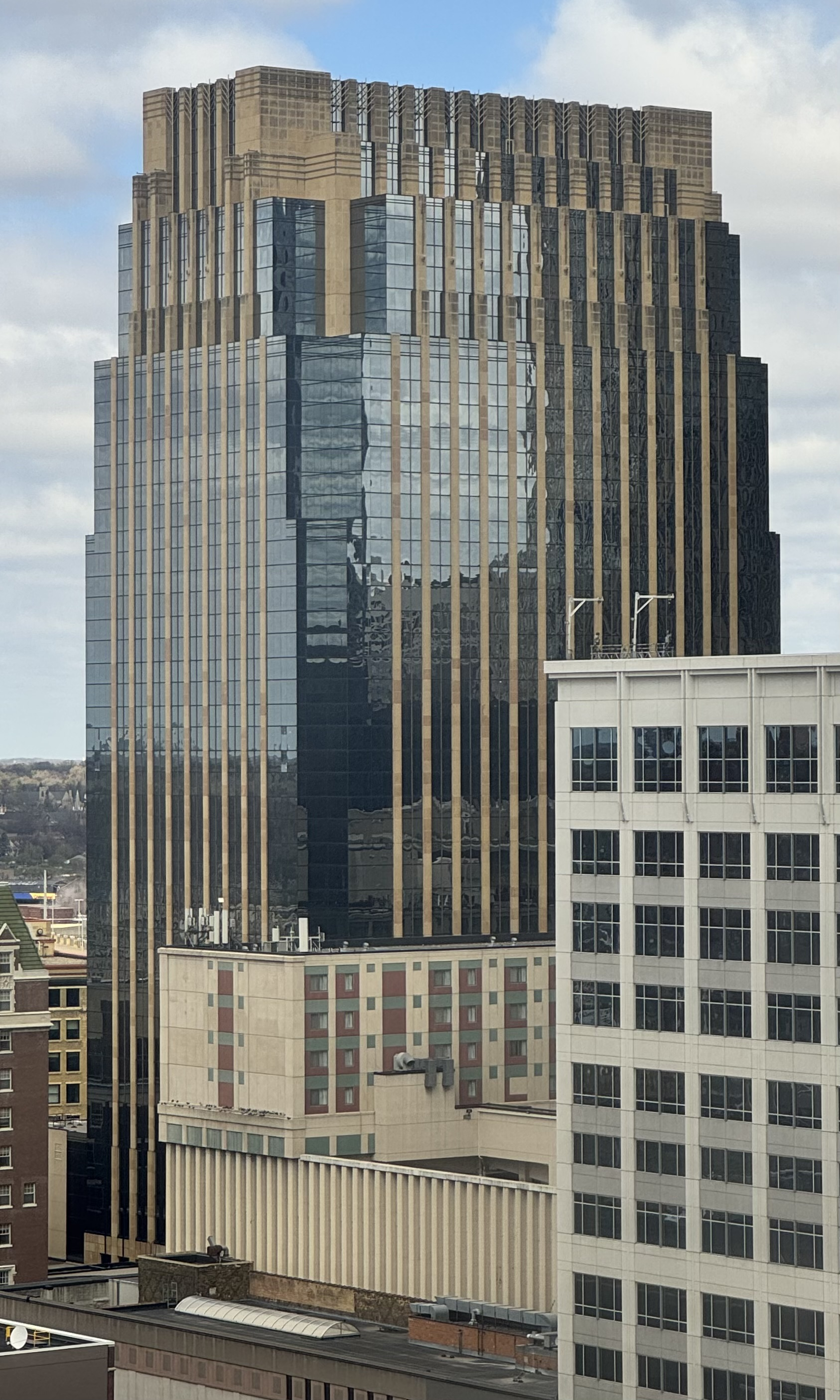
- LaSalle Plaza in 2026

General information
- Type: Mixed Use Office
- Architectural style: Art Deco
- Location: Minneapolis, Minnesota, 800 LaSalle Avenue, Minneapolis, MN 5540
- Coordinates: 44°58′35″N 93°16′30.5″W
- Current tenants: Robins Kaplan LLP, AECOM, CBRE Group, Others
- Completed: 1991
- Owner: Hempel Real Estate

Height
- Height: 387 ft (118 m)

Technical details
- Floor count: 30

Design and construction
- Architect: Ellerbe Becket
- Awards: LEED Gold, BOMA 360 Performance Building

LaSalle Plaza is a Class A skyscraper located in downtown Minneapolis, Minnesota, United States, that is 387 feet (118 m) tall. It is the 20th-tallest building in the city and fills a city block, bound by 8th Street S, LaSalle Avenue, 9th Street S, and Hennepin Avenue. The complex includes a thirty-story office tower and a two-story retail base. It was designed and developed in 1991 around the pre-existing Historic State Theatre.

The building is skyway connected to 811 LaSalle, Residence Inn Downtown Minneapolis/City Center, Target Center, Target Field, the University of St. Thomas, and Target.

== Art ==
The building houses multiple art pieces, including Totem Pole by George Morrison, and Top Hat, a piece by Stanton G. Sears portraying Fred Astaire.

== Tenants ==
LaSalle Plaza is currently leased to multiple small and large tenants. Tenants include:

- AECOM
- The Capital Grille
- CBRE
- Bally Sports North (formerly Fox Sports North) (offices & broadcast studios)
- Robins Kaplan LLP

== See also ==
- List of tallest buildings in Minneapolis
