= Minneapolis Marriott City Center Hotel =

Skyscraper

Minneapolis Marriott City Center
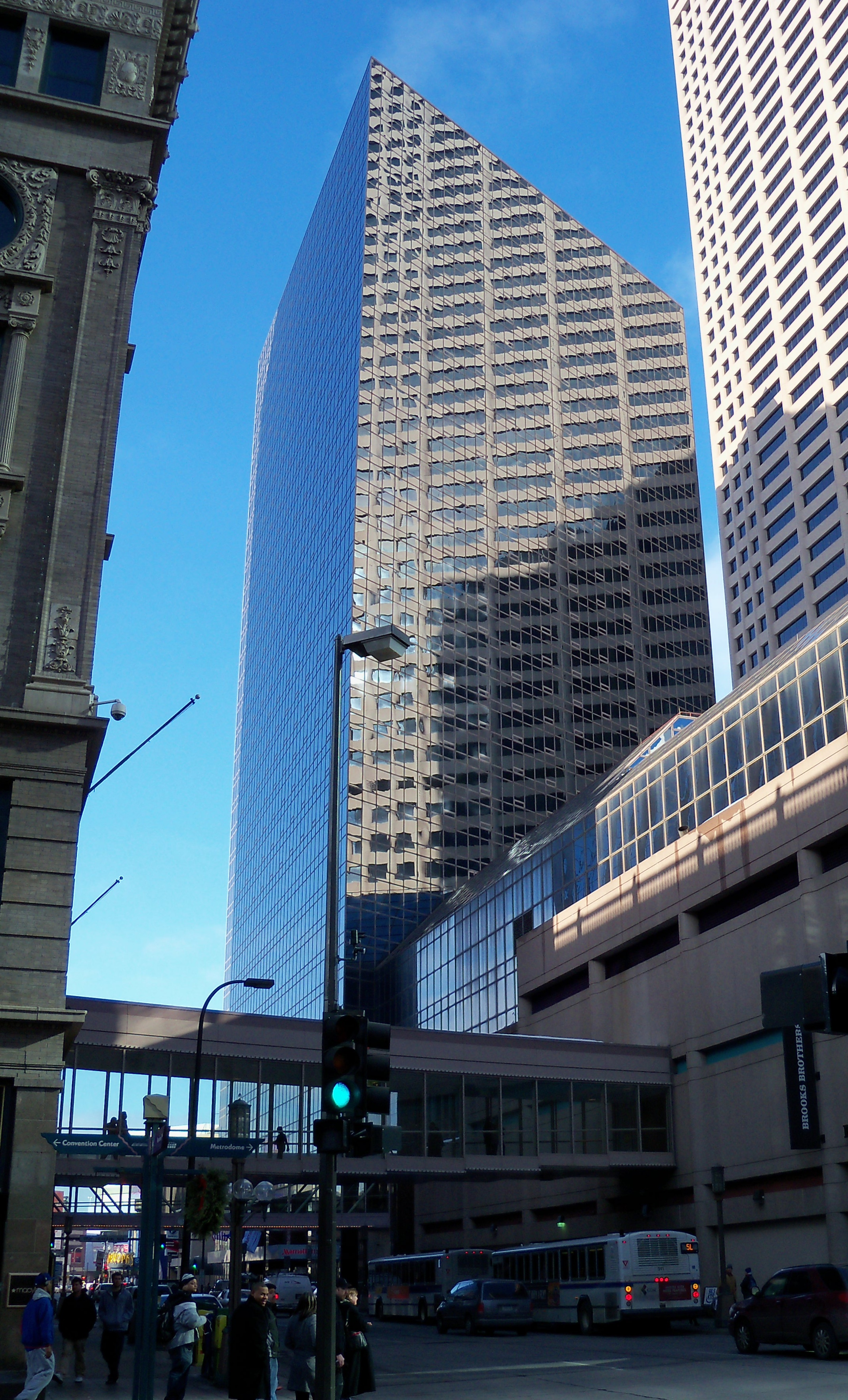
- Interactive map of the Minneapolis Marriott City Center area

General information
- Location: Minneapolis, Minnesota
- Coordinates: 44°58′40″N 93°16′24″W
- Completed: 1983; 43 years ago

Height
- Height: 379 ft (116 m)

Technical details
- Floor count: 32

The Minneapolis Marriott City Center is a 379-ft (116 m) tall 32 floor skyscraper in Minneapolis, Minnesota containing 585 hotel rooms. The building has a triangular shape, with the westernmost corner a knife's edge. It is the tallest hotel on the list of tallest buildings in Minneapolis.

== History ==
The building was completed in 1983 as the Amfac Hotel Minneapolis City Center.

On November 13, 2005, wrestler Eddie Guerrero died here in his hotel room of acute heart failure.

In 2012, the ground lease on the building was sold by Brookfield Properties to Shorenstein Properties.

The hotel was renovated in 2020.
