= U.S. Bank Plaza (Minneapolis) =

US Bank Plaza
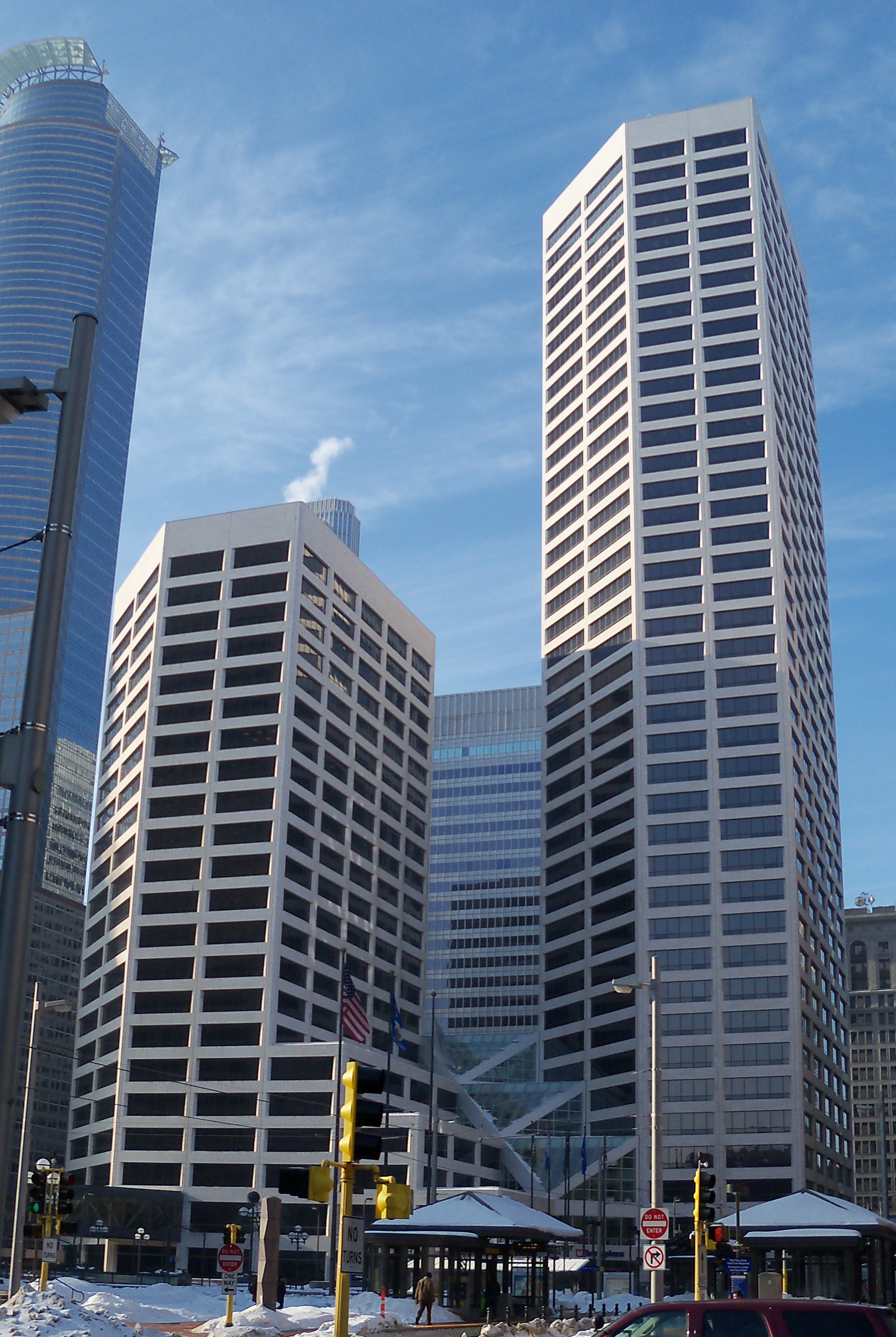
- Interactive map of the US Bank Plaza area
- Former names: Pillsbury Center

General information
- Location: Minneapolis, Minnesota, 200 South 6th St.
- Coordinates: 44°58′38″N 93°16′4″W
- Current tenants: Fredrikson & Byron; U. S. Bank; CliftonLarsonAllen; Grant Thorton; Henson & Efron
- Completed: 1981; 45 years ago

Height
- Height: Complex: 561 feet (171 m); US Bank Plaza I: 561 feet (6,730 in); US Bank Plaza: 321 feet (3,850 in)

Design and construction
- Architecture firm: Skidmore, Owings & Merrill

The US Bank Plaza is a two-tower high-rise building complex in Minneapolis, Minnesota. US Bank Plaza I is a 561-foot (171 m) tall, 40-floor skyscraper. US Bank Plaza II is a 321-foot (98 m) tall, 23-floor skyscraper. Originally called Pillsbury Center, the complex was completed in 1981. The complex has a 500 car parking garage below and is connected by skyway to the Capella Tower, Hennepin County Government Center, Canadian Pacific Plaza, and the McKnight Building. Tower I served as the corporate headquarters of the Pillsbury Company from its 1981 completion until Pillsbury's acquisition by General Mills in 2001. The name of the building was changed to US Bank Plaza in 2004. The towers are clad in travertine marble and have bronze-tinted reflective windows.

== See also ==
- List of tallest buildings in Minneapolis
