= Churchill Apartments =

Apartment building in downtown Minneapolis, MN

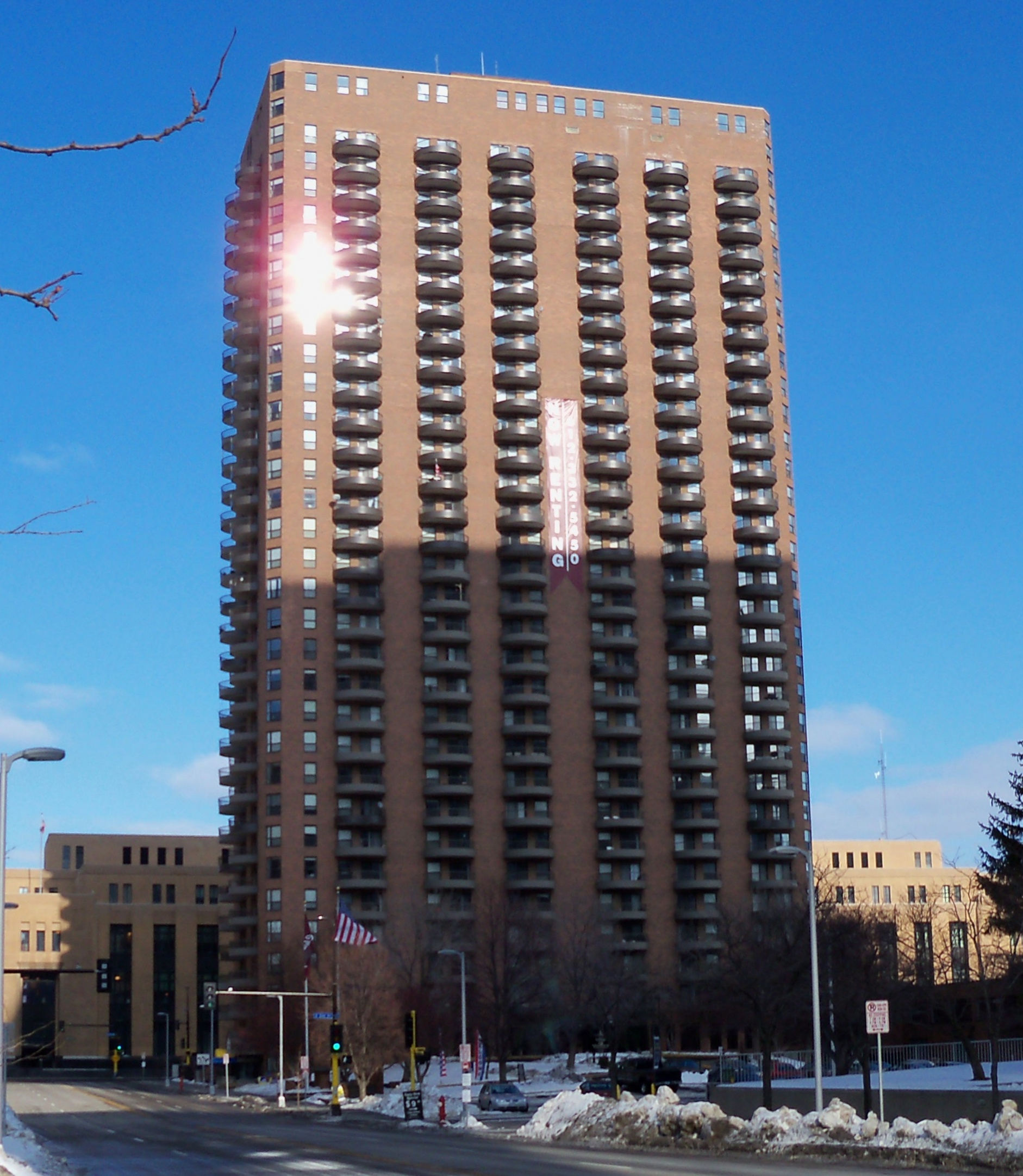
- Interactive map of the Churchill Apartments area

General information
- Location: Minneapolis, Minnesota
- Coordinates: 44°58′57.5″N 93°15′54″W
- Completed: 1980-81

Height
- Height: 310 ft (95 m)

Technical details
- Floor count: 33

Design and construction
- Architect: John Black
- Architecture firm: Dubin, Dubin, Black & Moutoussamy
- Main contractor: McColl-Tribco

Churchill Apartments is a 310-ft (95 m) skyscraper in Minneapolis, Minnesota. It was built in 1981 and has 33 floors. It is the 38th-tallest building in the city.

The opening scene of the movie Young Adult was filmed in various units of the building.

== See also ==
- List of tallest buildings in Minneapolis
