= Canadian Pacific Plaza =

Skyscraper in Minneapolis, Minnesota, US

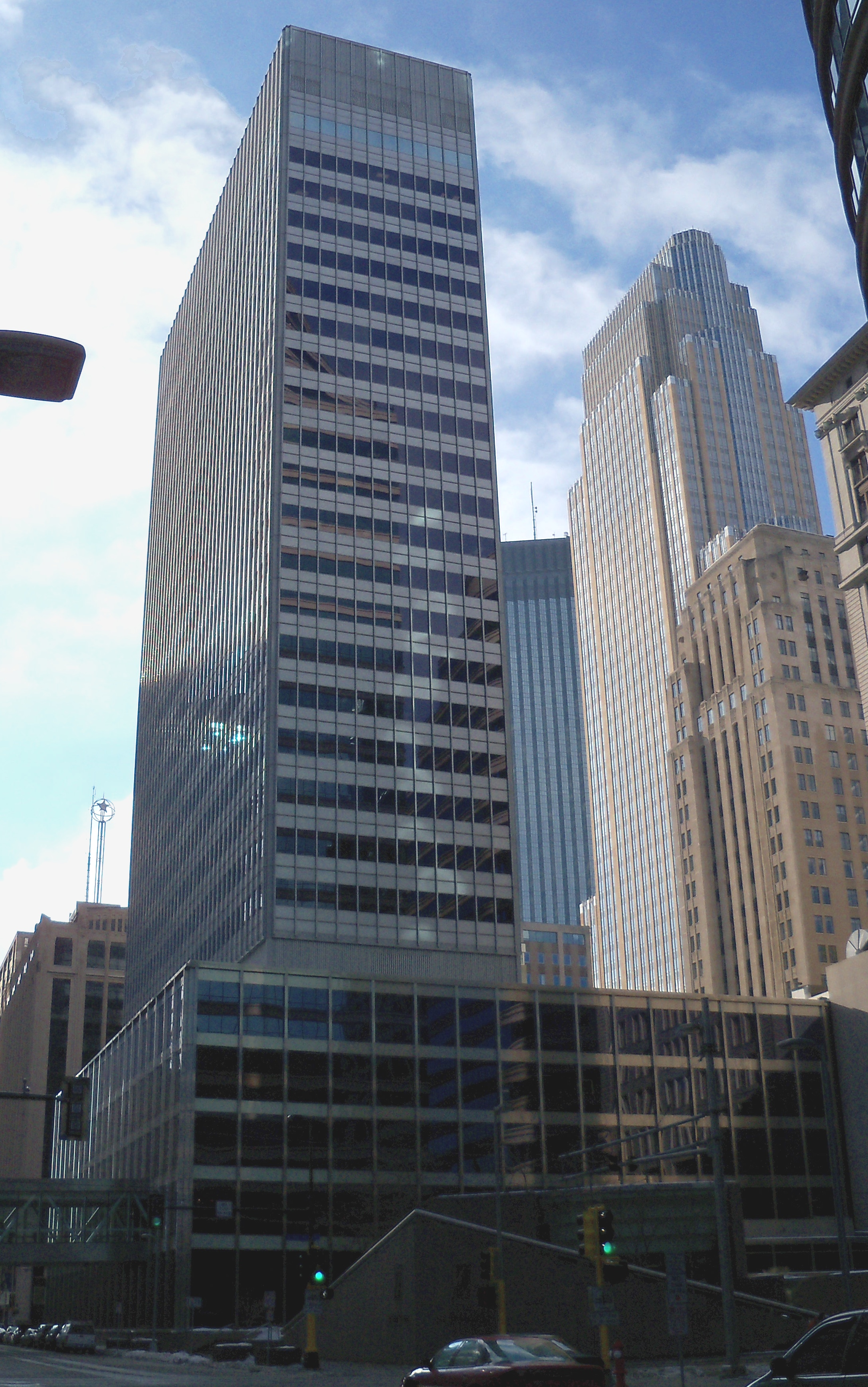
- Canadian Pacific Plaza in 2010

General information
- Location: 120 South Sixth Street; Minneapolis, Minnesota
- Coordinates: 44°58′38″N 93°16′7″W
- Completed: 1960

Height
- Height: 383 ft (117 m)

Technical details
- Floor count: 28

Design and construction
- Architecture firm: Holabird, Root & Burgee with Thorshov & Cerny

Canadian Pacific Plaza is a 383-ft (117 m) tall skyscraper in Minneapolis, Minnesota. It was completed in 1960 and has 28 floors. It is the 21st-tallest building in the city. It is the first major post-World War II skyscraper built in Minneapolis. It is also the city's tallest building completed in the 1960s. A skyway connects the building to the Rand Tower, Soo Line Building, and US Bank Plaza.

The building's history began in 1955 when First Bank System of Minneapolis hired Holabird, Root & Burgee of Chicago to design a new headquarters. The project, assisted by Minneapolis firm Thorshov & Cerny, drew inspiration from the design principles of Ludwig Mies van der Rohe and the recently completed Lever House in New York City. Construction commenced with demolition of the New York Life Insurance Building in 1957, followed by a January groundbreaking in 1958, and final occupancy in May of 1960.

The building was known for its first 20 years as First National Bank Building. It served as the headquarters for First Bank System (now U.S. Bancorp) and its subsidiary First National Bank of Minneapolis (now U.S. Bank). In 1980, after the bank developed Pillsbury Center, whose shorter tower was styled First Bank Place East, the First National Bank Building was renamed First Bank Place West. First Bank System and First Bank, N.A. moved to the Capella Tower in 1992. The building subsequently took on the name One Financial Plaza. In August 2012, the building gained its current moniker when Canadian Pacific Railway moved its United States headquarters and 400 employees out of the nearby Soo Line Building, which was undergoing conversion into a residential building. The Soo Line Building is the namesake of the historic Soo Line Railroad, of which the Canadian Pacific become majority shareholder in 1890 and took full control in 1990, moving its own US headquarters into the former Soo Line offices.

== See also ==
- List of tallest buildings in Minneapolis
