= RBC Gateway =

Mixed-use skyscraper in Minneapolis

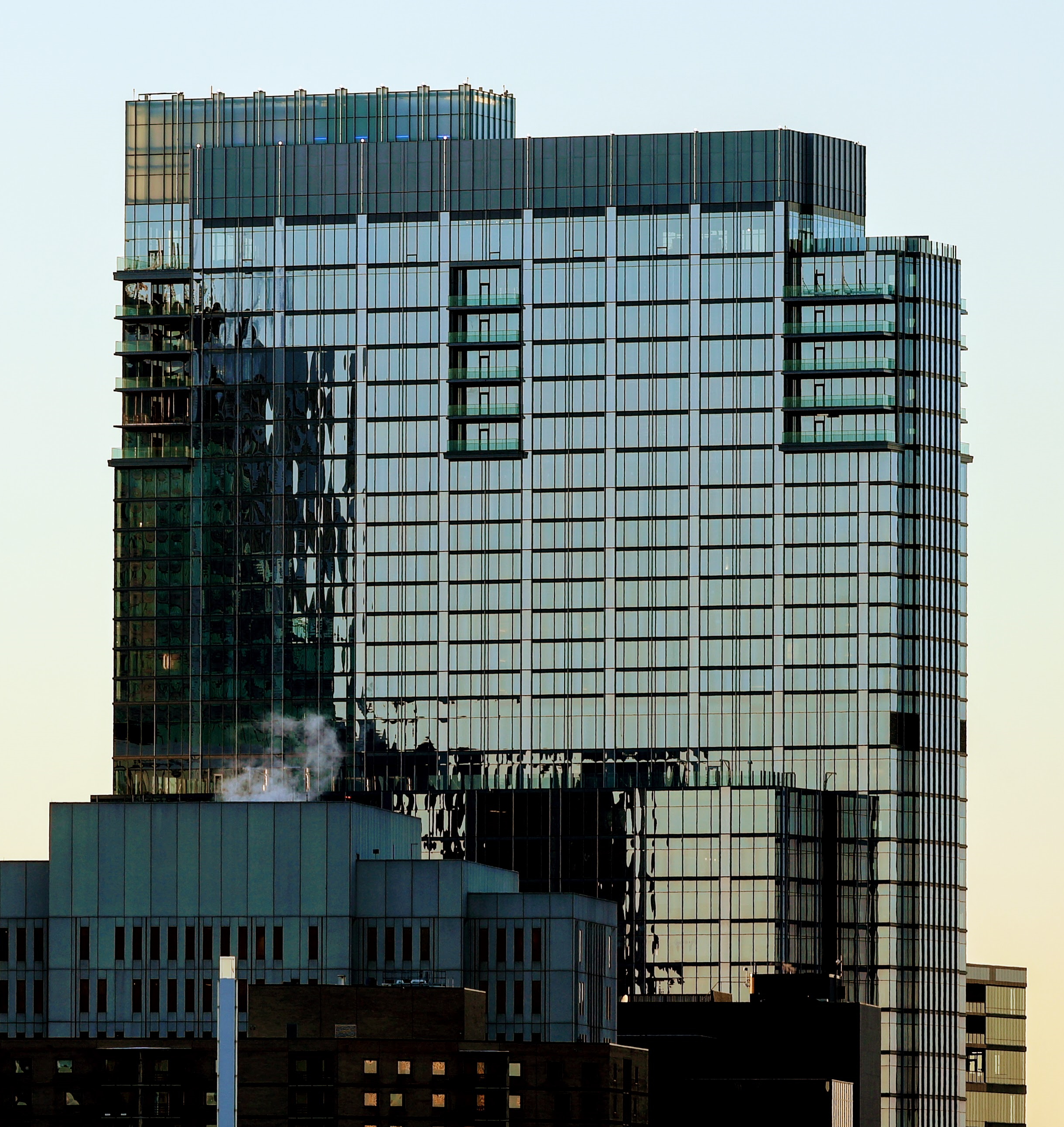
- Interactive map of the RBC Gateway area

General information
- Status: Completed
- Location: 250 Nicollet Mall
- Coordinates: 44°58′53″N 93°16′09″W
- Construction started: 2019
- Completed: 2022

Height
- Height: 519 ft (158 m)

Technical details
- Floor count: 37

Design and construction
- Architects: Smallwood, Reynolds, Stewart, Stewart & Associates, Inc.
- Developer: United Properties
- Main contractor: McGough

RBC Gateway is a 37-story, 519-foot-tall (158 m) mixed-use skyscraper in Minneapolis, Minnesota. The building contains 34 luxury condominium units, a 222-room Four Seasons hotel, and 530,000 square feet of office space.

== History ==
RBC Gateway was initially proposed in 2015 by United Properties as part of a public competition to redevelop a surface parking lot in downtown Minneapolis and called for a 300-room Hilton hotel and office space. The building was the first Class A office building constructed in the city since 2001. In June 2019, the developer announced that plans for the tower would be revised to instead incorporate a 222-room Four Seasons hotel and 34 luxury condo units rather than the originally slated Hilton. RBC Gateway held a ceremonial groundbreaking on June 19, 2019, with expected completion in 2022.

In July 2023, San Francisco investment firm Spear Capital acquired the 16 floors of office space in RBC Gateway from United Properties for $225 million. The sale did not include the hotel or condo floors of the tower.

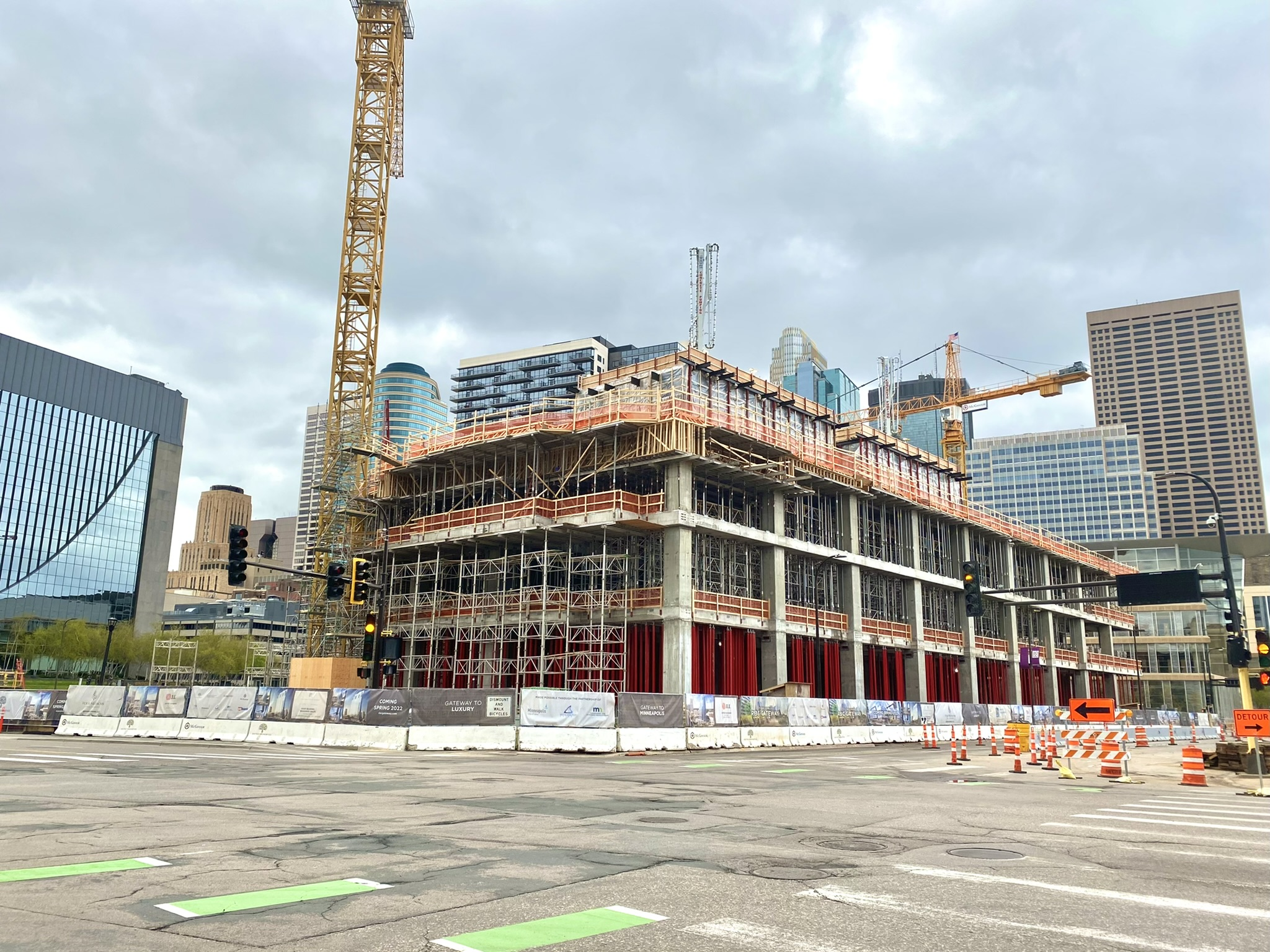
RBC Gateway building under construction in 2020.

== Construction ==
Construction on RBC Gateway began in June 2019 and was completed in 2022. The general contractor for the project was Minneapolis-based McGough Construction and it was designed by Smallwood, Reynolds, Stewart, Stewart & Associates, Incorporated. By completion, construction costs topped $650 million, while interior finishes put the final total cost above $1 billion.

== See also ==
- List of tallest buildings in Minneapolis
