= Target Plaza South =

Skyscraper in Minnesota

Target Plaza
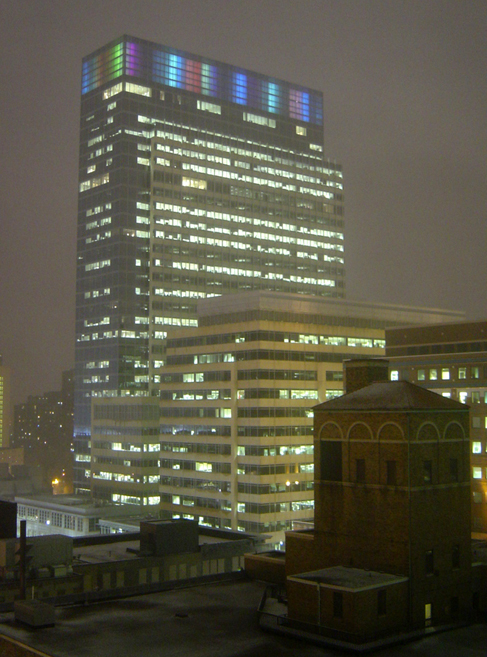
- The lights of Target Plaza South at night.

General information
- Location: 900 Nicollett Mall; Minneapolis, Minnesota 55403
- Coordinates: 44°58′25″N 93°16′34″W
- Current tenants: Target Corporation
- Construction started: 1999; 27 years ago
- Completed: 2001; 25 years ago

Technical details
- Floor count: 33

Target Plaza South is a 33-story skyscraper in downtown Minneapolis, Minnesota, completed in 2001. The building serves as the corporate headquarters for Target Corporation. It is located a few blocks away from the original building which the Target Corporation's predecessor, Dayton's, was located in from 1902 until 2001.

== Description ==
The building was designed by architects Ellerbe Becket of Minneapolis and was completed in 2001. It is connected via an eighth-floor walkway to the 14-story Target Plaza North and contains retail space on the street level with three levels of parking below ground. The building is notable for the colorful 3M-designed lighting display in its upper floors, which change frequently to present a unique light show that is visible in the Minneapolis skyline at night.

== Arson attempt ==
In August of 2020, during the false rumors riot, the building was broken into by rioters, who set fire to a counter in the mailroom and attempted to start a second fire near the building's entrance. The perpetrators, Shador T.C. Jackson, Victor D. Edwards, and Leroy L.P. Williams were indicted on arson charges in December of 2020.
