= 707 2nd Avenue South =

Skyscraper in Minneapolis, Minnesota

707 2nd Avenue West
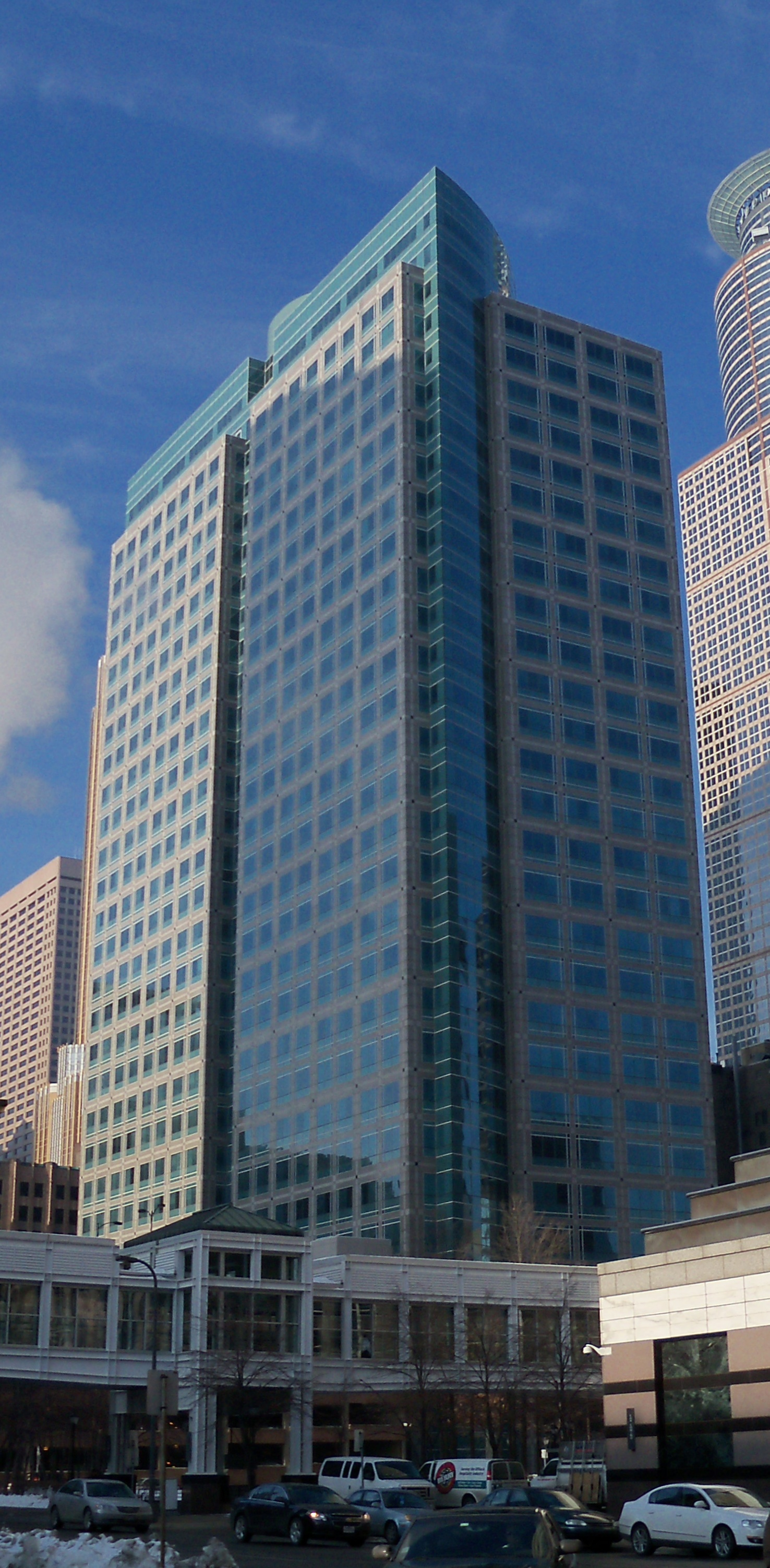
- Interactive map of the 707 2nd Avenue West area
- Former names: Ameriprise Financial Center

General information
- Location: Minneapolis, Minnesota, 707 2nd Avenue South
- Coordinates: 44°58′31″N 93°16′8.5″W
- Construction started: 1997
- Completed: 2000

Height
- Height: 498 ft (152 m)

Technical details
- Floor count: 31
- Floor area: 1,000,000 sq ft (93,000 m^{2})

Design and construction
- Architecture firm: HKS, Inc.

707 2nd Avenue South (formerly known as Ameriprise Financial Center) is a 498-foot-tall skyscraper (152 m) in Minneapolis, Minnesota located at 707 2nd Avenue South. It was completed in 2000 and has 31 floors. It is the tallest building completed in the US in 2000.

This building is the largest single-tenant skyscraper in downtown Minneapolis. The headquarters of Ameriprise Financial (formerly American Express Financial Advisors) moved here from the IDS Tower in April 2000. A skyway connects the building to the Capella Tower, Baker Center, and Accenture Tower. A mixture of glass and granite on units, usually 5 feet wide by 15 feet tall (1.5 by 4.6 m), is used on the wall. Unitized aluminum framing, glass and granite were also used on the building. It sits on the site of the old Lutheran Brotherhood Building, which was demolished to make way for this building. The building was purchased in September 2016 by Morning Calm Management, a commercial real estate management firm from West Palm Beach, Florida, at a price of $220M. In January 2025, the building was purchased by Minnetonka, Minnesota based Onward Investors at a price of $6.25M.

In late 2025, the company will be moving its headquarters to 901 3rd Avenue South because the lease for 707 2nd Avenue South was going to be expired in October of 2025.

== See also ==
- List of tallest buildings in Minneapolis
