= List of tallest buildings in Minnesota =

This list of tallest buildings in Minnesota ranks skyscrapers in the state of Minnesota by tallest height of high rise. This does not include antennas, although the tallest overall man-made structure in Minnesota is the KPXM-TV Tower in Big Lake. It is also the 212th tallest structure in the United States. The majority of the tallest buildings in Minnesota are in Minneapolis, the largest city in the state by population. Other cities that have some of the state's tallest buildings include the state capital of St. Paul (14), South St. Paul (1), Rochester (11), Golden Valley (4), St. Louis Park (7), Plymouth (1), Duluth (6), Brooklyn Center (1), St. Cloud (2), Edina (9), Alexandria (1), Maplewood (1), Robbinsdale (1), Eden Prairie (4), Moorhead (2), Richfield (4), Eagan (2), and Bloomington (15). Not all buildings in Minneapolis and St. Paul are listed, due to the large number of skyscrapers and high rises in both cities.

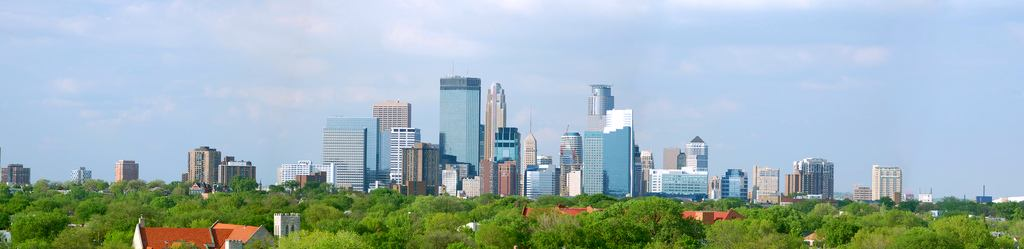
Panorama of the Minneapolis skyline in 2007

== List ==
Rank	Name	Image	Height feet / meters	Floors (Stories)	Year Completed	Type	City	Notes
1	IDS Center		792 / 241	57	1973	Office	Minneapolis	Tallest Building in Minnesota; 912 feet / 278 meters Tall with antenna
2	Capella Tower		776 / 237	56	1992	Office	Minneapolis	
3	Wells Fargo Center		775 / 236	57	1988	Office	Minneapolis	
4	33 South Sixth		668 / 204	52	1982	Office	Minneapolis	
5	Two22		579 / 177	42	1985	Office	Minneapolis	
6	US Bank Plaza I		561 / 171	41	1981	Office/Retail	Minneapolis	
7	Eleven	A tall, white building	550 / 168	43	2022	Residential	Minneapolis	Tallest residential building in Minnesota
8	RBC Plaza		539 / 164	40	1992	Office/Retail	Minneapolis	
9	RBC Gateway		516 / 157	38	2022	Mixed Use	Minneapolis	
10	Fifth Street Towers II		504 / 153	36	1988	Office	Minneapolis	
11	Ameriprise Financial Center		498 / 152	31	2000	Office	Minneapolis	
12	Target Plaza South		492 / 150	33	2001	Office	Minneapolis	
13	Plaza VII		475 / 145	36	1987	Mixed Use	Minneapolis	
14	Wells Fargo Place		472 / 144	37	1987	Office	St. Paul	Tallest building in St. Paul
15	The Carlyle		469 / 143	41	2007	Residential	Minneapolis	
16	US Bancorp Center		467 / 142	32	2000	Office	Minneapolis	
17	AT&T Tower		464 / 141	34	1991	Office	Minneapolis	
18	SPS Tower		455 / 139	33	1987	Office	Minneapolis	
19	Foshay Tower		448 / 137	32	1929	Hotel	Minneapolis	
20	Cray Plaza (Jackson Tower)		443 / 135	46	1986	Mixed Use	St. Paul	
21	First National Bank Building		417 / 127	32	1931	Office	St. Paul	
22	CenturyLink Building		416 / 127	26	1932	Telecommunications	Minneapolis	
23	Fifty South Sixth		404 / 123	30	2001	Office	Minneapolis	
24	Hennepin County Government Center		403 / 123	24	1977	Government	Minneapolis	
25	LaSalle Plaza		386 / 118	28	1991	Office	Minneapolis	
26	Canadian Pacific Plaza		383 / 117	28	1960	Office	Minneapolis	
27	8500 Tower		381 / 116	24	1988	Office	Bloomington	Tallest building outside of Minneapolis and St. Paul
28	Marriott Hotel City Center		379 / 116	32	1983	Hotel	Minneapolis	
29	LPM Apartments		375 / 114	36	2014	Residential	Minneapolis	
30	Kellogg Square Apartments		366 / 112	32	1972	Residential	St. Paul	
31	Fifth Street Towers I		356 / 108	26	1987	Office	Minneapolis	
32	Broadway Plaza		342 / 104	29	2004	Residential	Rochester	Tallest building in Rochester; Tallest building outside of the Minneapolis–Saint Paul metropolitan area
33	Minneapolis City Hall		342 / 104	14	1906	Government	Minneapolis	
34	The Pointe of St. Paul		340 / 104	33	1988	Residential	St. Paul	
35	US Bank Center (St. Paul)	US bank Center	338 / 103	25	1975	Office	St. Paul	
36	Riverside Plaza (McKnight Tower)		338 / 103	39	1973	Residential	Minneapolis	
37	365 Nicollet		334 / 102	31	2018	Residential	Minneapolis	
38	City Walk Condominiums & Parking		332 / 101	27	1983	Residential	St. Paul	
39	100 Washington Square		332 / 101	22	1981	Office	Minneapolis	
40	Marquette Tower Apartments (Minneapolis)	Marquette Place Apartments	331 / 101	36	1987	Residential	Minneapolis	
41	Ecolab Global Headquarters (St. Paul)	Ecolab headquarters building	330 / 101	17	1991	Office	St. Paul	Being converted into apartments.
42	110 Grant Apartments		330 / 101	34	1985	Residential	Minneapolis	
43	Bremer Tower		328 / 100	27	1980	Office	St. Paul	
44	The 400 Building		327 / 100	21	1982	Office	St. Paul	
45	Landmark Towers		327 / 100	25	1983	Residential	St. Paul	Also known as the Amhoist Tower on the NRHP listing.
46	US Bank Plaza II		321 / 98	23	1981	Office	Minneapolis	
47	McGladrey Plaza		320 / 98	20	1969	Office/Retail	Minneapolis	
48	Cray Plaza (Sibley Tower)		314 / 96	33	1986	Mixed Use	St. Paul	
49	La Rive Condominiums		312 / 95	29	1987	Residential	Minneapolis	
50	4marq Apartments		311 / 95	30	2015	Residential	Minneapolis	
51	Rand Tower Hotel		311 / 95	26	1929	Hotel	Minneapolis	
52	Churchill Apartments		310 / 95	33	1981	Residential	Minneapolis	
53	Cathedral of Saint Paul		306 / 93	2	1915	Religious	St. Paul	
54	UBS Plaza		305 / 93	25	1980	Office	St. Paul	
55	Ecolab Corporate Center Osborn Building		305 / 93	22	1968	Office	St. Paul	
56	Gonda Building		305 / 93	21	2001	Medical	Rochester	
57	IVY Hotel + Residences		302 / 92	25	2008	Hotel/Residential	Minneapolis	
58	Wells Fargo Plaza		300 / 91	24	1974	Office	Bloomington	
59	Plummer Building		298 / 91	19	1928		Rochester	
60	Mayo Building		295 / 90	20	1955		Rochester	
61	Grant Park Apartments		295 / 90	27	2004		Minneapolis	
62	United States Courthouse, Minneapolis		295 / 90	15	1997		Minneapolis	
63	Wells Fargo Tower East Town 100		295 / 90	17	2016		Minneapolis	
64	Wells Fargo Tower East Town 150		295 / 90	17	2016		Minneapolis	
65	Rafter		291 / 89	26	2019		Minneapolis	
66	Skyscape Condominiums		291 / 89	28	2007		Minneapolis	
67	Hilton Minneapolis		287 / 87	25	1992		Minneapolis	
68	Expo		284 / 87	25	2020		Minneapolis	
69	Hub Minneapolis		284 / 87	26	2018		Minneapolis	
70	Centre Village		277 / 84	26	1985		Minneapolis	
71	Graves 601 Hotel		269 / 82	22	2003		Minneapolis	
72	Riverside Plaza (Chase House)		269 / 82	27	1966		Minneapolis	
73	Malcolm Moos Health Sciences Tower		268 / 82	17	1974		Minneapolis	
74	Riverview Tower		267 / 81	27	1973		Minneapolis	
75	Hilton Rochester Mayo Clinic Area		265 / 81	20	2019		Rochester	
76	Medical Arts Building		265 / 81	19	1924		Minneapolis	
77	Oracle Centre		264 / 81	19	1985		Minneapolis	
78	701 Building		264 / 81	19	1984		Minneapolis	
79	601 Carlson Parkway		263 / 80	16	1989		Minnetonka	
80	701 Carlson Parkway		263 / 80	16	1989		Minnetonka	
81	Soo Line Building		261 / 79	20	1915		Minneapolis	
82	Ameriprise Client Service Center		258 / 78	15	2002		Minneapolis	
83	Guggenheim Building		258 / 78	21	1974		Rochester	
84	Cedar High Apartments		256 / 78	25	1970		Minneapolis	
85	121 South 8th Street		253 / 77	17	1981		Minneapolis	
86	Alworth Building		247 / 75	16	1910		Duluth	Tallest building in Duluth; Tallest building in Minnesota from 1910 until 1915
87	Metropoint Tower		240 / 73	20	1975		St. Louis Park	
88	Skyline Tower	Skyline Tower	240 / 73	24	1972		St. Paul	
89	Optum Tower 1		238 / 72.5	15	2015		Eden Prairie	
90	The Westin Edina Galleria and Residences		236 / 72	18	2008		Edina	
91	8400 Building		235 / 72	17	1985		Bloomington	
92	DoubleTree by Hilton Hotel Minneapolis South		233 / 71	21	1970		Bloomington	formerly Sheraton, originally Radisson South
93	Wilson Park Tower		231 / 70	21	1991		Minneapolis	
94	The Colonnade		225 / 68	16	1988		Golden Valley	
95	Siebens Building		220 / 67	14	1989		Rochester	
96	Nord Haus		218 / 66	20	2018		Minneapolis	
97	Minnesota Center		214 / 65	16	1987		Bloomington	
98	Northland Plaza		214 / 65	15	1985		Bloomington	
99	Stabile Building		211 / 64	13	2006		Rochester	
100	Church of Saint Agnes		205 / 62	2	1887		St. Paul	
101	8170 33rd Avenue		202 / 61	14	1972		Bloomington	
102	3M Center		197 / 60	14	1962		Maplewood	
103	RiverWest Condominium		197 / 60	18	1989		Minneapolis	
104	Riverview Office Tower		196 / 60	15	1973		Bloomington	
105	Edina Park Plaza of Edinborough		195 / 59	18	1987		Edina	
106	The Legacy		192 / 58.5	17	2018		Minneapolis	
107	Medical Arts Building		191 / 58	15	1933		Duluth	
108	Center Plaza		190 / 58	16	1969		Rochester	
109	Greysolon Plaza		190 / 58	13	1925		Duluth	
110	J. R. Watkins Headquarters		185/56	10	1914		Winona	
111	505 Waterford Park		177 / 54	12	1987		Plymouth	
112	The Tower at City Bella		177 / 54	15	2004		Richfield	
113	8000 Tower		175 / 53	13	2001		Bloomington	
114	The Edina Towers		174 / 53	17	1971		Edina	
115	Norman Pointe II		173 / 53	10	2007		Bloomington	
116	Basilica of St Stanislaus Kostka		172/52	3	1895		Winona	
117	Omni Viking Lakes Hotel		171 / 52	14	2020		Eagan	
118	Reflections West Tower		170 / 52	17	2006		Bloomington	
119	Reflections East Tower		170 / 52	17	2006		Bloomington	
120	Eisenberg Building		169 / 52	12	1966		Rochester	
121	8200 Tower		164 / 50	11	2009		Bloomington	
122	Charlton Building		163 / 50	10			Rochester	
123	Grand Casino Hinckley Hotel		162 / 49	13	2007		Hinckley	
124	Crowne Plaza Hotel Minneapolis North		160 / 49	13	1986		Brooklyn Center	
125	Viking Towers		159 / 48	13	1969		Alexandria	
126	UnitedHealth Group, South Building		157 / 48	10	2008		Minnetonka	
127	Radisson Blu at the Mall of America		156 / 47	12	2013		Bloomington	
128	The Kahler Grand Hotel		154 / 47	12	1921		Rochester	
129	Wells Fargo Building		152 / 46	10	1966		Duluth	
130	Riverview Heights Apartments		151 / 46	14	1968		Moorhead	
131	Doubletree Park Place Hotel		150 / 46	15	1981		St. Louis Park	
132	Stonebridge Lofts		148 / 45	12	2014		Minneapolis	
133	Sherburne Hall		141 / 43	13	1969		St. Cloud	
134	Tamarack Hall		141 / 43	12	1969		Bemidji	
135	General Mills Headquarters, Bell Building		140 / 42	10	1958		Golden Valley	
136	Allianz Life, East Building		140 / 42	10	2001		Golden Valley	
137	Sheraton Duluth & Condominiums		140 / 42	11	2007		Duluth	
138	7500 Flying Cloud Drive		140 / 42	10	1987		Eden Prairie	
139	Park Nicollet Methodist Hospital		138 / 42	9	1959		St. Louis Park	
140	Optum Tower 3		138 / 42	8	2013		Eden Prairie	
141	Optum Tower 2		138 / 42	8	2013		Eden Prairie	
142	Board of Trade Building		136 / 41	8	1889		Duluth	
143	John Carroll Building		135 / 41	13	1974		South St. Paul	
144	The Durham Apartments		134 / 40	13	1979		Edina	
145	Cloud 9 Sky Flats		132 / 40	10	1985		Minnetonka	
146	Nelson Hall		131 / 40	12	1966		Moorhead	
147	Parkshore Place Senior Apartments		130 / 40	13	1987		St. Louis Park	
148	Minnesota Bio Business Center		130 / 40	8	2009		Rochester	
149	Hilton Minneapolis South		130 / 40	11	2008		Minneapolis	
150	Point of France		129 / 39	14	1976		Edina	
151	First Lutheran Church		128 / 39	1			Red Wing	
152	7201 Metro Boulevard		126 / 39	9	1981		Edina	
153	Centennial Lakes Office Center V		126 / 39	9	1999		Edina	
154	Centennial Lakes Office Center IV		126 / 39	9	1998		Edina	
155	Gramercy Park Cooperative at Lake Shore Drive		125 / 39	12	2000		Richfield	
156	Best Buy Building 1		123 / 38	8	2003		Richfield	
157	Best Buy Building 3		123 / 38	8	2003		Richfield	
158	CityVue Apartments		122 / 38	11	2015		Eagan	
159	Calvary Center Cooperative		119 / 37	11	1984		Golden Valley	
160	Yorktown Continental Apartments		117 / 36	12	1972		Edina	
161	St. Cloud Hospital		116 / 35	10	1928		St. Cloud	
162	1600 Tower		116 / 35	9	2000		St. Louis Park	
163	North Memorial Medical Center		113 / 34	8	2005		Robbinsdale	
164	Fairview Southdale Hospital		113 / 34	8	1965		Edina	
165	Park Nicollet Heart and Vascular Center		111 / 34	6	2005		St. Louis Park	
166	Metropoint West		110 / 33	10	1982		St. Louis Park	
167	2121 16th Avenue South		106 / 32	12	1963		Minneapolis	

== Tallest buildings under construction ==
Name	use	height (ft / m)	no. of stories	year	status	city
North Loop Green Tower 1	Mixed-Use	418/ 127.5	37	2023	Under construction	Minneapolis
270 Hennepin	Residential	256 / 78.0	23	2022	Under construction	Minneapolis
The Berkman	Mixed-Use	168	13	2019	Under construction	Rochester
Civic on First / Hyatt	hotel		9	2020	Under construction	Rochester
The Bower Apartments	Luxury Apartments	203/ 60.45	19	2021	Under construction	Edina

== Tallest buildings proposed ==
Name	Use	Height (ft/ m)	Stories	Anticipated groundbreaking	status	City
Gonda Building phase III	Office/hotel	490 / 149	32	2022	Proposed	Rochester
365 Nicollet, Phase II	Residential	334 / 101.8	31	2018	Proposed	Minneapolis
Michael's site tower I	Residential	-/-	30	TBD	Proposed	Rochester
17 N Washington	Mixed-Use	-/-	27	TBD	Under Construction	Minneapolis
Block One Residential Tower	Residential	295 / 90.0	25	2019	Proposed	Minneapolis
Nord Haus, Phase II	Residential	293 / 89.3	27	2018	Proposed	Minneapolis
Portland & Washington	Mixed-Use	245 / 74.7	22	2019	Under Construction	Minneapolis
240 Park Ave	Residential	187 / 57.0	17	Spring 2019	Complete	Minneapolis
3326-3350 University Avenue SE	Mixed-Use	184 / 56.1	17	2018	Proposed	Minneapolis
8th Street Apartments	Residential	184 / 56.1	18	2019	Proposed	Minneapolis
CPM Apartments	Residential	184 / 56.1	16	2018	Proposed	Minneapolis
8100 tower	office	-/-	15	TBD	Proposed	Bloomington
Fe Equus	Residential	124 / 37.8	11	2018	Proposed	Minneapolis
Oppidan Apartments	Mixed-Use	115 / 33.5	10	2018	Proposed	Minneapolis

== Tallest buildings approved ==
Name	Type	Height* ft / m	Floor Count	Anticipated Groundbreaking	Notes	City
Alia Tower (200 Central)	Residential	483 / 147.2	42	May 2019	Approved	Minneapolis
12th Street Apartments	Residential	415 / 126.5	32	2018	Approved	Minneapolis
Bloom International tower I	hotel	370 / 113	28	2019	Approved	Rochester
Calhoun Tower I	Residential	287 / 87.5	26	2018	Approved	Minneapolis
Calhoun Tower II	Residential	286 / 87.2	26	2018	Approved	Minneapolis
Bloom international tower II	Residential	255 / 78	20	2019	Approved	Rochester

== See also ==
- List of tallest buildings in Minneapolis
- List of tallest buildings in St. Paul
- List of tallest buildings in Rochester, Minnesota

== Sources ==
- Emporis - Minneapolis
- Emporis - St. Paul
- Emporis - Rochester
- Emporis - Bloomington
- Emporis - Duluth
- Emporis - Edina
- Emporis - St. Louis Park
- Emporis - Golden Valley
- Emporis - Richfield
- Emporis - Brooklyn Center
- Emporis - Moorhead
- Emporis - Maplewood
- Emporis - Eden Prairie
- Emporis - South St. Paul
- Emporis - Mankato
- Emporis - Red Wing
- Emporis - Robbinsdale
- Emporis - Bemidji
- Emporis - Alexandria
