= List of tallest buildings in Saint Paul =

Skyline of Saint Paul
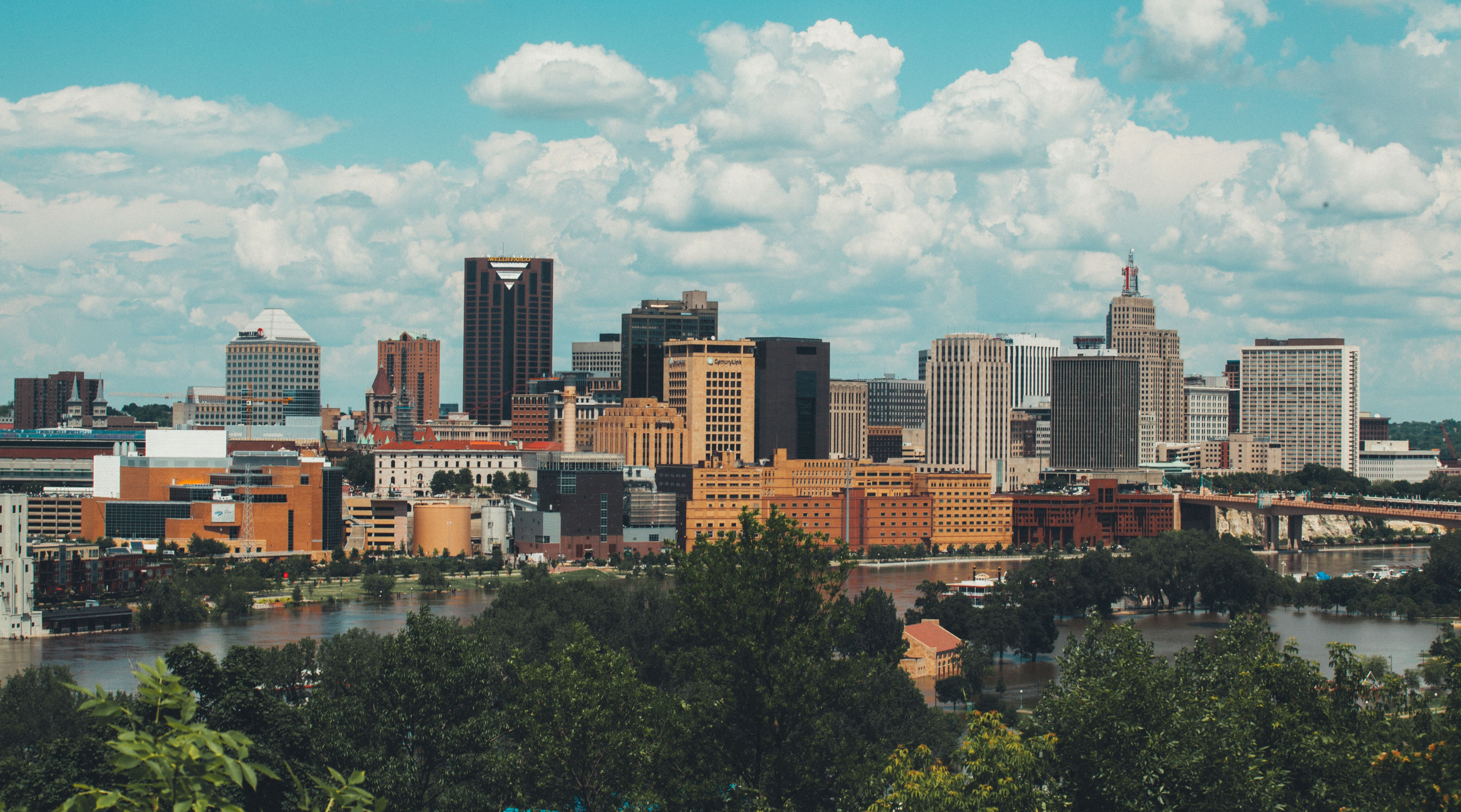
- Saint Paul in 2015 across the Mississippi River
- Tallest building: Wells Fargo Place (1987)
- Tallest building height: 471 ft (143.6 m)

Number of tall buildings (2026)
- Taller than 100 m (328 ft): 8

Number of tall buildings — feet
- Taller than 200 ft (61.0 m): 29
- Taller than 300 ft (91.4 m): 14

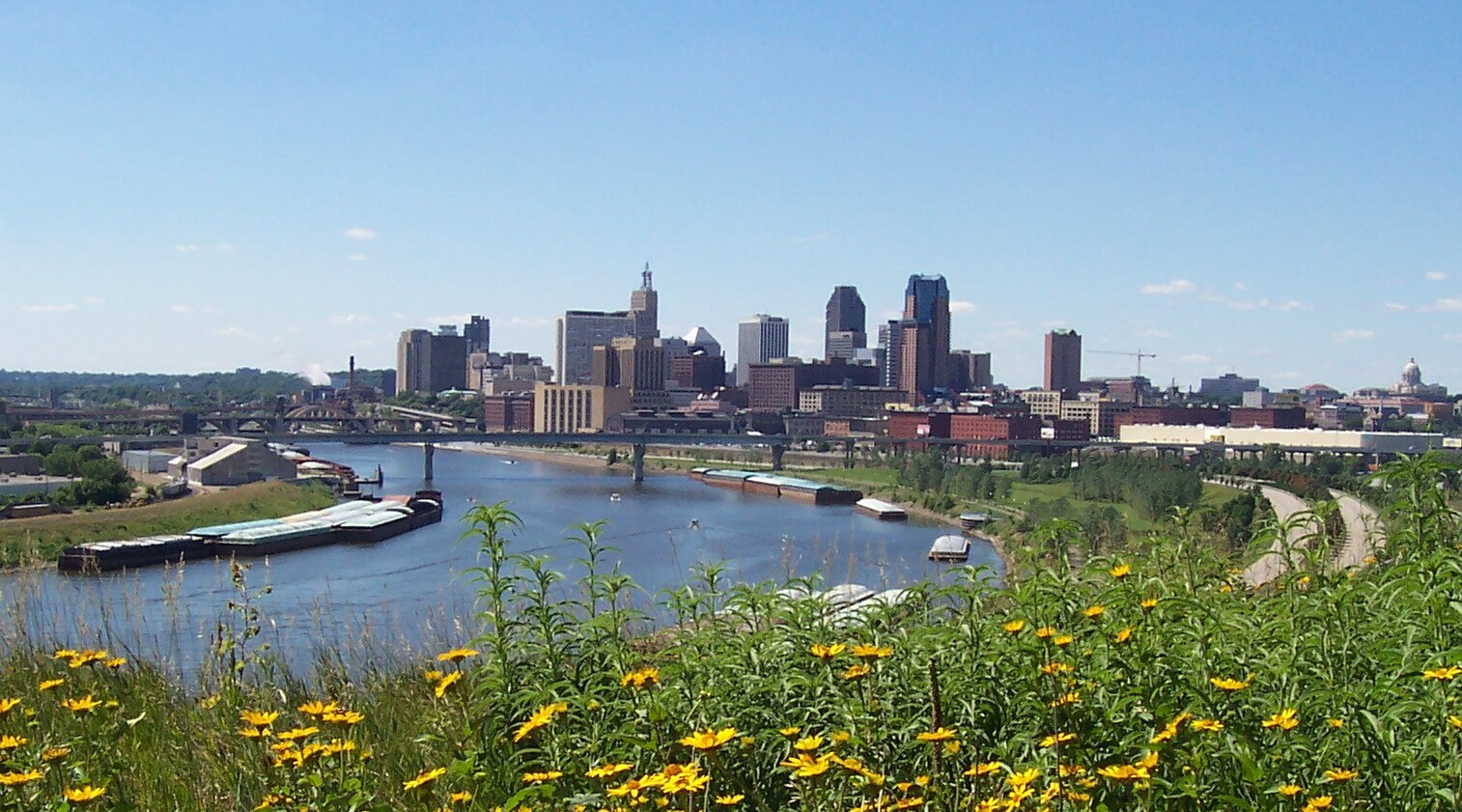
Saint Paul from Indian Mounds Regional Park

Saint Paul is the capital of the U.S. state of Minnesota. Saint Paul and neighboring Minneapolis form the core of the Twin Cities metropolitan area, which has a population of around 3.7 million. The city is the site of 60 high-rises, 28 of which stand taller than 200 feet (61 m). Of these, 14 buildings reach a height of 300 ft (91 m), giving Saint Paul the second largest skyline in the state, after Minneapolis. The tallest building in Saint Paul is Wells Fargo Place, a 471 ft (144 m), 37-story tall office building constructed in 1987. Saint Paul's skyscrapers are approximately 8 miles (13 km) east of Downtown Minneapolis.

The history of skyscrapers in Saint Paul began with the 16-story Pioneer Building, built in 1889. Considered the city's first skyscraper, the Pioneer Building was the tallest building west of Chicago at the time of construction, and the first building in the United States to have a glass elevator. The early 20th century saw the construction of the Landmark Center, the Minnesota State Capitol, and the Cathedral of Saint Paul, three architecturally significant civic buildings. The Art Deco First National Bank Building was completed in 1931 at a height of 402 ft (123 m), becoming the tallest building in Saint Paul, a title it would hold for over half a century. A year later, amidst the Great Depression, the 20-story city hall was completed.

From the 1960s to the 1980s, Saint Paul's skyline expanded considerably. In 1980, the Town Square three-tower development brought about the 27-story Bremer Tower and the 25-story UBS Plaza. The 1980s saw a shift towards postmodern architecture, with the two-tower Galtier Plaza (now Cray Plaza) designed in this style. The taller Jackson Tower briefly became the tallest building in Saint Paul with a height of 443 ft (135 m), before being surpassed by Wells Fargo Place in 1987. The Pointe of St. Paul, built in 1988, was among the last high-rises added to Saint Paul's skyline. Since 2001, no buildings taller than 200 ft (61 m) have been built in Saint Paul, in contrast to nearby Minneapolis.

Saint Paul's tallest buildings are concentrated in Downtown Saint Paul, which sits northwest of the Mississippi River. Like its twin city of Minneapolis, Saint Paul features a skyway system, connecting its high-rises (among other buildings) with bridges. Saint Paul's skyline is also known for the large red "1st" sign atop the First National Bank Building.

== History ==
Number of buildings by height in Saint Paul by the end of each year, based on the information in this article. Click on the legend to toggle a specific height on or off. View chart definition.

== Map of tallest buildings ==
The map below shows the location of buildings taller than 200 ft (61 m) in Saint Paul, most of which are located in downtown. Each marker is numbered by the building's height rank, and colored by the decade of its completion.

Buildings taller than 200 ft (61 m) in Saint Paul. An asterisk (*) next to the building's name indicates it is located outside the map.
- 1950s and before
- 1960s
- 1970s
- 1980s
- 1990s
- 2000s
1 Wells Fargo Place
2 Jackson Tower
3 First National Bank Building
4 Kellogg Square Apartments
5 The Pointe of St. Paul
6 US Bank Building
7 Ecolab Building
8 Bremer Tower
9 The 400 Building
10 Amhoist Tower
11 Sibley Tower
12 Cathedral of Saint Paul
13 Ecolab Corporate Center
14 UBS Plaza
15 Custom House
16 Saint Paul City Hall and Ramsey County Courthouse
17 401 Building
18 Ecolab University Center
19 City Walk Condominiums
20 InterContinental Saint Paul Riverfront
21 Century Link Tower B
22 Century Link Tower C
23 Skyline Tower*
24 740 River Drive*
25 Merchants Bank Building
26 Pioneer Building
27 Fifth Street Center
28 Minnesota State Capitol
29 Landmark Center

== Cityscape ==
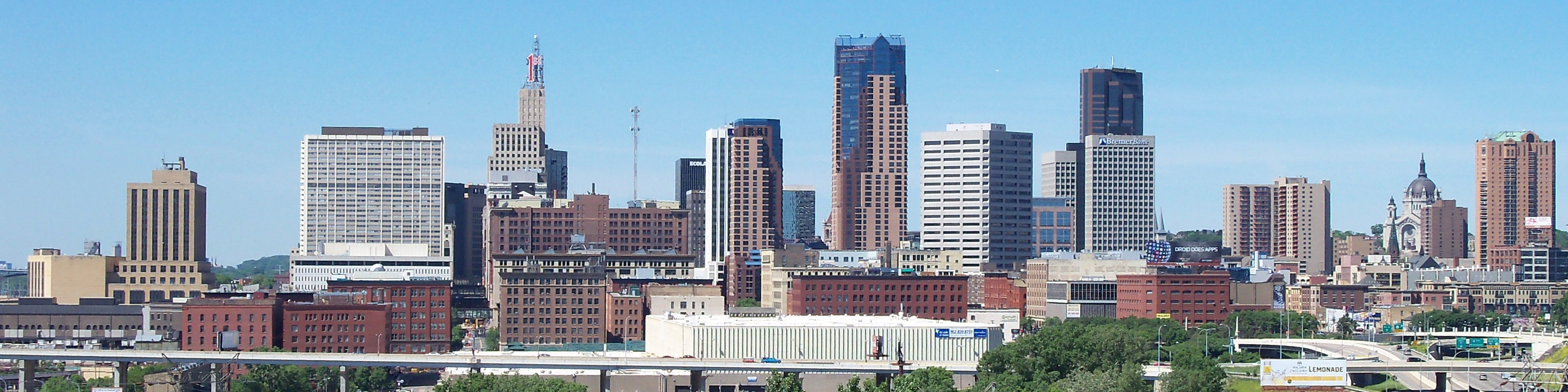
Downtown Saint Paul, looking west in 2010

== Tallest buildings ==
This list ranks completed buildings in Saint Paul that stand at least 200 ft (61 m) tall as of 2026, based on standard height measurement. This includes spires and architectural details but does not include antenna masts. The “Year” column indicates the year of completion. Buildings tied in height are sorted by year of completion with earlier buildings ranked first, and then alphabetically.

Was the tallest building in Saint Paul upon completion

Rank	Name	Image	Location	Height ft (m)	Floors	Year	Purpose	Notes
1	Wells Fargo Place		44°56′53″N 93°05′44″W	471 (143.6)	37	1987	Office	Tallest building in Saint Paul since 1987. Tallest building completed in Saint Paul in the 1980s. Formerly known as the Minnesota World Trade Center. Tallest building in Minnesota outside of Minneapolis.
2	Jackson Tower		44°56′56″N 93°05′23″W	443 (135)	46	1986	Residential	Tallest building in Saint Paul briefly from 1986 to 1987. Tallest residential building in Saint Paul. Building with the most floors in Saint Paul. Part of Cray Plaza along with Sibley Tower. Cray Plaza was known as Galtier Plaza until 2009.
3	First National Bank Building		44°56′47″N 93°05′28″W	402 (122.5)	32	1931	Office	Tallest building in Saint Paul from 1931 to 1986. Tallest building completed in Saint Paul in the 1930s. Also known for the red "1st" sign atop the building.
4	Kellogg Square Apartments		44°56′46″N 93°05′24″W	366 (111.6)	32	1972	Residential	Tallest building completed in Saint Paul in the 1970s.
5	The Pointe of St. Paul		44°57′01″N 93°05′45″W	340 (103.6)	33	1988	Residential	
6	US Bank Building		44°56′51″N 93°05′30″W	338 (103.1)	25	1975	Office	
7	Ecolab Building		44°56′48″N 93°05′52″W	330 (100.6)	17	1991	Office	Tallest building completed in Saint Paul in the 1990s. Formerly known as the Travelers Building.
8	Bremer Tower		44°56′55″N 93°05′39″W	328 (100)	27	1980	Office	
9	The 400 Building		44°56′56″N 93°05′29″W	327 (99.7)	21	1982	Office	
10	Amhoist Tower		44°56′40″N 93°05′44″W	327 (99.6)	26	1983	Mixed-use	Mixed-use residential and office building. Also known as Landmark Towers.
11	Sibley Tower		44°56′55″N 93°05′19″W	314 (95.6)	33	1986	Mixed-use	Mixed-use residential and office building. Part of Cray Plaza along with Jackson Tower. Cray Plaza was known as Galtier Plaza until 2009.
12	Cathedral of Saint Paul		44°56′49″N 93°06′33″W	306 (93.3)	2	1915	Religious	Tallest building in St. Paul from 1915 to 1931. Tallest building completed in Saint Paul in the 1910s.
13	Ecolab Corporate Center		44°56′46″N 93°05′39″W	305 (93)	20	1968	Office	Tallest building completed in Saint Paul in the 1960s.
14	UBS Plaza	—	44°56′54″N 93°05′41″W	305 (93)	25	1980	Office	Also known as Piper Jaffray Plaza, US Bancorp Piper Jaffray Tower, Meritor Tower, and Conwed Tower.
15	Custom House		44°56′48″N 93°05′14″W	274 (83.5)	17	1934	Mixed-use	The structure was initially completed in 1934 by the Works Progress Administration. Five stories and a penthouse were added in 1939. Used by the U.S. Postal Service until 2013, after which it was converted to a mixed-use hotel and residential building.
16	Saint Paul City Hall and Ramsey County Courthouse		44°56′39″N 93°05′38″W	261 (79.5)	18	1932	Government	
17	401 Building	—	44°56′55″N 93°05′33″W	256 (78.1)	13	2000	Office	Tallest building in St. Paul completed in the 21st century.
18	Ecolab University Center	—	44°56′47″N 93°05′41″W	254 (77.4)	16	1973	Office	
19	City Walk Condominiums	—	44°56′58″N 93°05′42″W	250 (76) (Note: Sources do not state the exact height of this building. This figure was determined using Google Earth by subtracting the altitude of the building's lowest main pedestrian open-air entrance from its highest architectural point.)	25	1983	Residential	
20	InterContinental Saint Paul Riverfront		44°56′40″N 93°05′33″W	245 (74.7)	23	1966	Hotel	Formerly known as Radisson Riverfront and Crowne Plaza Riverfront St. Paul.
21	Century Link Tower B	—	44°56′38″N 93°05′44″W	243 (74.1)	16	1968	Office	Also known as Qwest Building B, Market Street Tower 1, and US West Tower 1.
22	Century Link Tower C	—	44°56′38″N 93°05′42″W	243 (74.1)	16	1976	Office	Also known as Qwest Building C, Market Street Tower 2, and US West Tower 2.
23	Skyline Tower		44°57′10″N 93°09′10″W	240 (73)	24	1972	Residential	
24	740 River Drive	—	44°55′10″N 93°11′53″W	229 (69.8)	22	1961	Residential	
25	Merchants Bank Building	—	44°56′48″N 93°05′26″W	227 (69.3)	16	1915	Office	
26	Pioneer Building		44°56′49″N 93°05′24″W	226 (69)	16	1889	Residential	Tallest building in Saint Paul from 1889 to 1915. Tallest building completed in Saint Paul in the 19th century.
27	Fifth Street Center	—	44°56′48″N 93°05′35″W	226 (68.9)	14	1969	Office	
28	Minnesota State Capitol		44°57′19″N 93°06′08″W	223 (68)	4	1904	Government	Home to the Minnesota Legislature. Tallest building completed in Saint Paul in the 1900s.
29	Landmark Center		44°56′45″N 93°05′50″W	221 (67.4)	6	1902	Office	

== Tallest under construction or proposed ==
=== Under construction ===
As of 2026, there are no buildings planned to be taller than 200 ft (61 m) that are under construction in Saint Paul. The most recent building constructed taller than that height is the 401 Building, which was completed in 2000.

=== Proposed ===
The following table includes approved and proposed buildings in Saint Paul that are expected to be at least 200 ft (61 m) tall as of 2026, based on standard height measurement. The “Year” column indicates the expected year of completion. A dash “–“ indicates information about the building’s height, floor count, or year of completion is unknown or has not been released. For buildings whose height figure is unavailable, a cutoff of 20 stories is used.

Name	Height ft (m)	Floors	Year	Purpose	Notes
Riversedge Tower 4	440 (134.1)	29	—	Office	
Riversedge Tower 2	—	31	—	Residential	
Riversedge Tower 3	—	24	—	Office	

== Timeline of tallest buildings ==
Since the construction of the Pioneer Building in 1889, five buildings have held the title of the tallest building in Saint Paul.

Name	Image	Years as tallest	Height ft (m)	Floors	Reference
Pioneer Building		1889–1915	226 (69)	16	
Cathedral of Saint Paul		1915–1931	306 (93.3)	2	
First National Bank Building		1931–1986	402 (122.5)	32	
Jackson Tower		1986–1987	443 (135)	46	
Wells Fargo Place		1987–present	471 (143.6)	37	

== See also ==
- List of tallest buildings in Minneapolis
- List of tallest buildings in Minnesota
- List of tallest buildings in Rochester, Minnesota
