= Downtown Saint Paul =

Neighborhood in Minnesota, United States

Coordinates: 44°56′50″N 93°5′30″W

- Neighborhood
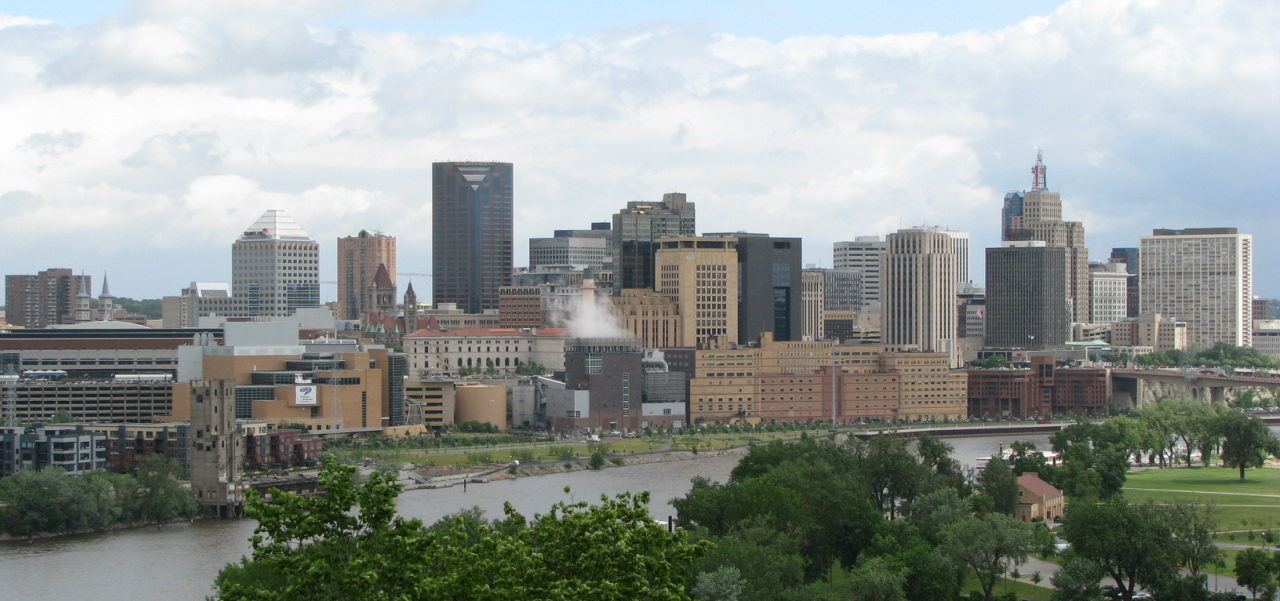
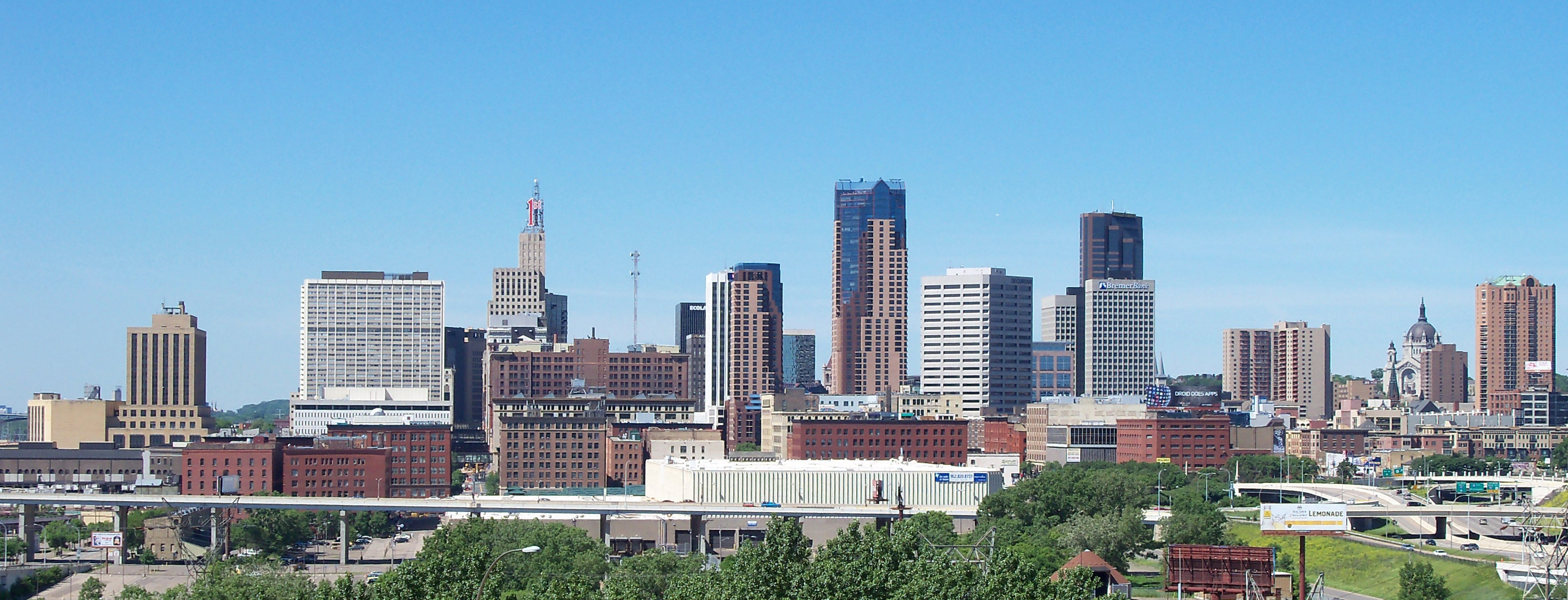
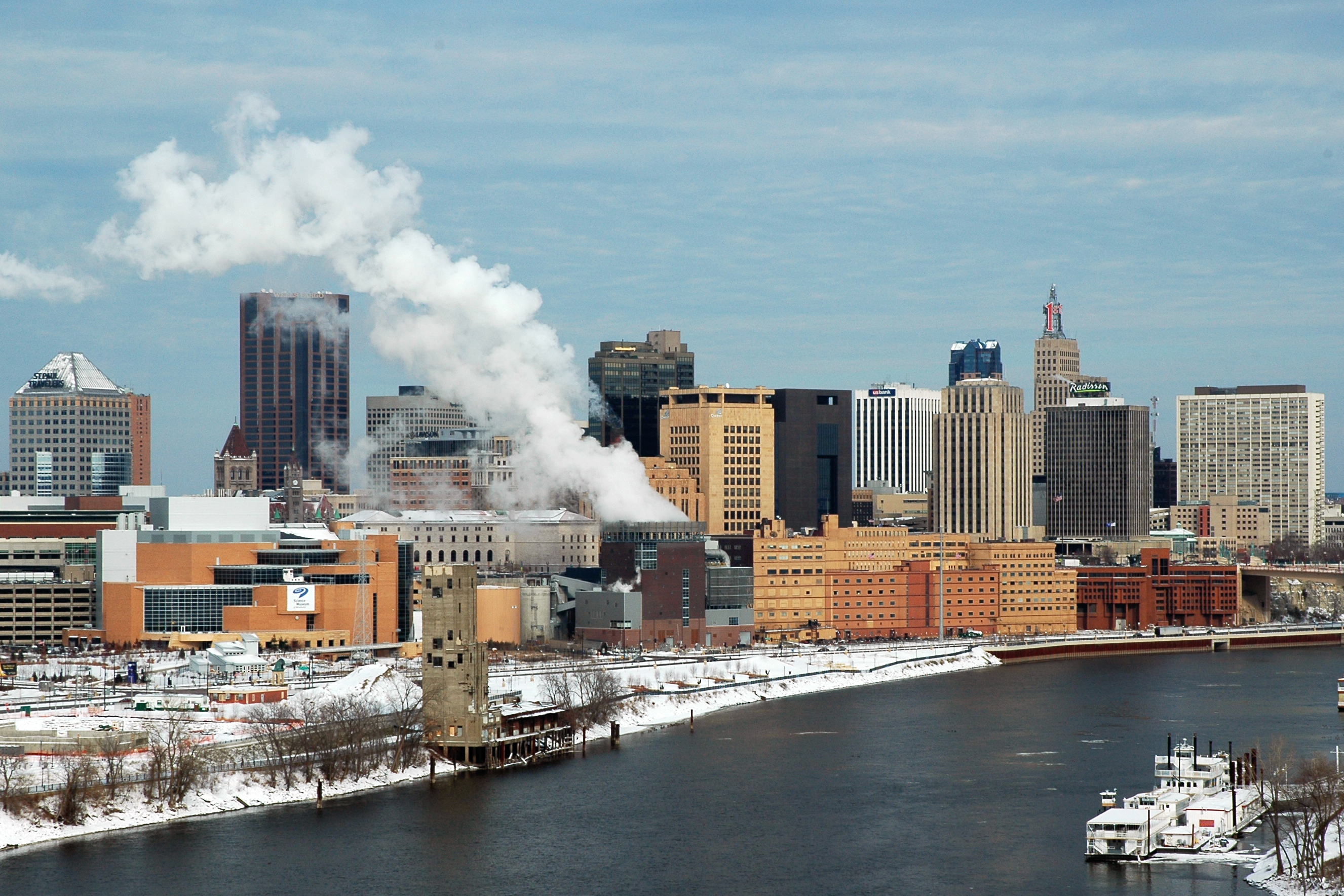
- Views of Downtown Saint Paul
- Interactive map of Downtown Saint Paul
- Country: United States
- State: Minnesota
- County: Ramsey
- City: Saint Paul
- Established: 1839

Area
  - Total: 1.010 sq mi (2.62 km^{2})

Population (2023)
  - Total: 10,000
  - Density: 9,900/sq mi (3,800/km^{2})
- Time zone: UTC-6 (CST)
  - Summer (DST): UTC-5 (CDT)
- ZIP code: 55101
- Area code: 651

Downtown Saint Paul is the central business district of Saint Paul, Minnesota, United States. Its boundaries are the Mississippi River to the south, University Avenue to the north, US 52 to the east, and Kellogg Boulevard to the west. It is bounded by the Dayton's Bluff, Summit-University, West Seventh, Frogtown, West Side, and Payne-Phalen neighborhoods. The West Side neighborhood is on the other side of the river, and can be accessed via the Robert Street Bridge or the Wabasha Street Bridge. Interstate 35E and Interstate 94 run through the north side of the neighborhood, providing a separation between the Minnesota State Capitol and other state government buildings with the rest of downtown.

Historical population
Census	Pop.	Note	%±
1990	4,410		—
2000	5,743		30.2%
2010	6,604		15.0%
2020 (est.)	10,000		51.4%

== Government ==
The Minnesota State Capitol is on downtown's northern edge. Work began on the current capitol building in 1896 and was completed in 1905. The early 1950s saw the development of the expansive mall surrounding the capitol. This development required the demolition of many homes, apartments, churches, and businesses, and paved the way for the construction of four government agency buildings surrounding the mall: the Veteran Services Building, the Transportation Building, the Centennial Office Building, and the National Guard Armory. Saint Paul City Hall and Ramsey County Courthouse is also downtown.

== Economy ==
Several corporations and institutions are in downtown Saint Paul. Since 1933, Ecolab has maintained its headquarters downtown. In 1989, Twin Cities PBS relocated to its current location downtown. In 1997, the Minnesota State Colleges and Universities System moved its headquarters to Wells Fargo Place. Minnesota Public Radio purchased its downtown headquarters in 2001 from the Public Housing Agency of St. Paul. In 2005, Gander Mountain relocated to downtown. Securian Financial Group is in the Securian Center and is the largest private employer downtown, with 2,600 employees. Travelers Insurance maintains a large presence downtown, employing 2,000 people. In 2009, supercomputer manufacturer Cray Inc. relocated to become the anchor tenant of Cray Plaza downtown. Catholic Charities USA maintains a large two-building campus adjacent to Grand Casino Arena, one of several homeless shelters in downtown St. Paul.

The economy and general well-being of downtown St. Paul have fluctuated since the mid-20th century, when suburbs first drew away many downtown anchor tenants, such as department stores. The first major urban renewal push occurred in the mid-1960s with the construction of many of the buildings that remain downtown's most prominent. During Norm Coleman's mayoralty, from 1994 to 2002, several new tenants moved to downtown St. Paul from Minneapolis, and major construction occurred, including Grand Casino Arena. The district remained relatively stable for the next 20 years. As in many other downtowns, the COVID-19 pandemic caused an exodus of tenants. In the following years, office-to-residential conversions have become common downtown. Some of the tenants that left downtown in the wake of the pandemic have returned, but the district has continued to struggle with high vacancy rates, homelessness, and crime into the mid-2020s.

== Lowertown ==
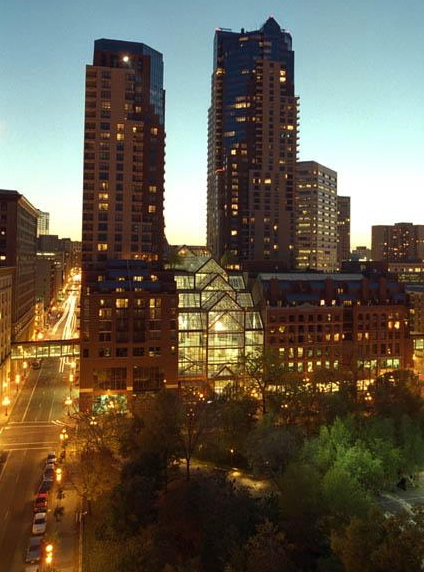
A view of Cray Plaza with Mears Park in the foreground

The Lowertown Historic District is a historic district on the east side of downtown St. Paul. This 16-block warehouse and wholesaling district comprises 37 contributing properties built between the 1870s and 1920. It was listed on the National Register of Historic Places in 1983 for the significance of its river and rail connections, economic impact, architecture, and urban planning. Lowertown has recently been changing from a bohemian community into a gentrified neighborhood filled with coffee shops, restaurants, bars, breweries, and market-rate apartments.

Lowertown is the home of the Saint Paul Union Depot, a historic railroad station that is still a transportation hub for Amtrak, Greyhound Lines, and the Metro Green Line.

== Parks ==
Downtown has three city parks, two of which predate Minnesota statehood. The land for both Mears Park and Rice Park was donated to the city of Saint Paul in 1849. Both parks have undergone numerous renovations and host several festivals. Rice Park most notably hosts the Saint Paul Winter Carnival, the nation's oldest winter carnival, having operated since 1886. Since 1999, Mears Park has hosted the Twin Cities Jazz Festival. Downtown's third park is Kellogg Mall Park, which has fountains, an arbor, and a paved bike trail along the river.

== Culture ==
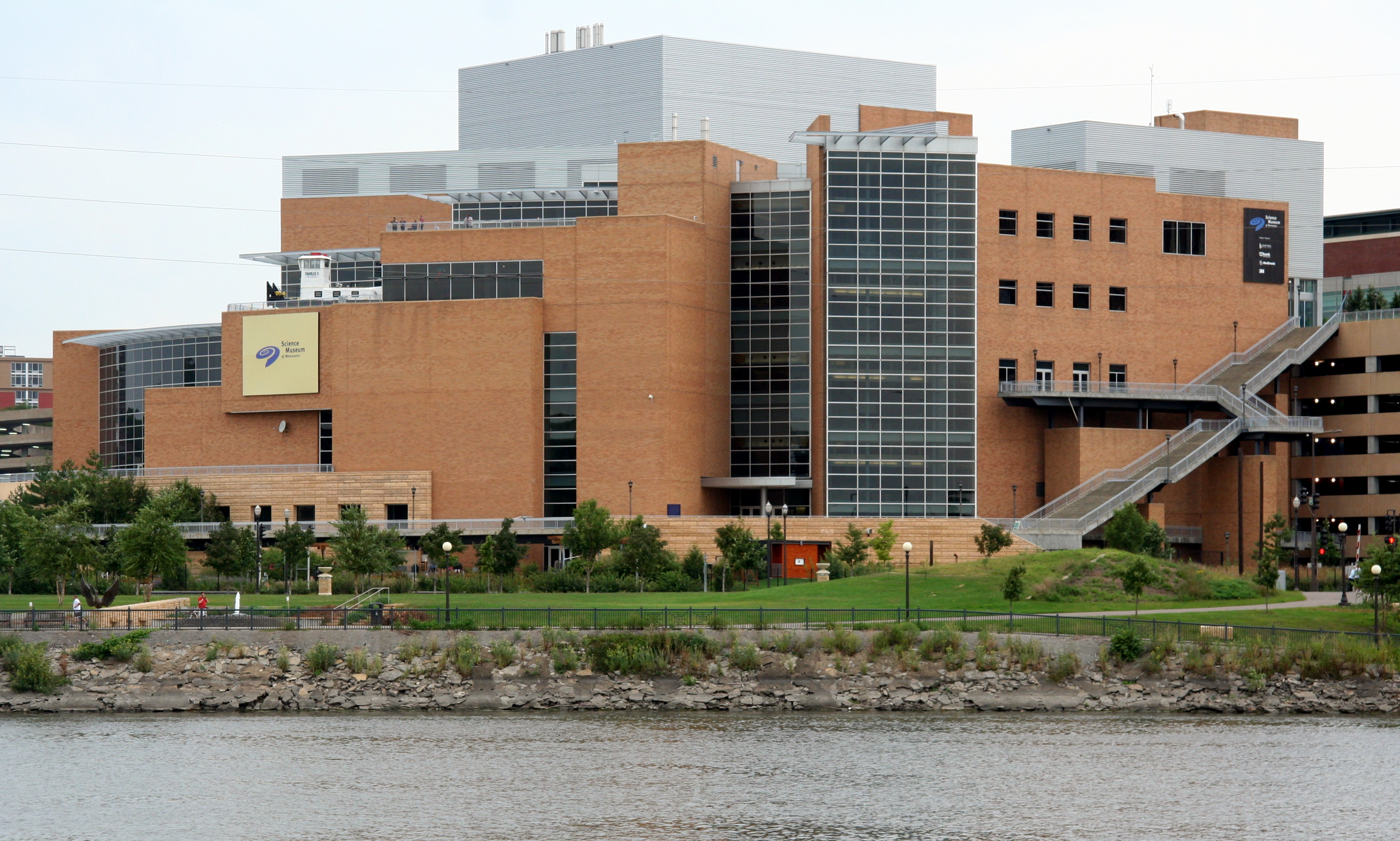
A southern view of the Science Museum of Minnesota from across the Mississippi River

The Saint Paul Public Library system operates the Central Library, which has been on the National Register of Historic Places since 1975. James J. Hill Reference Library is within the Central Library. Landmark Center is on the north side of Rice Park.

=== Theater & performing arts ===
- Palace Theatre
- Ordway Center for the Performing Arts
- Roy Wilkins Auditorium
- Fitzgerald Theater
- Saint Paul Chamber Orchestra

=== Museums ===
- Minnesota Children's Museum
- Minnesota Museum of American Art
- Minnesota History Center
- Science Museum of Minnesota

== Sports ==
In September 2000, Grand Casino Arena opened in downtown to serve as the home of the Minnesota Wild. Apart from hosting the Wild, Grand Casino Arena has hosted the U.S. Figure Skating Championships, the NCAA Men's Ice Hockey Championship, the Minnesota State High School League Boys' Hockey Tournament, the WNBA's Minnesota Lynx, and the now defunct National Lacrosse League team Minnesota Swarm.

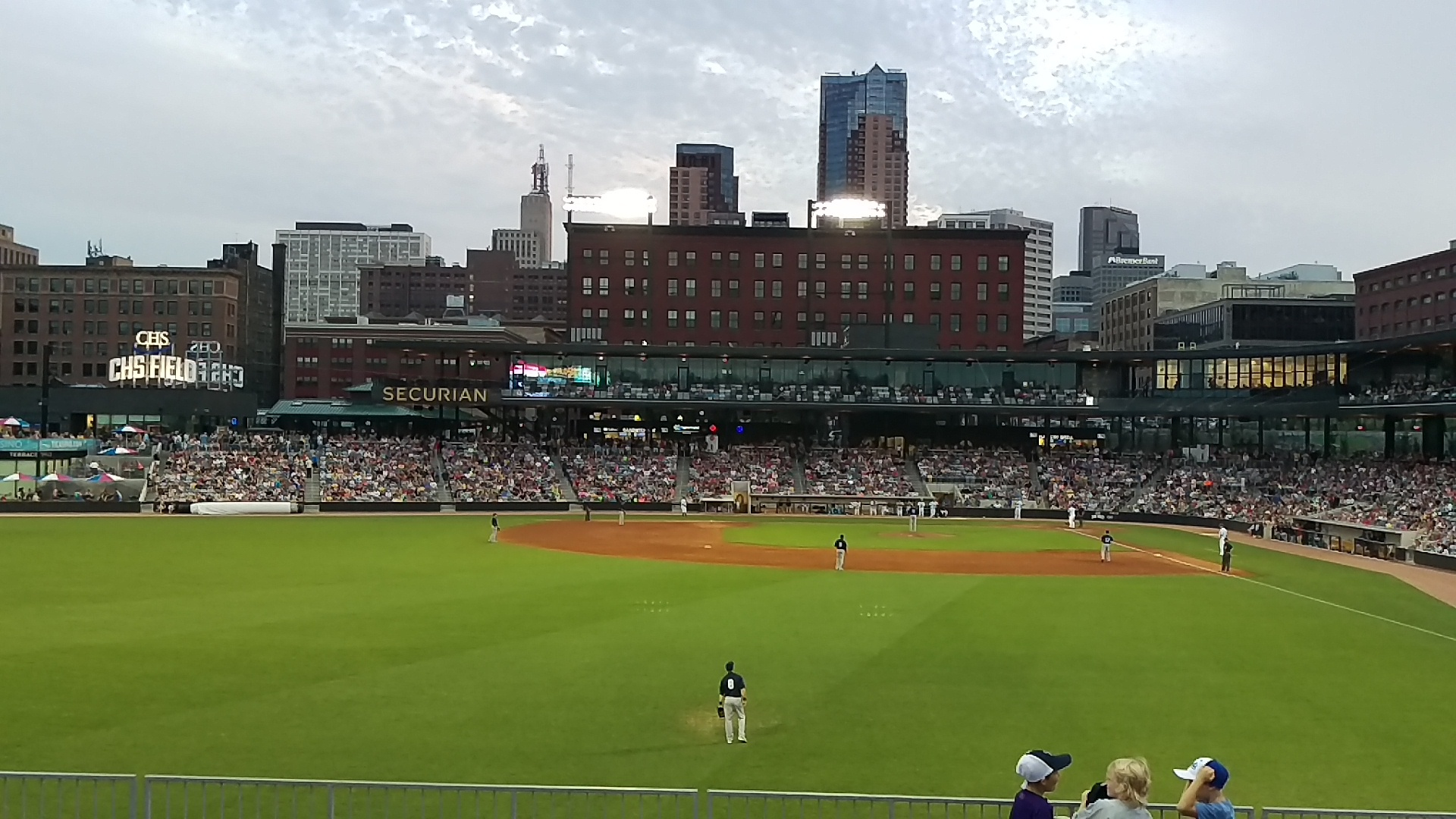
A view of CHS Field and the St. Paul skyline from left field

CHS Field, in Lowertown, opened in 2015 at a cost of $63 million. It serves as the home field of the Saint Paul Saints of the American Association of Independent Professional Baseball. An average of 8,438 fans attend Saints games at CHS Field, the seventh-highest average attendance in minor league baseball.

The Saints' move from Midway Stadium to CHS Field marks the return of baseball to downtown since the St. Paul Saints of the American Association played their games at The Pillbox from 1903 to 1909. The Pillbox, or Downtown Stadium, was on the current site of the Metro Green Line Robert Street station, between 12th and 13th Streets.

In January 2018, TRIA Rink opened on the top floor of the former Macy's building, since renamed Treasure Island Center. TRIA Rink is the Minnesota Wild's practice facility and the home arena for the Minnesota Whitecaps of the National Women's Hockey League and Hamline University's hockey program.

Since 2011, downtown has hosted Red Bull Crashed Ice. Crashed Ice is a winter extreme sporting event featuring ice cross downhill (or downhill ice cross), which involves downhill skating in an urban environment on a track with steep turns and high vertical drops. The event coincides with the Saint Paul Winter Carnival and draws crowds of more than 100,000.

== Transportation ==
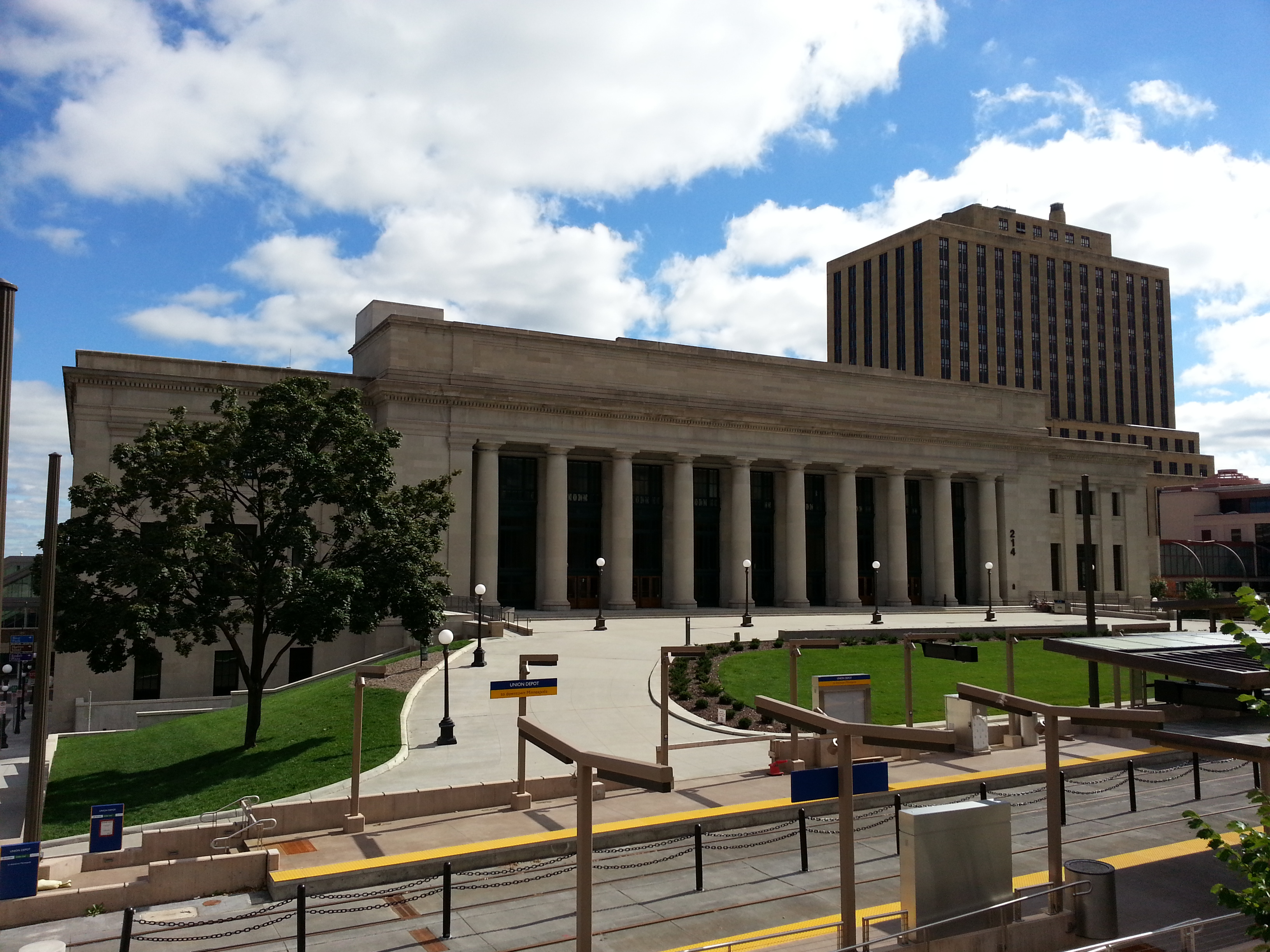
A view of the Union Depot station

The neighborhood is served by five stops along the METRO Green Line light rail system:

- Capitol/Rice Street
- Robert Street station
- 10th Street station
- Central station
- Union Depot station

=== Skyway ===
Like its twin city, Minneapolis, downtown Saint Paul has a skyway system consisting of 40 bridges that link most of the buildings along Kellogg Boulevard with the midcentury office core. The skyway is open every day from 6 a.m. to 2 a.m., but businesses in the skyway generally close at 6 p.m. and on the weekends. Prominent buildings connected to the skyway include:

- Cray Plaza
- Hamm Building
- First National Bank Building
- Minnesota Building
- Wells Fargo Place

== Education ==
=== Primary and secondary ===
- Saint Paul Preparatory School
- Creative Arts Senior High School
- Saint Paul Conservatory for Performing Artists

=== Higher Education ===
- College of St. Scholastica satellite location
- McNally Smith College of Music, defunct
