= Town Square (Saint Paul) =

Mixed use development in Saint Paul, Minnesota, US

Town Square Complex
- Interactive map of the Town Square Complex area

General information
- Type: Commercial
- Location: 445 Minnesota Street, Saint Paul, Minnesota, United States
- Coordinates: 44°56′53″N 93°5′39″W
- Construction started: 1979
- Completed: 1980
- Owner: Sentinel Property Management

Height
- Roof: 328 ft (100 m)/305 ft (93 m)/206 ft (63 m)

Technical details
- Floor count: 27; 25; 16

Design and construction
- Architect: Skidmore, Owings & Merrill

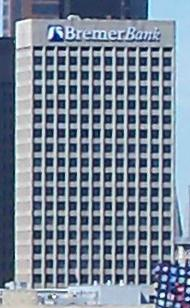
The Bremer Tower

The Town Square Complex is a three-building mixed use development in Downtown Saint Paul, Minnesota, United States. The complex contains the 27-story Bremer Tower, the 25-story UBS Plaza, and the 16-story DoubleTree by Hilton St. Paul Downtown hotel. The modernist building complex also contains two stories of commercial and retail space and is connected to several nearby buildings such as Wells Fargo Place via elevated skyway.

== History ==
The Town Square complex was built in 1980 as a public-private partnership with the City of Saint Paul, originally containing two office towers, a hotel, two floors of retail anchored by a Donaldson's department store, and an indoor park on the third floor above the shopping mall. The complex was originally slated to feature a terminal for a proposed people mover system that would have run from downtown Saint Paul to the Minnesota State Capitol. An empty diagonal slat between the Bremer Tower and UBS Plaza towers marks where the terminal would have been.

The enclosed park, which was operated and maintained by the city of Saint Paul, featured over 250 species of live plants and water features including a waterfall and a stream underneath a glass roof containing over 1,000 glass panels. From 1989 to 2000, the indoor park featured Cafesjian's Carousel, a carousel built in 1914 by the Philadelphia Toboggan Company which the City of St. Paul acquired from the Minnesota State Fair; the carousel was eventually moved to Como Park. In 2000, the indoor park was closed and sold to a private owner to be used as a wedding and event venue, however, the business was not able to open due to the space requiring over $2 million in repairs due to leaks; the City of Saint Paul was ordered to pay $200,000 in damages. The indoor park has since remained vacant and is closed to the public.

== See also ==
- List of tallest buildings in Saint Paul
