= FinnFest USA =

Annual festival in North America celebrating Finnish culture

- Official logo
- Status: Active
- Genre: Festival
- Frequency: Annually
- Years active: 43
- Inaugurated: August 4, 1983
- Most recent: September 19-22, 2019
- Participants: 2,000–7,000
- Area: North America
- Website: Official website

FinnFest USA is an annual festival, typically held in the summer, in locations throughout the United States of America. Aiming to celebrate Finland, Finnish America, and Finnish culture, the festival is organized by a 501(c)(3) non-profit organization with a national office maintained by its president, located presently in Minneapolis, Minnesota.

The inaugural festival was held in Minneapolis, Minnesota, in 1983 with approximately 1,000 people attending. Subsequent festivals have taken place in locations throughout the country, typically hosted by communities with connections to Finnish-American cultural history. Attendance has varied from 2,000 to 7,000, depending on the location. Many attendants, performers and lecturers also include visitors from Finland. Festival events include lectures, classes, concerts, films, theatrical performances, dances, exhibitions and ceremonies. The festivals are financed by registration fees, event tickets, raffles, and many forms of donation and sponsorship.

2020 and 2021 being held virtually due to the COVID-19 pandemic. The 2023 festival was held in Duluth, Minnesota.

== Past sites ==
- 1983: Leamington Hotel & Loring Park (Minneapolis)
- 1984: Fitchburg State University (Fitchburg, Massachusetts)
- 1985: Finlandia University (Hancock, Michigan)
- 1986: University of California, Berkeley (Berkeley, California)
- 1987: Schoolcraft College (Livonia, Michigan)
- 1988: University of Delaware (Newark, Delaware)
- 1989: University of Washington (Seattle)
- 1990: Finlandia University (Hancock, Michigan)
- 1991: Bryant Park (Lake Worth Beach, Florida)
- 1992: University of Minnesota Duluth (Duluth, Minnesota)
- 1993: California Lutheran University (Thousand Oaks, California)
- 1994: Northern Illinois University (DeKalb, Illinois)
- 1995: Lewis & Clark College (Portland, Oregon)
- 1996: Northern Michigan University (Marquette, Michigan)
- 1997: All Seasons Arena (Minot, North Dakota)
- 1998: University of Southern Maine (Gorham, Maine)
- 1999: University of Washington (Seattle)
- 2000: Mel Lastman Square (Toronto)
- 2001: Villanova University (Philadelphia)
- 2002: University of Minnesota (Minneapolis)
- 2004: Bryant Park (Lake Worth Beach, Florida)
- 2005: Northern Michigan University (Marquette, Michigan)
- 2006: Astoria/Naselle High Schools (Astoria, Oregon/Naselle, Washington)
- 2007: Kent State University at Ashtabula (Ashtabula, Ohio)
- 2008: Duluth Entertainment Convention Center (Duluth, Minnesota)
- 2009: Holland America MS Westerdam (Alaskan Inside Passage cruise)
- 2010: GFL Memorial Gardens (Sault Ste. Marie, Ontario)
- 2011: Town and Country Resort Convention Center (San Diego)
- 2012: DoubleTree - Reid Park (Tucson, Arizona)
- 2013: Michigan Technological University & Finlandia University (Houghton/Hancock, Michigan)
- 2014: Hyatt Regency Conference Center (Minneapolis, Minnesota)
- 2015: Kleinhans Music Hall (Buffalo, New York)
- 2016: Holland America MS Veendam (Saint Lawrence Seaway cruise)
- 2017: Hilton Minneapolis, Minnesota Orchestral Hall & American Swedish Institute (Minneapolis)
- 2018: University of Tampere (Tampere)
- 2019: Sheraton Detroit Novi (Detroit)
- 2023: Duluth Entertainment Convention Center (Duluth, Minnesota)
- 2024: Duluth Entertainment Convention Center (Duluth, Minnesota)
- 2025: Duluth Entertainment Convention Center (Duluth, Minnesota)
- 2026: Hilton Minneapolis (Minneapolis, Minnesota)
