= RAIT Financial Trust =

REIT owned by Fortress Investment Group

- Founded: August 1997; 28 years ago
- Headquarters: 130 West 42nd Street, New York City, United States
- Owner: Fortress Investment Group
- Website: www.rait.com

RAIT Financial Trust (Resource Asset Investment Trust) is a real estate investment trust owned by Fortress Investment Group that manages commercial real estate loans and properties. It is headquartered at 130 West 42nd Street, New York City.

== History ==
RAIT was founded in August 1997 by Resource America, Inc. at which time it was led by Betsy Z. Cohen.

In January 1998, the company became a public company via an initial public offering.

In December 2006, the company merged with Taberna Financial Realty Trust.

In August 2007, during the subprime mortgage crisis, the company suffered due to its exposure to American Home Mortgage.

In July 2009, the company sold its residential mortgage portfolio to Angelo Gordon for $15.8 million and took a $62 million loss on the sale.

In March 2014, Urban Retail Properties became a subsidiary of the company.

In November 2015, the company signed a lease to move its offices from the Cira Centre.

In May 2017, the company sold UBS Plaza for $14 million.

In December 2018, the company sold PlazAmericas.

In August 2019, after defaulting on its bonds, RAIT filed bankruptcy and agreed to be acquired by Fortress Investment Group for $174.4 million.

Magnetar Capital, a hedge fund, made a competing offer to acquire the company but the offer was rejected by a judge in December 2019.
