= Metropoint Tower =

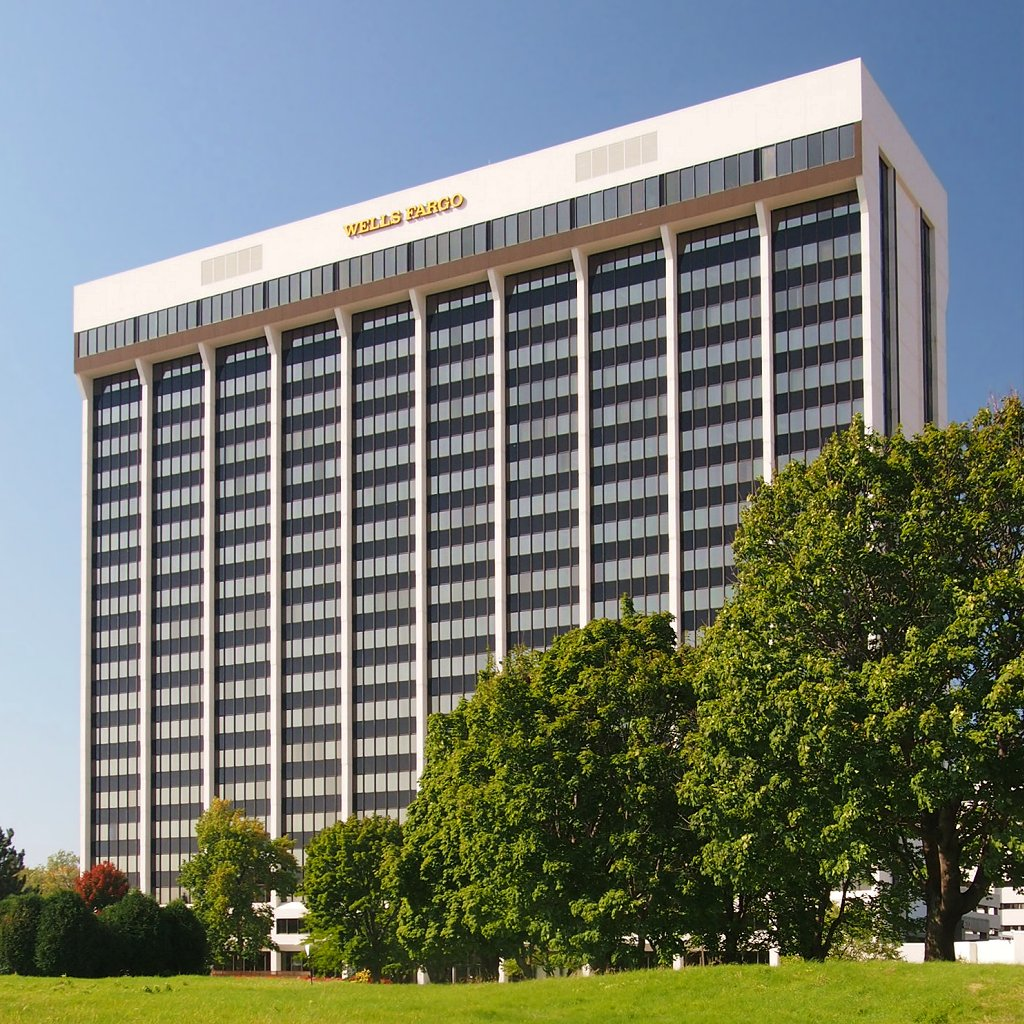
- Metropoint Tower from the northeast
- Interactive map of the Metropoint Tower area
- Alternative names: Interchange Building

General information
- Location: 600 Highway 169, St. Louis Park, Minnesota
- Coordinates: 44°58′30″N 93°24′10″W
- Completed: 1975

Height
- Height: 240 ft (73 m)

Design and construction
- Architects: James M. Cooperman & Associates
- Developer: Midwest Finance
- Main contractor: Bor-Son Construction Co.

The Metropoint Tower, otherwise known as 600 Interchange Tower, is a 20-story high rise office building located in St. Louis Park, Minnesota, United States. Originally known as Shelard Tower upon its completion in 1975, the tower is the tallest building within the 494/694 interstate beltway outside of Minneapolis or Saint Paul, Minnesota. Today it is part of an office complex known as the Metropoint, The Center For Business. It is the tallest building of the complex of four buildings which were built throughout the 1970s and early 1980s. The Metropoint Tower can be seen for miles around and is a highlight of the St. Louis Park skyline. James M. Cooperman & Associates designed the building and surrounding complex.

In 2007 BPG bought the entire Metropoint Complex for 86 million USD. In 2011, the building won the international TOBY (The office Building of the Year) award. The Building is considered class B office space. In October, 2012, Wells Fargo signed a lease for 478,000 feet of office space in the building.

On July 18, 2013, at 10:40 am, an explosion in the connected parking garage of the Metropoint Tower prompted an evacuation of about 800 people working in the building. No injuries were reported and the building was vacated for the remainder of the day.
