= First National Bank Building (Saint Paul, Minnesota) =

Skyscraper in downtown Saint Paul, Minnesota

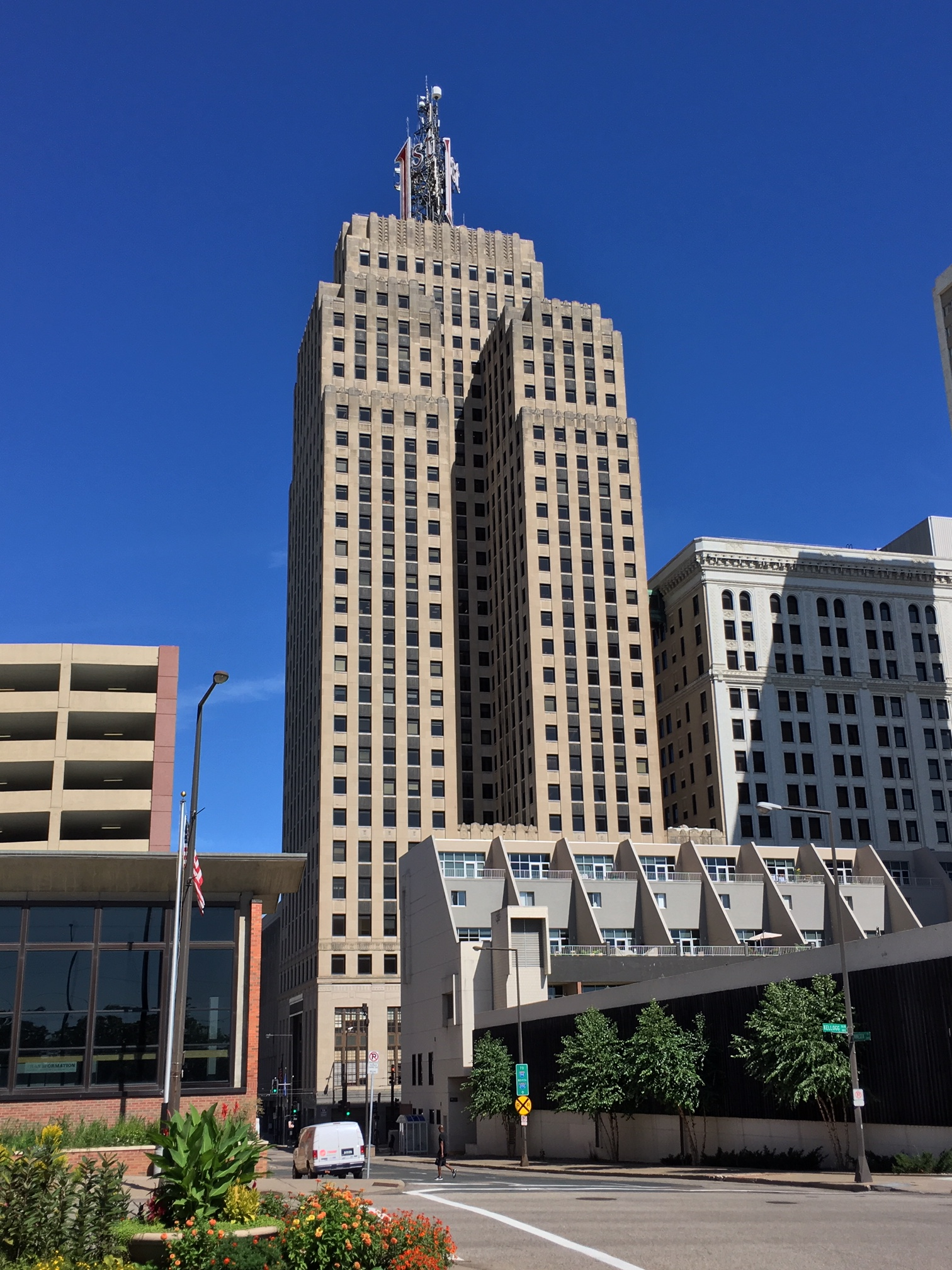
- The First National Bank Building in 2019

General information
- Status: Completed
- Location: 332 Minnesota Street, Saint Paul, Minnesota
- Coordinates: 44°56′48″N 93°05′28″W
- Completed: 1931

Height
- Roof: 417 ft (127 m)

Technical details
- Floor count: 32
- Floor area: 528,185 sq ft (49,070.0 m^{2})

Design and construction
- Architect: Graham, Anderson, Probst & White

The First National Bank Building is a 417-foot-tall high-rise building in downtown Saint Paul, Minnesota, United States. The building has the tallest connecting skyway in the Twin Cities. It is owned by the Downtown Revival Trust.

== Construction ==
The first building on the property, the Merchants Bank Building, was built in 1915 and opened in 1916. Rising 228 feet tall and with 16 stories, the building was the tallest in Saint Paul until it was overtaken by First National Bank. First National Bank was eventually surpassed by Wells Fargo Place. The First National Bank Building was designed by Graham, Anderson, Probst & White in 1931 after Merchants National Bank was absorbed by First National Bank. The 32-story structure struggled to acquire materials in 1930 due to the construction of the Empire State Building at the same time. In 1932 the cost of the building was $3,340,185.44.

== Building ==
=== Skyway ===
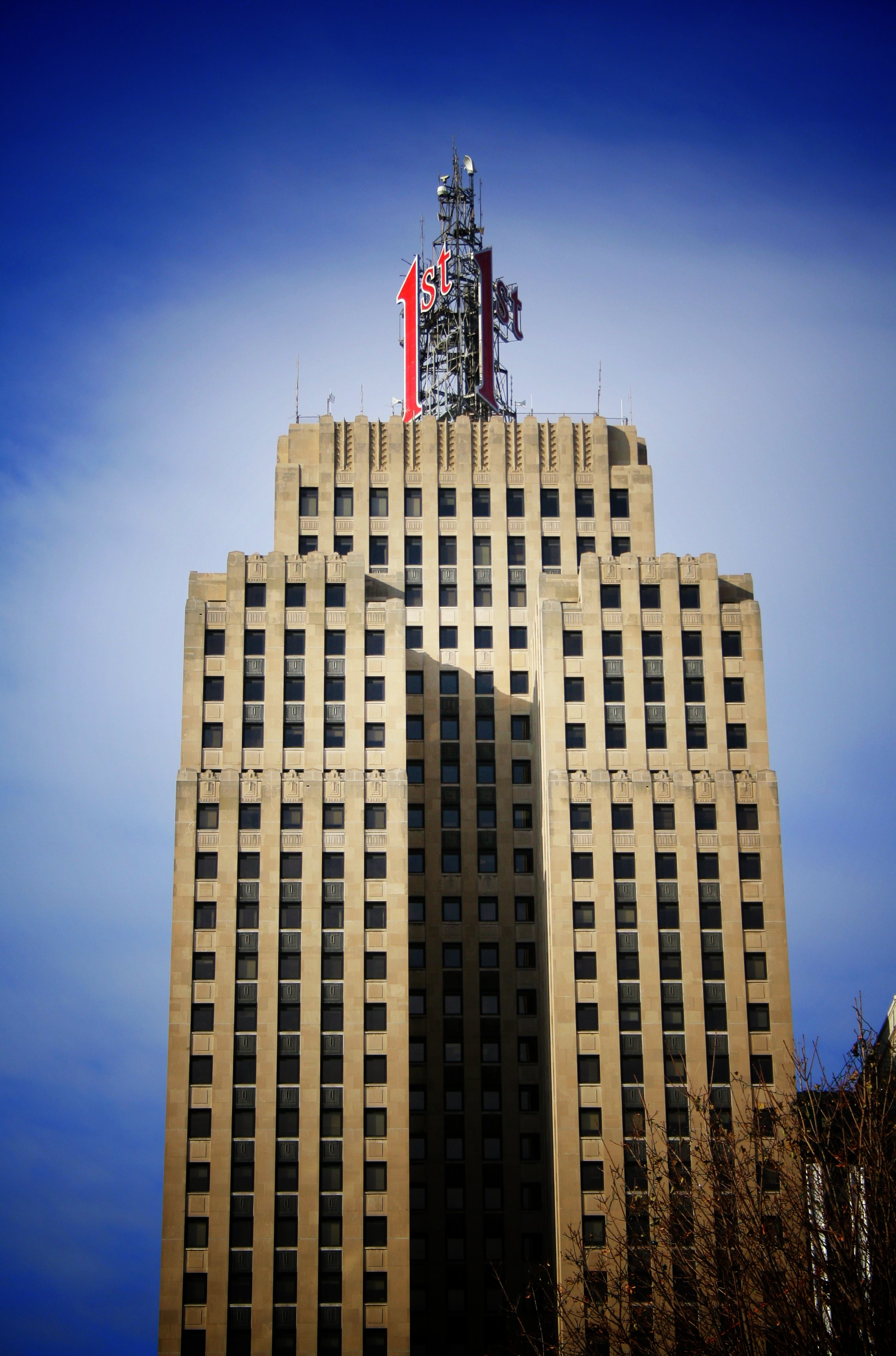
Unlit First National Bank sign

It is believed that the world's first modern skyway was built to connect the two towers. The skyway connects the building's 17th floor with the adjacent 16-story Merchants Bank Building, which is part of the same property. It is the Twin Cities' tallest skyway. The skyway with six tinted windows was built in 1931 in conjunction with the building. The Merchants Bank Building was the tallest in Saint Paul from 1915 to 1931, when the First National Bank Building overtook it.

=== Sign ===
The building is best known for the large neon red "1st" sign atop it. The sign has three sides and is 50 feet tall. In 1973, it was turned off in response to the energy crisis. It was relit ten years later after a major renovation. The original "vermillion vitreous porcelain edged [sign] with a double row of red neon tubes" was replaced with solely red tubes. Around 4,000 feet of neon tubing was used in the renovation. The sign can be seen from almost 75 miles away at night and 20 miles on a clear day.

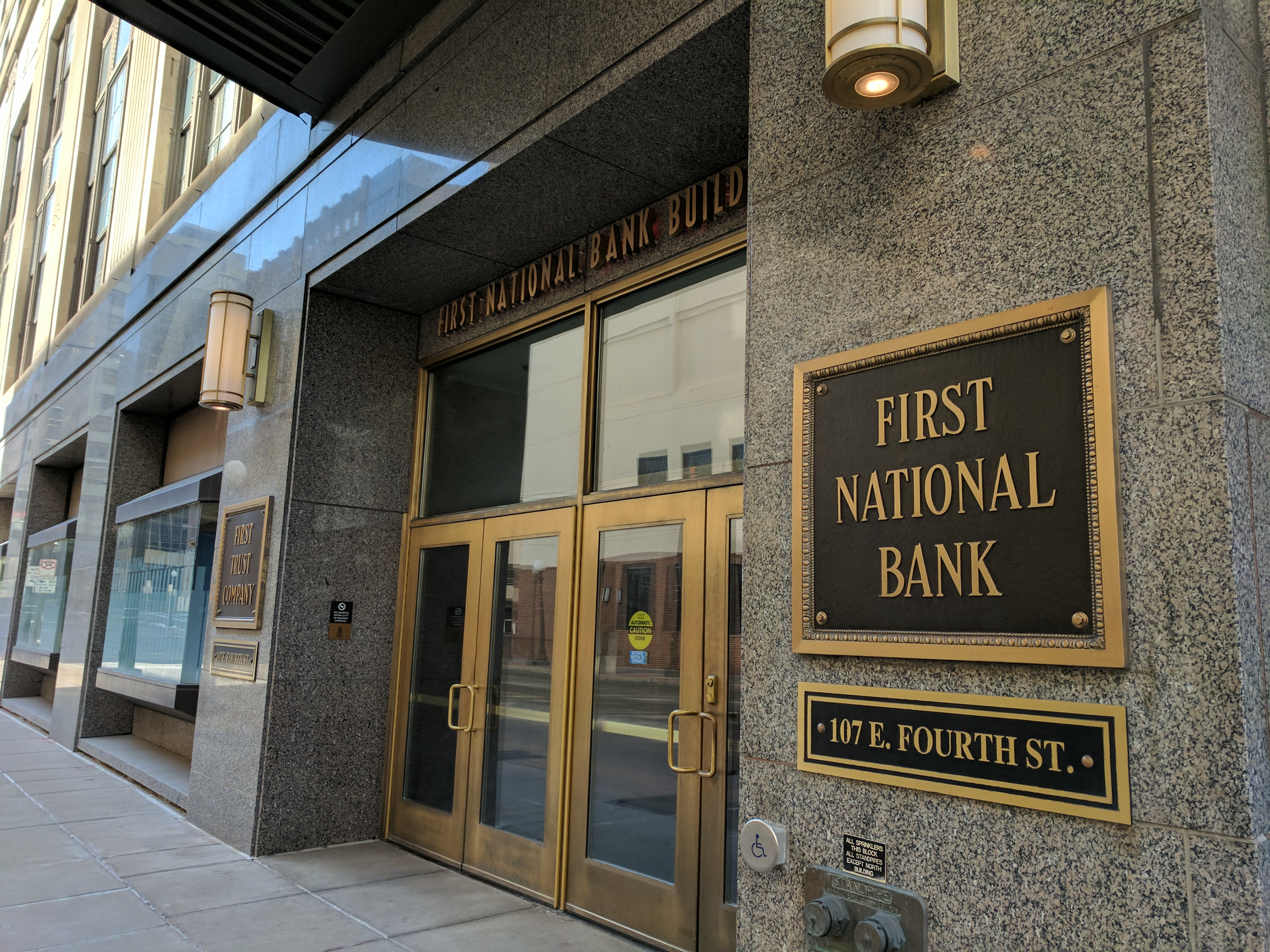
Entrance to the First National Bank Building

After renovation in 2016 due to wind damage, the sign was relit, with a color-changing LED sign. For the Winter Carnival in 2017, the sign changed color from neon red to icy blue. In 2017, the sign was changed to purple in honor of the first anniversary of musician Prince's death.

=== Building ===
An addition to the north was constructed in 1971, designed by Haarstick, Lundgren & Assoc.

The building is eligible for the National Register of Historic Places but not listed. Its overall design is Art Deco. The building was the tallest in Saint Paul from its construction in 1931 till 1986, when Galtier Plaza (now Cray Plaza) overtook it. It is now Saint Paul's third-tallest building, behind Jackson Tower of Cray Plaza and Wells Fargo Place (formerly the Minnesota World Trade Center).

The building was sold in 2007 to First National Building Holdings for an undisclosed amount. It was sold again in 2012 to an unknown organization. Three years later, it was sold to Madison Equities of St. Paul.

In 2026, investor Jamie Rand’s Downtown Revival Trust acquired the building. Rand plans to invest at least $7 million to update the building, including repairing the "1st" sign. Rand said he plans to activate the building's vacant ground-floor and skyway-level retail spaces. He also purchased the Great Northern Building in downtown St. Paul in 2026.

== See also ==
- List of tallest buildings in St. Paul

Preceded by Cathedral of Saint Paul	Tallest Building in Saint Paul; 1931—1986; 127 m	Succeeded by Galtier Plaza
