= UBS Plaza =

- Interactive map of the UBS Plaza area

General information
- Status: Completed
- Type: Office
- Location: 444 Cedar Street; St. Paul, Minnesota
- Coordinates: 44°56′53.42″N 93°5′39.67″W
- Completed: 1980
- Owner: CIG-UBS

Height
- Height: 305 feet (93 m)

Technical details
- Floor count: 25
- Floor area: 229,600 square feet (21,330 m^{2})

Design and construction
- Architecture firm: Skidmore, Owings & Merrill

UBS Plaza is a 25-story high-rise office building in downtown St. Paul, Minnesota. The building was completed in 1980 as part of the Town Square mixed-use complex. It is occupied by UBS Financial Services, architecture/engineering firm TKDA, and several law firms.

== History ==
The building was completed in 1980 and originally named the Conwed Tower. After the Meritor Mortgage Corporation moved into the top two floors of the towers in 1987, it was renamed to Meritor Tower. The tower was originally owned by a consortium of limited partnerships, but the Saint Paul Port Authority was forced to take over in 1991 after a lawsuit revealed financial issues. The tower was renamed to Piper Jaffray Plaza after Piper Jaffray moved its offices into the building in 1993.

It was sold to RAIT Financial Trust in 2012 and acquired by CIG-UBS in 2017 for $14 million.

=== MPR Raccoon ===
On June 12, 2018, a stranded raccoon climbed to the 22nd story of the tower and became an internet sensation, attracting onlookers while animal control attempted to trap it. The raccoon's climb was livestreamed online and was covered by local television stations. The raccoon reached the roof of the 25-story building at 2:30 a.m. the following morning. The name "MPR Raccoon" was attributed to Minnesota Public Radio employees who worked across the street.

== See also ==
- List of tallest buildings in St. Paul
