= Skyline Tower =

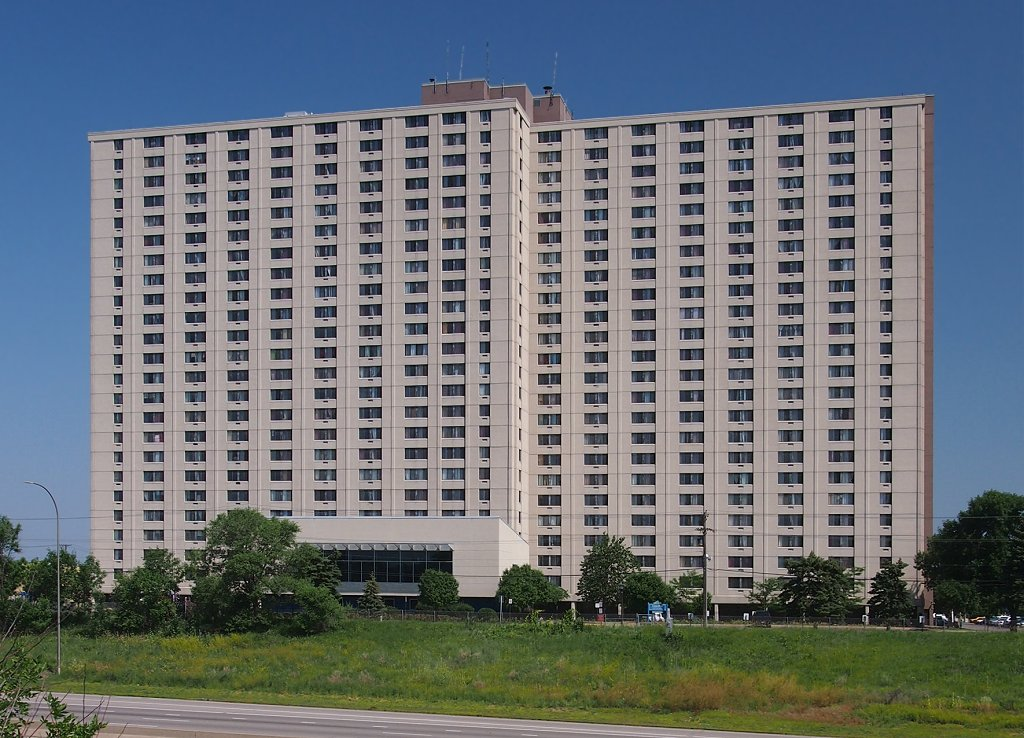
- Skyline Tower overlooking Interstate 94
- Interactive map of the Skyline Tower area

General information
- Type: Apartments
- Location: 1247 St. Anthony Ave., Saint Paul, Minnesota
- Coordinates: 44°57′09″N 93°09′10″W
- Construction started: 1970
- Completed: 1971
- Opening: September 1971

Height
- Roof: 240 feet (73 m)

Technical details
- Floor count: 24

Design and construction
- Architect: Cerny Associates
- Developer: Bor-Son Construction Co.

Skyline Tower is a large low-income high rise apartment complex in Saint Paul, Minnesota, United States. The building is also often called St. Anthony Tower, or 1247 St. Anthony. At 240 feet (73 m) it is the largest single HUD-subsidized building in Minnesota, and the 22nd-tallest building in Saint Paul. With over 500 units it is the largest single-building subsidized housing complex in the U.S. west of Chicago. The building is run by CommonBond Communities, the largest developer or owner of affordable rental housing in Minnesota. The nonprofit bought the building in 2000 with the help of U.S. Bank. The building was previously owned by Skyline Towers Co and managed by Sentinel Management Co.

== History ==
Skyline Tower opened in 1971 as part of HUD's section 236 program. It was then sold to private owners, converting to federally subsidized housing. The owner, Sentinel Management, struggled to address drug problems, crime, and a deteriorating building. A series of fires in 1998–1999 led to an increased push for sprinkler systems. Service agencies also struggled to provide services to the building's low-income residents, often running out money before long-term change could be enacted. In 1991 an attempt to evict drug users and problem tenants significantly lowered the building’s occupancy levels. Occupancy was boosted from 60% to 95%, creating more money for maintenance concerns. However, by 2000 the 1986 exterior installation and finishing was failing, the 1970s appliances, cabinets and plumbing were in need of refurbishing and common space was limited. Finding itself unable to finance the necessary major improvements and wishing to avoid tearing down the building, Sentinel Management agreed to sell the property to affordable housing non-profit CommonBond Communities in 2005.

During the 1990s most of the residents of Skyline Toweres were very poor. In 1997 the average resident's annual household income was $6,738, which was then roughly 15% of the United States average. In 1995 residents spoke over twenty different languages. The number of residents also varied. Low numbers were around 850 residents when there was a 71% occupancy rate to 2,000 residents.

Due to its high concentration of poverty, the building was characterized in a 1993 paper "as a ghetto tipped on its edge". As a result of this characterization and the building's residents at the time, Skyline Towers was often referred to during that decade as a "ghetto in the sky" or specifically as The Ghetto in the Sky. Of the building's 506 units, 451 were federally subsidized. Partially as a result of the high rate of poverty, there were often high levels of crime. In 1994, there were 643 police calls to the building. The stairways were also closed due to security concerns. In 1996 the building's operator paid $150,000 a year to contract an outside security firm. In 1996 the building received a federal grant to install a high tech security system to lower crime. The system also allowed only one person to enter the building at a time.

== Renovation and new residents ==
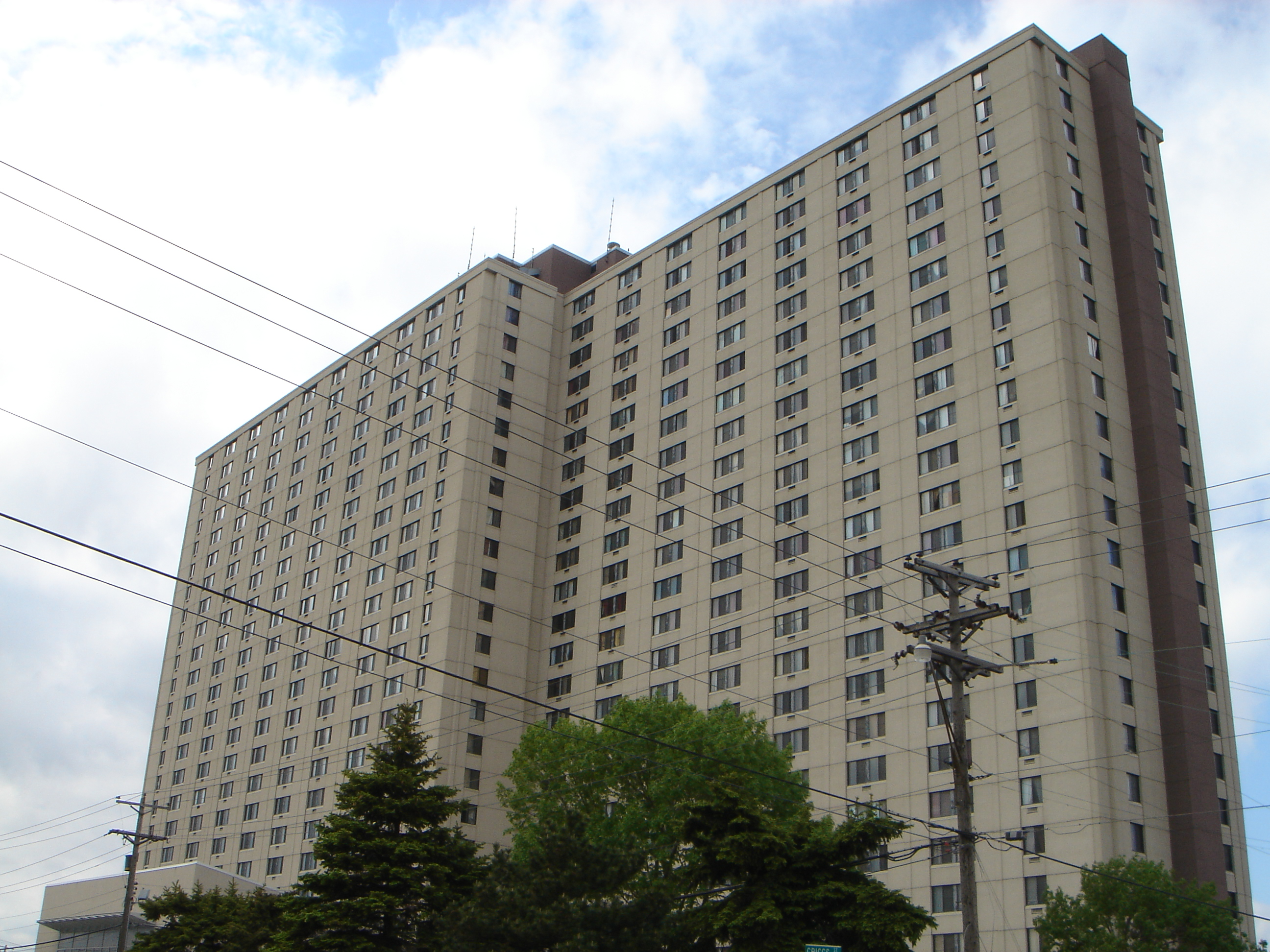
Skyline Tower from the sidewalk

In 2000, $31.3 million was raised by CommonBond Communities to buy and renovate the building. The money came from a variety of sources including the City of Saint Paul, HUD, Ramsey County, U.S. Bancorp, CommonBond Communities, Sentinel Management Co and the Minnesota Housing Finance Agency. $15.2 million was used for renovation and the rest to purchase the building. Ramsey County contributed $10 million in tax-exempt bonds, the first time the county contributed to a project of this type The rehabilitation repaired the crumbling exterior, added sprinkler systems and replaced outdated appliances and plumbing. It also added on a service center which is run and funded by CommonBond and designed to improve the skills and earning capacity of residents.

The change of ownership and structural renovation is credited with improving the building. Since then the building has seen an influx of Somali residents. As a results of its large new immigrant population, Skyline Tower's nickname has also changed to United Nations of the Sky. A history of the tower, Skyline Tower, 'Ghetto in the Sky': Race, Class, and Housing in the Twin Cities was written by Michael D. Galvin and published in 2009.

== See also ==
- List of tallest buildings in St. Paul
- Skyline Tower's Web Page
- CommonBond Communities
