= Cray Plaza =

Building in Saint Paul, Minnesota, U.S.

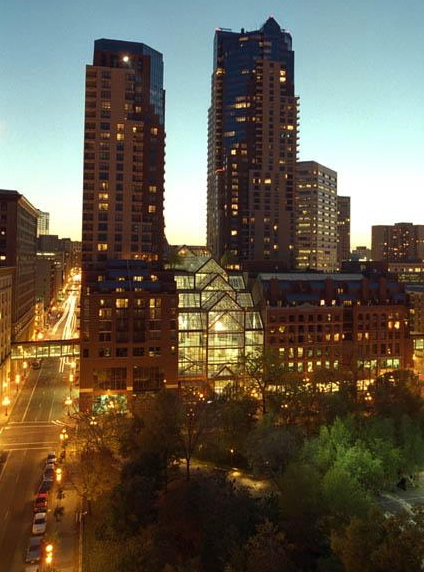
- Exterior of Cray Plaza, as seen from Mears Park
- Alternative names: Galtier Plaza

General information
- Status: Completed
- Location: 380 Jackson Street, Saint Paul, Minnesota, U.S.
- Coordinates: 44°56′55.08″N 93°5′21.55″W
- Completed: 1986

Height
- Roof: 443 ft (135 m)

Technical details
- Floor count: 46

Other information
- Public transit: Metro Transit; Green at Union Depot

Cray Plaza (formerly Galtier Plaza), located in the Lowertown neighborhood of Saint Paul, Minnesota, United States, opened in 1986. Features include 365 apartments, 121 luxury condominiums, 16 townhomes, 192,000 square feet (17,800 m^{2}) of retail and restaurant space, 100,000 square feet (9,300 m^{2}) of office space, and a 5-level underground parking garage for 829 cars.

== History ==
At that time the Lowertown Redevelopment Corporation, a non-profit coordinator of development in St. Paul's historic warehouse district, had sought to fill Block 40 for some three years. The site on Mears Park just east of the downtown business district represented the keystone in Lowertown's revitalization, and Lowertown Redevelopment Corporation's executive director Weiming Lu had persuaded developers with the concept of a mixed-use development and one tenant, the downtown YMCA.

Efforts to put together a project reusing existing properties on the block had fallen through, as had a modest proposal for housing and service retail by the Carley Capital Group of Madison, Wisconsin. The city had already secured an Urban Development Action Grant (UDAG) from the federal government for the Carley development, and called for new developers with a three-month deadline looming. Boisclair and Omni Venture, Ltd. the developers of Minneapolis' International Market Square, responded. Robert Boisclair took on the development.

Miller, Hanson, Westerbeck & Bell were selected as architects for the project. They had done studies of Block 40 for the Lowertown Corporation and had a history of designing housing for Boisclair which included Lakepoint Tower and the Falls and Pinnacle at Riverplace. Galtier Plaza was named after Father Lucien Galtier, a Roman Catholic priest who has historical involvement with the founding of the city of St. Paul.

In the summer of 2009 it was announced that the naming rights to Galtier Plaza had been purchased, and the building would become known as Cray Plaza, as the building's then new "anchor" tenant was Cray Inc. The complex won the award for the first place design award excellence from Development Design Group, First Place from National Mall Monitor Center's of Excellence, and Signs of the Times award for electric sign graphics.

== Design ==
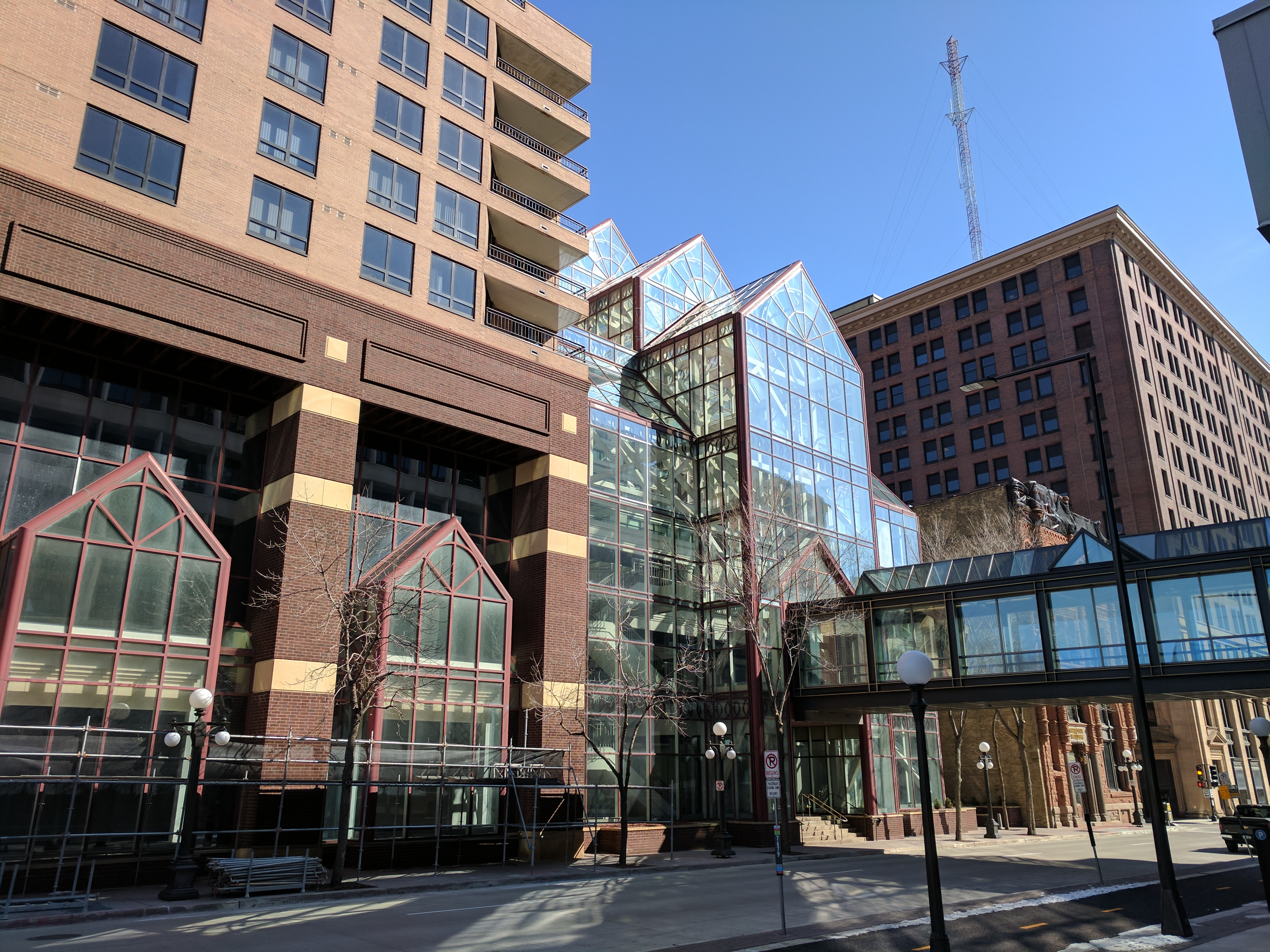
Exterior of the Cray Plaza atrium

The location and form of the architectural elements was the subject of negotiation between the developer, the city and Lowertown Corporation. In addition, the financial partnerships involved in the project had to be expressed architecturally so that ownership of the complex space could be divided by multiple tenants.

The six-story base along the street front was needed to maintain the cornice of the surrounding six-story buildings and was dictated by both historic and design considerations. The decision to fill out the block to its fullest extent met economic goals. The housing, proposed as one corner tower cascading to the base, was instead split between two towers. The taller one, the Jackson Tower, falls just under Federal Aviation Administration limits at 452 feet (138 m). The lower one, the Sibley Tower, is located 60 feet (18 m) back of the Mears Park facade.

The atrium beginning at the building line, became instead a gabled roof extruded beyond the building facade and stepping back to its seven-story peak. The developer wanted it to be 120 feet (37 m) wide but it was narrowed to 90 feet. The skyway linking Galtier Plaza and the Farm Credit Bank toward downtown was proposed as a "festive" design with gabled peaks, much glass, and cream and red aluminum trim to match Galtier's. Lowertown's Weiming Lu and the city planning staff stood fast for the standard Vierendeel truss and bronze aluminum. Galtier Plaza opened in 1986.

== Project difficulties ==
The project cost at least $140 million to build, not including the YMCA and other portions. Various parts of the project were funded separately. The rental apartments were funded by bonds sold through the Port Authority to private institutional investors; the YMCA was on a separate parcel; and much of the other private funding came from investors as equity and from Chemical Bank as a loan. There were issues with construction, cost overruns, inadequate financial resources, high interest rates, delays, and strategic errors made in market analysis and design.

As the project was delayed, it found difficulty attracting tenants. Eventually, private investors are said to have lost about $42 to $45 million in equity and Chemical Bank is said to have lost about $90 million on their loan. The Port Authority took over the rental apartments after the default on that part of the project—for which they had loaned $32 million and which would have cost about $36 million.

Excluding the YMCA, rental housing, and the energy plant, the balance of the project (retail, offices, condos, and the parking garage) was sold in 1989 to a Canadian investor in the range of $10 to $12 million.

Henry Zaidan's thought to market the condos, and to reposition the retail space from the regional high end target and toward services for the neighborhood and downtown. He relocated the food court to the ground level. After filling the vacant retail and office space during the recession, Zaidan left the Galtier Plaza project in 1992, and in 1996 the holder of the mortgage obtained title through foreclosure, changed the management company and made some nominal improvements before selling Galtier in 1999 to an investor group managed by Wasmer, Schroeder & Company.

The Wasmer group invested in an extensive remodeling project, including conversion of much of the vacant retail space into office space. The residential towers at Galtier were sold to Bigos Investments, owned by Ted Bigos, in 2003, and the Wasmer group sold the commercial and parking facilities in 2006 to a group based in California. The commercial portion of Galtier containsed several restaurants, a convenience store, a conference facility, and a credit union, Unity One Credit Union. Retail and office space were about 85% occupied.

== Occupancy ==
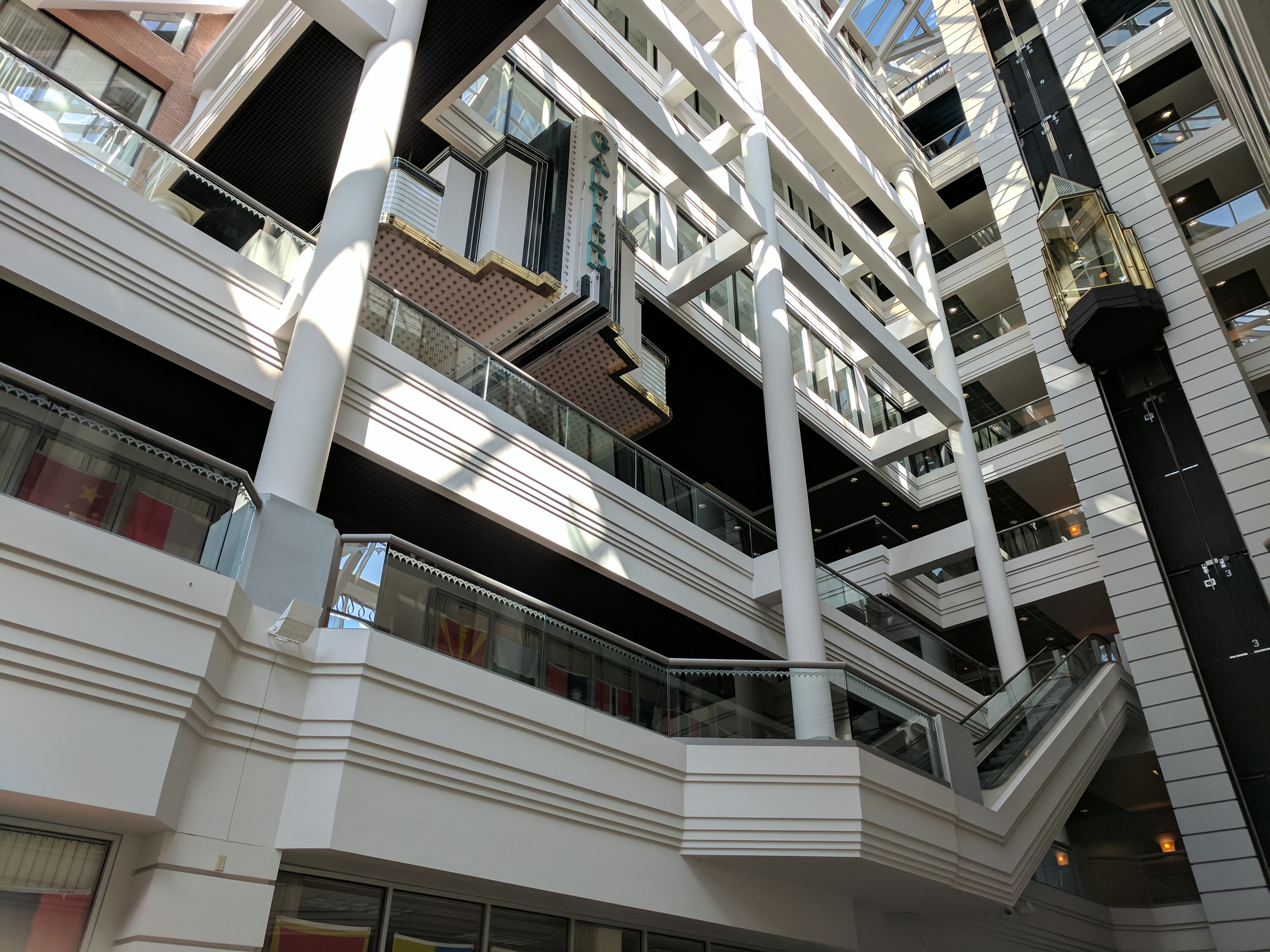
Interior of the Cray Plaza building atrium

Over the years, the building has seen sporadic success, first as a shopping mall, then as an entertainment center, with restaurants and a food court. In 2019, Bigos Properties acquired the retail portion, and plans on converting the space into residential apartments. As of 2024, the space remains empty due to construction delays from the COVID-19 pandemic. The former site of the YMCA has been converted to amenities for the residents of the plaza and sister properties.

== See also ==
- List of tallest buildings in Minnesota
- List of tallest buildings in St. Paul

Preceded by First National Bank Building	Tallest Building in Saint Paul; 1986—1987; 138 m	Succeeded by Wells Fargo Place
