= Pioneer and Endicott Buildings =

Buildings in Saint Paul, Minnesota

- U.S. National Register of Historic Places
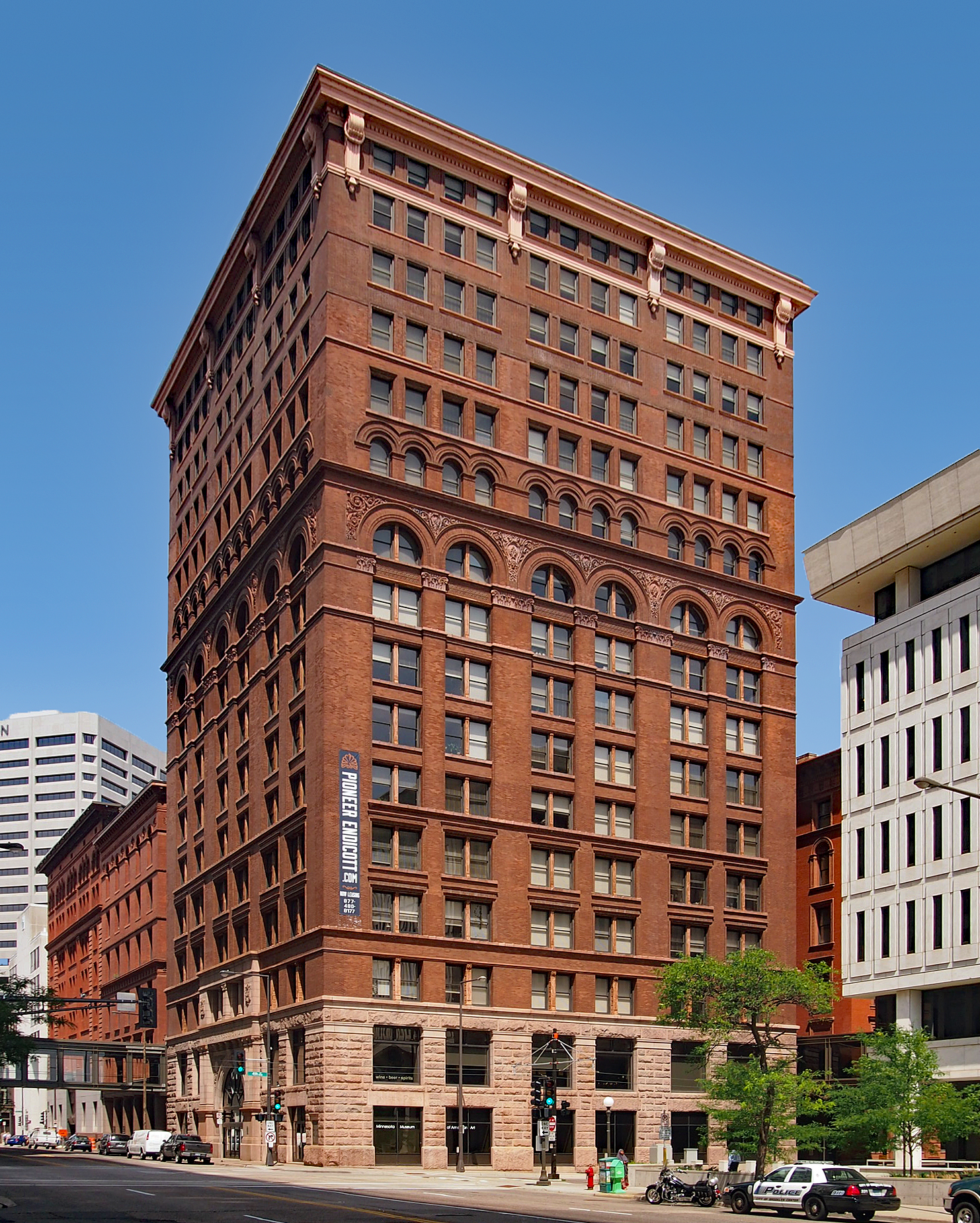
- The Pioneer Building flanked by the Endicott Building
- Interactive map of Pioneer and Endicott Buildings
- Location: 141 4th St E, Saint Paul, Minnesota
- Coordinates: 44°56′49″N 93°5′24″W
- Built: 1889-1890
- Architect: Solon Spencer Beman, Cass Gilbert
- Architectural style: Renaissance, Romanesque
- NRHP reference No.: 74001038
- Added to NRHP: July 10, 1974

The Pioneer and Endicott Buildings are two adjoining office and apartment buildings located between downtown and Lowertown Saint Paul, Minnesota. The 1890-built Endicott building forms an L-shape around the 1889-built Pioneer Building. The Endicott building was designed by Cass Gilbert, architect of the Minnesota State Capitol, and James Knox Taylor. The Pioneer Building was designed by Solon Spencer Beman in the Romanesque style and was the first building in the United States to have a glass elevator. Connected in the 1940s, they are together listed in the National Register of Historic Places. At the time of its construction, the Pioneer Building was the tallest building west of Chicago, and remained the tallest in Saint Paul until 1915 when the Cathedral of Saint Paul was constructed.

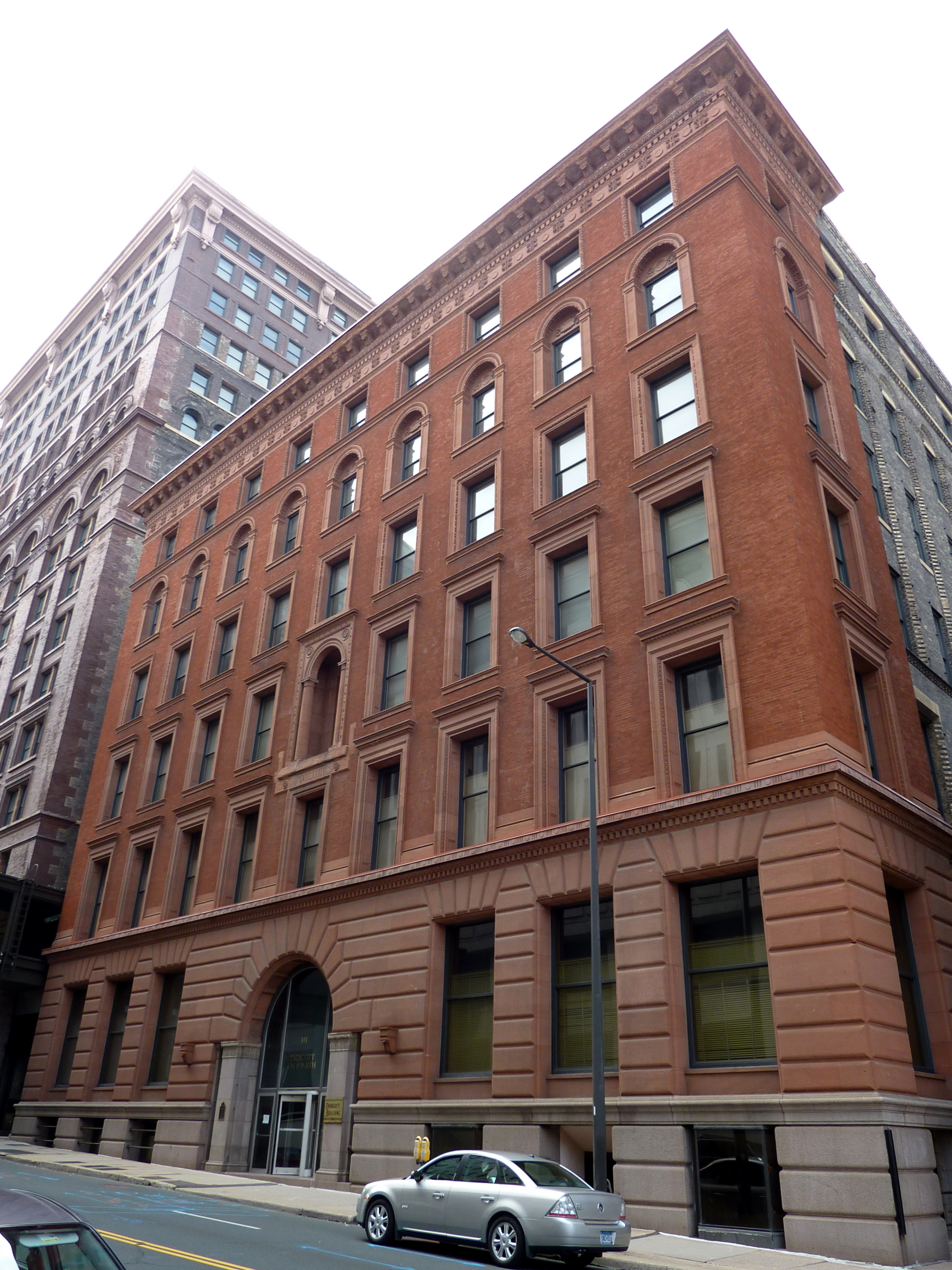
Endicott Building as seen from 4th Street

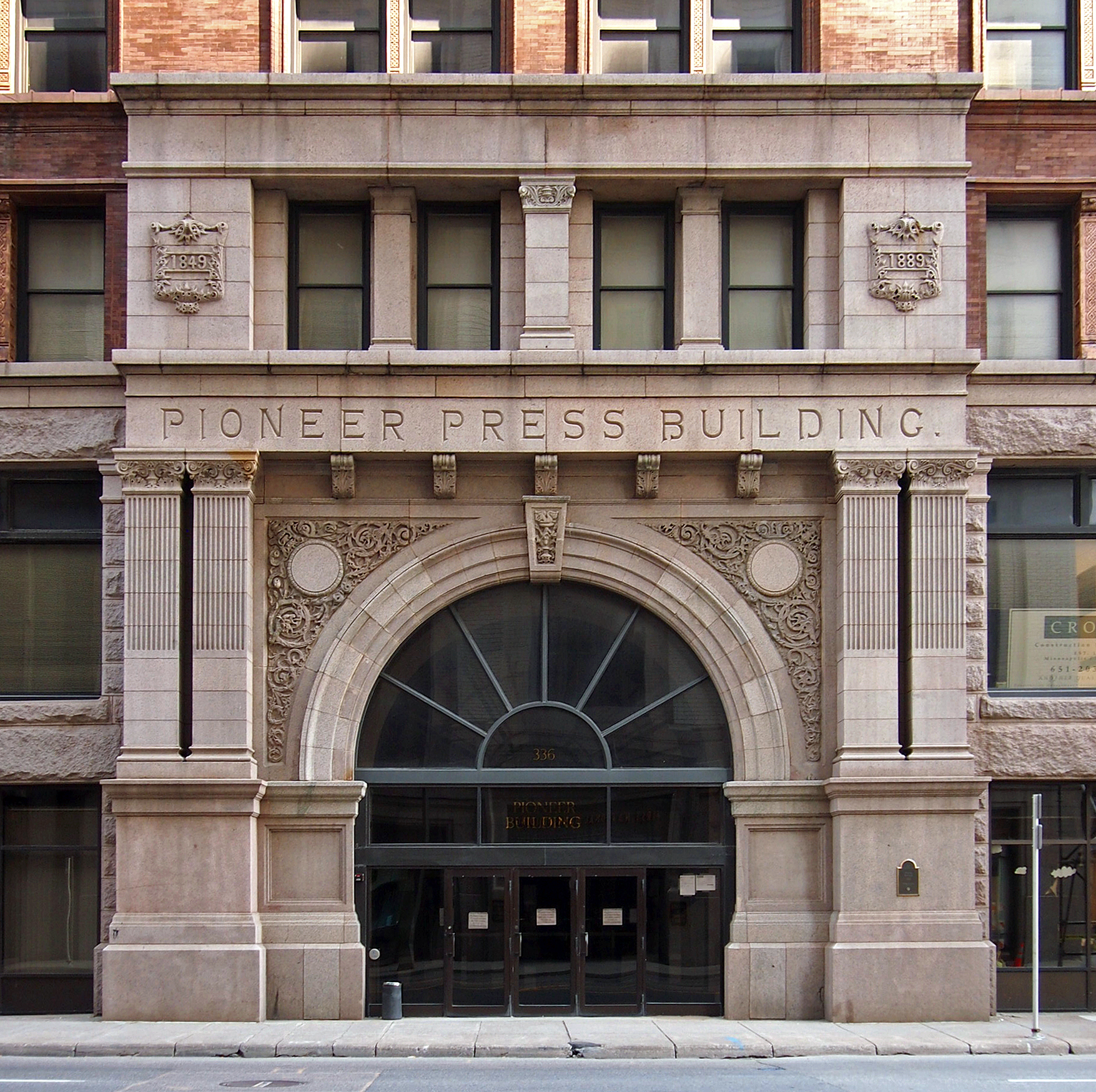
Main entry of the Pioneer Building

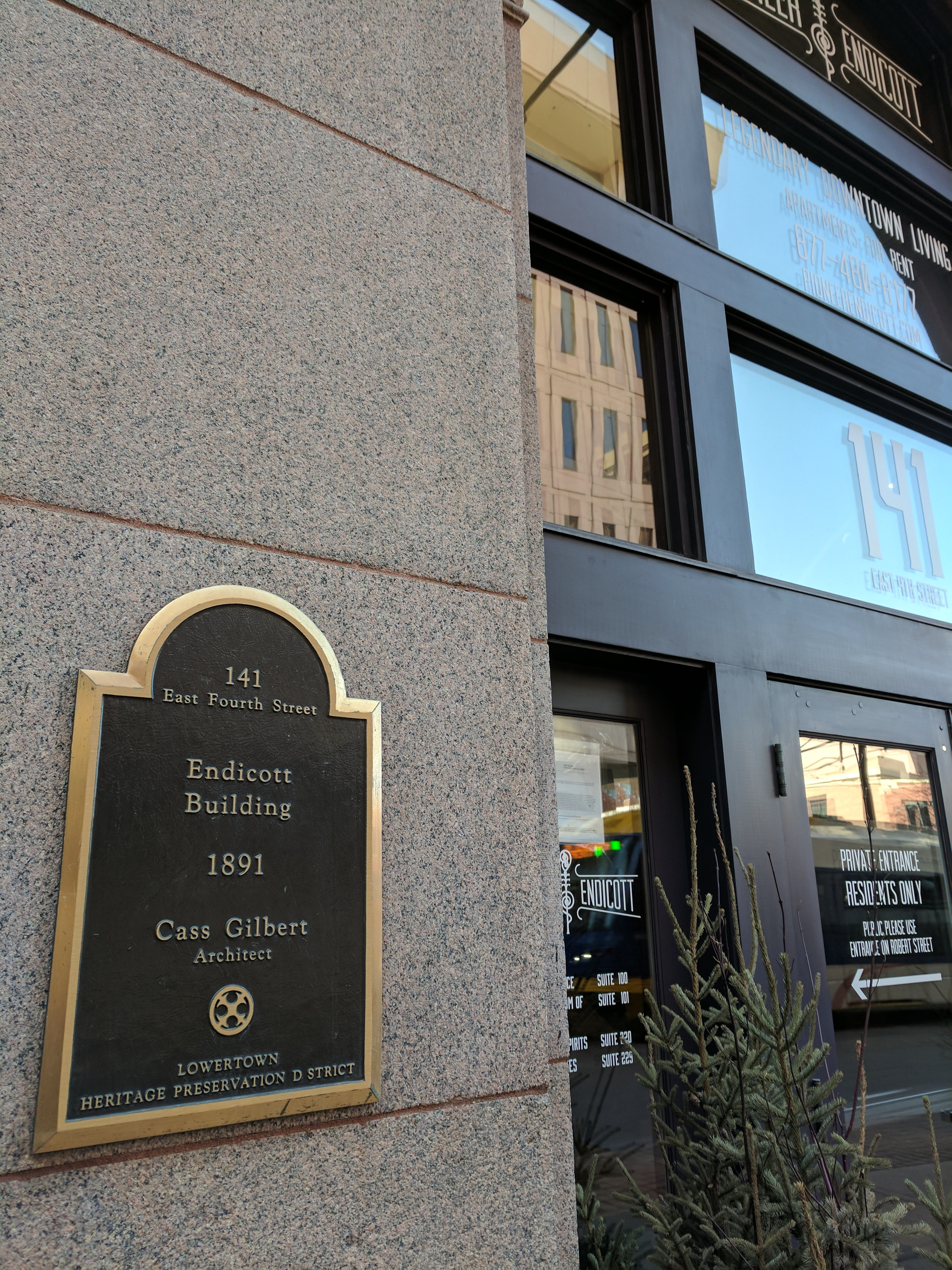
Plaque at the 4th Street entrance of the Endicott Building
