= Hilton Minneapolis =

- Interactive map of the Hilton Minneapolis area

General information
- Location: Minneapolis, Minnesota, 1001 Marquette Avenue South
- Coordinates: 44°58′21.9″N 93°16′23.8″W
- Completed: 1992
- Owner: Walton Street Capital

Technical details
- Floor count: 25

Design and construction
- Main contractor: Kraus-Anderson Companies

The Hilton Minneapolis in Minneapolis, on Marquette Avenue between 10th and 11th Street South. The hotel is known for its entrance with floor-to-ceiling windows, crystal chandeliers, marble floors and a custom art collection featuring Minnesota landmarks by Minnesota artists. It has 821 rooms and is 25 stories tall. It has a 25,000-square-foot ballroom and 35 meeting rooms. It is the largest hotel in the state of Minnesota.

The hotel was built in 1992. DiamondRock Hospitality purchased it in 2010 for $152 million and sold it in 2016 to Walton Street Capital for $143 million.

== See also ==
- List of tallest buildings in Minneapolis
