= The Pointe of St. Paul =

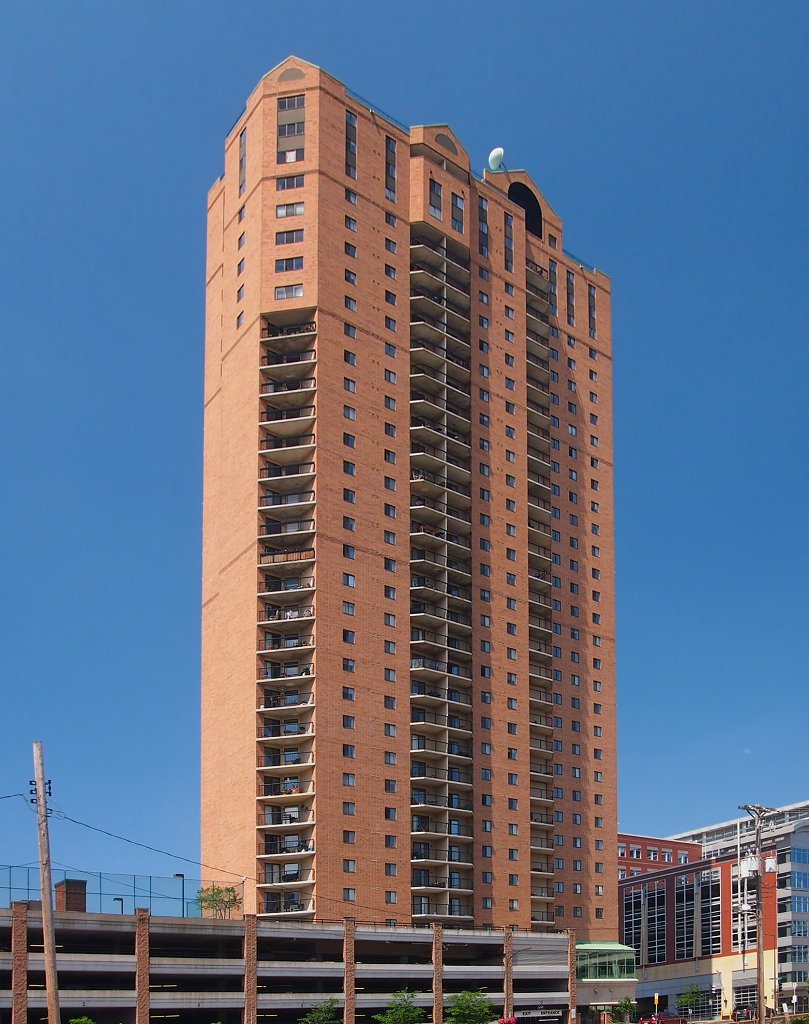
- The Pointe of St. Paul from the east
- Interactive map of the The Pointe of St. Paul area

General information
- Status: Completed
- Location: 78 10th Street East, Saint Paul, Minnesota
- Coordinates: 44°57′01″N 93°05′45″W
- Completed: 1988

Height
- Roof: 340 ft (100 m)

Technical details
- Floor count: 34

The Pointe of St. Paul is a condominium high-rise located in downtown St. Paul, Minnesota, United States. It was completed in 1988. It is 340 feet (100 meters)) tall and has 34 floors. There is no 13th floor. It was originally constructed as an apartment highrise. It was converted to owner occupied condominiums in early 2003. The building features 290 residential units, which are a mixture of studio, one and two bedroom units. The building has an attached parking garage for residents, both above and below ground and there is visitor parking in the garage.
