= Wells Fargo Place =

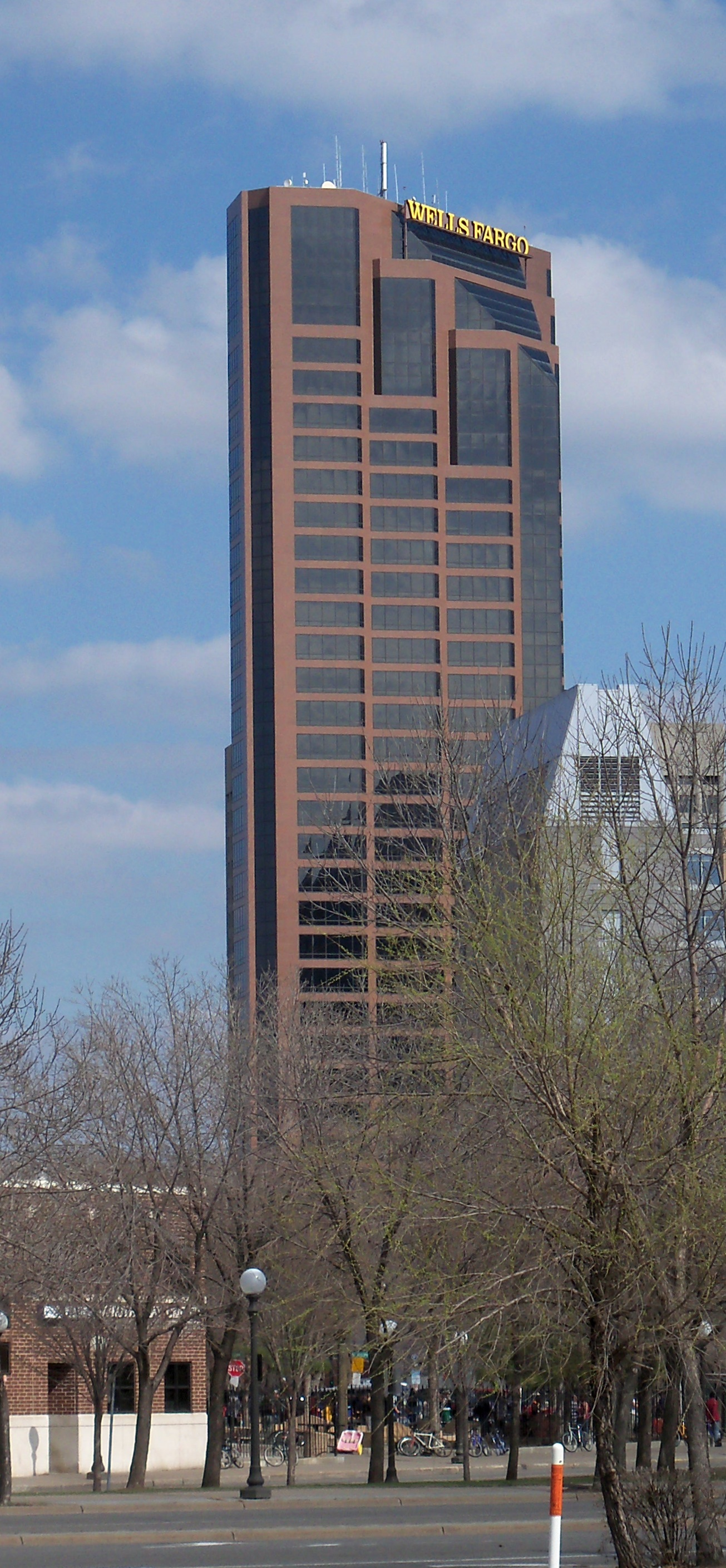
- Interactive map of the Wells Fargo Place area
- Alternative names: Minnesota World Trade Center

General information
- Status: Completed
- Type: Office
- Location: 30 East 7th Street, Saint Paul, Minnesota
- Coordinates: 44°56′53″N 93°5′45″W
- Construction started: 1985
- Completed: September 1987
- Opening: September 11, 1987
- Cost: $100+ million
- Owner: Unilev Capital Corp

Height
- Antenna spire: 471 ft (144 m)

Technical details
- Floor count: 37
- Floor area: 634,888 sq ft (58,983.0 m^{2})

Design and construction
- Architects: Winsor/Faricy Architects, Inc. and WZMH Architects
- Developer: Oxford Properties
- Main contractor: PCL

Website
- wellsfargoplace.com

Wells Fargo Place (30 East 7th Street) is an office tower in St. Paul, Minnesota, United States. It stands at 471 feet (144 m) tall, and is currently the tallest building in St. Paul. It was designed by Winsor/Faricy Architects, Inc. and WZMH Architects, and is 37 stories tall. The building opened in September 1987, a month ahead of schedule and under budget. It is a concrete and steel structure, with a facade of brown-colored granite and glass. The granite came from Finland. The building contains 156 underground parking spaces. It was formerly known as The Minnesota World Trade Center. Anthrosphere, a large sculpture by Paul Granlund, is in the lobby.

The tower houses offices used by Wells Fargo, who renamed the building Wells Fargo Place on May 15, 2003. It also houses the headquarters of the Minnesota State Colleges and Universities System. The building was designed for the 36th and 37th floors to be used as a restaurant with a dedicated elevator between the floors. While built to design, including the dedicated elevator, this was never implemented and the space was divided up into storage lockers that are listed for lease on their website.

The building was developed by Oxford Properties Inc, the design architect was WZMH, the general contractor was PCL, and the permanent lender was Principal of Des Moines, Iowa. Windsor Faricy was the local production architect.

== Tenants ==
- AgriBank
- Arch Insurance Group
- Microsoft
- Minnesota State Colleges and Universities System - Suite 350
- Merrill Lynch
- Internal Revenue Service
- Wells Fargo
- Video Update (1986–2001)

== Broadcasting ==
=== FM ===
FM radio stations
Frequency	Call sign	Name	Format	Owner
92.1	W221BS (WDGY-AM Translator)	74 WDGY	Oldies	Borgen Broadcasting

== See also ==
- List of tallest buildings in Minnesota

Preceded by Galtier Plaza	Tallest Building in Saint Paul; 1987—Present; 144 m	Succeeded by None
