= Augustana Lutheran Church (Minneapolis) =

Church in Minneapolis, Minnesota

Coordinates: 44°58′13″N 93°15′28″W

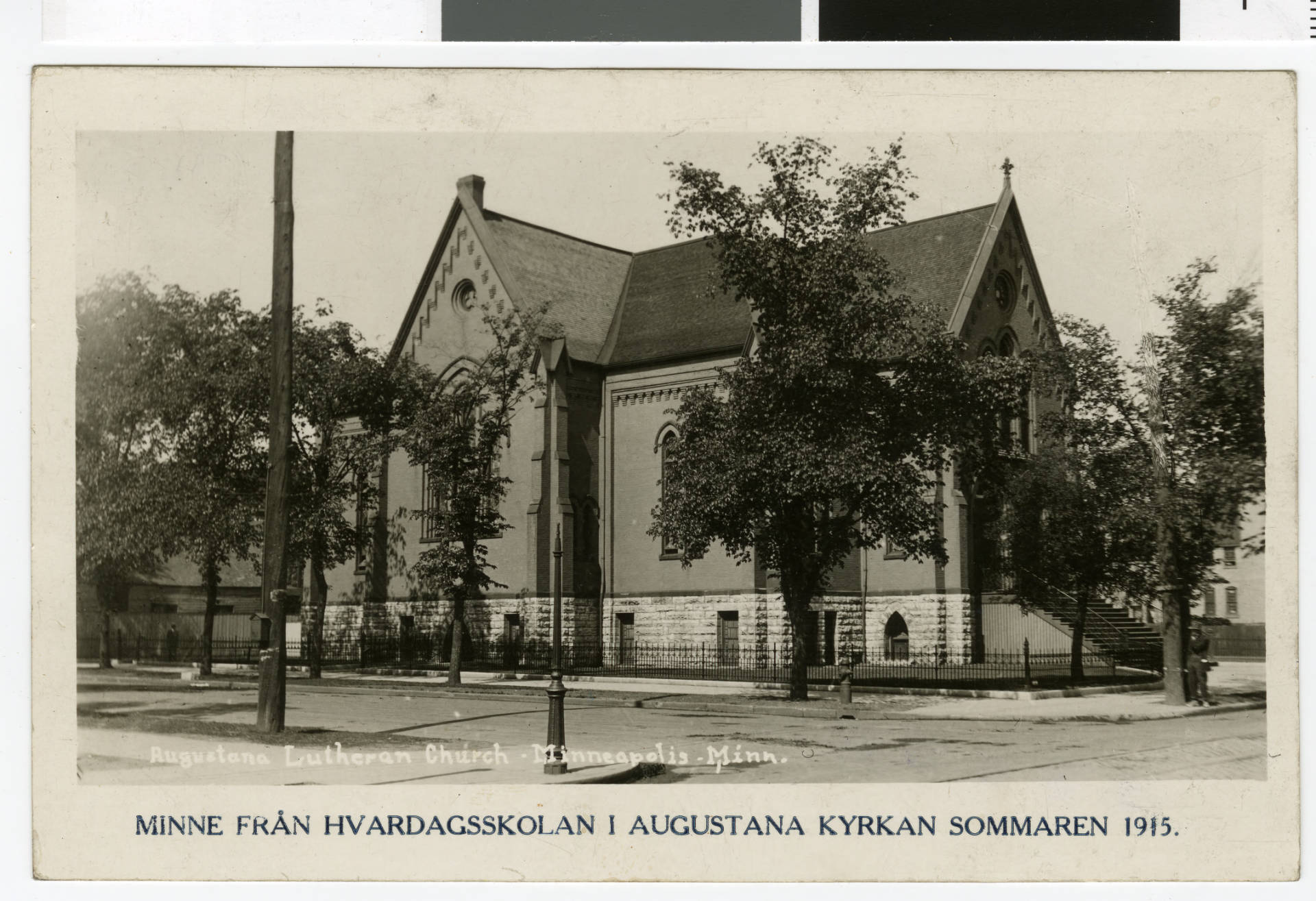
Augustana Lutheran Church in 1915

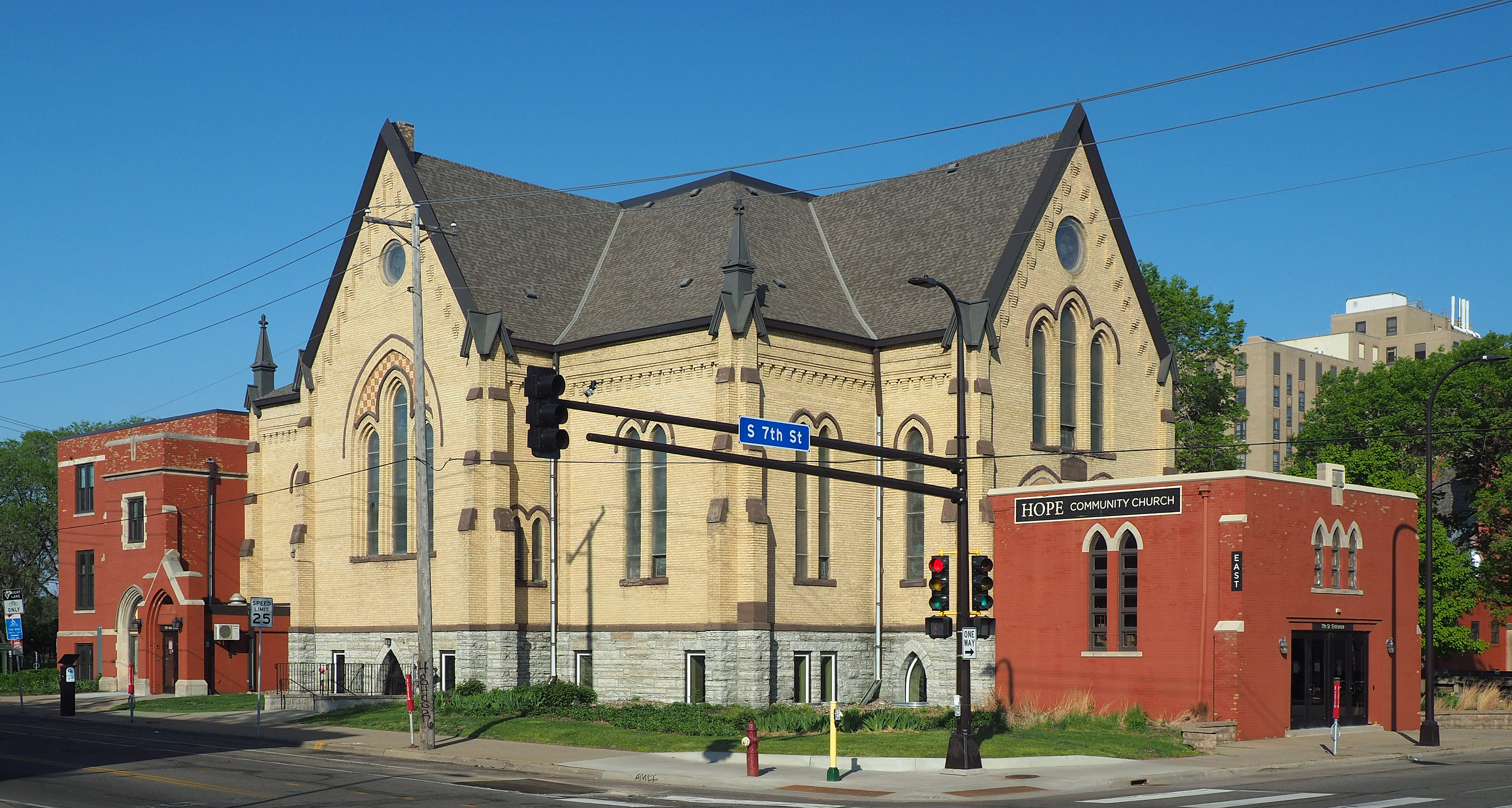
The building as Hope Community Church East, with 20th-century additions

Augustana Lutheran Church is a church in the Elliot Park neighborhood of Minneapolis, built in the Gothic Revival style. Architect William H. Dennis built the church in 1883. The church building, located 704 11th Ave. S., was home to many Scandinavian parishioners in the early decades of existence. The church initially served a large immigrant population in the city of Minneapolis, and the congregation often heard from pastors who traveled from Sweden and Norway. As the downtown population changed, the church congregants also shifted. By the 1960s, many Lutherans attended newer churches in suburban Twin Cities neighborhoods. By 2014, the church had fewer than 100 members, who sold the building.

The church was built of yellow brick with red brick accents. The sanctuary was built to be illuminated by the tall, narrow stained glass windows. The 800-seat sanctuary features a curved balcony and the pipes of a 1904 Estey organ (though the actual organ was replaced in 1955 by M.P. Moller). The architect of the building was known for French Renaissance Revival works in Minnesota, including the Vendome Hotel on the corner of Fourth Street and Nicollet Avenue in Minneapolis.

Several additions were added onto the original structure throughout the 1940s–1970s. The building's block consists only of one other building: another large brick church on the northwest corner. Both are surrounded by parking lots.

Hope Community Church owns both buildings and the parking lots. Hope, a church that started in 1996, is affiliated with the Evangelical Free Church of America. The congregation serendipitously purchased the Augustana Lutheran Church building, allowing them to expand from the other church on the block, which they had owned since 2003. Now Augustana Lutheran Church is known as Hope Community Church East.
