= Downtown West, Minneapolis =

Coordinates: 44.9741°N 93.2732°W

Downtown West
- Neighborhood
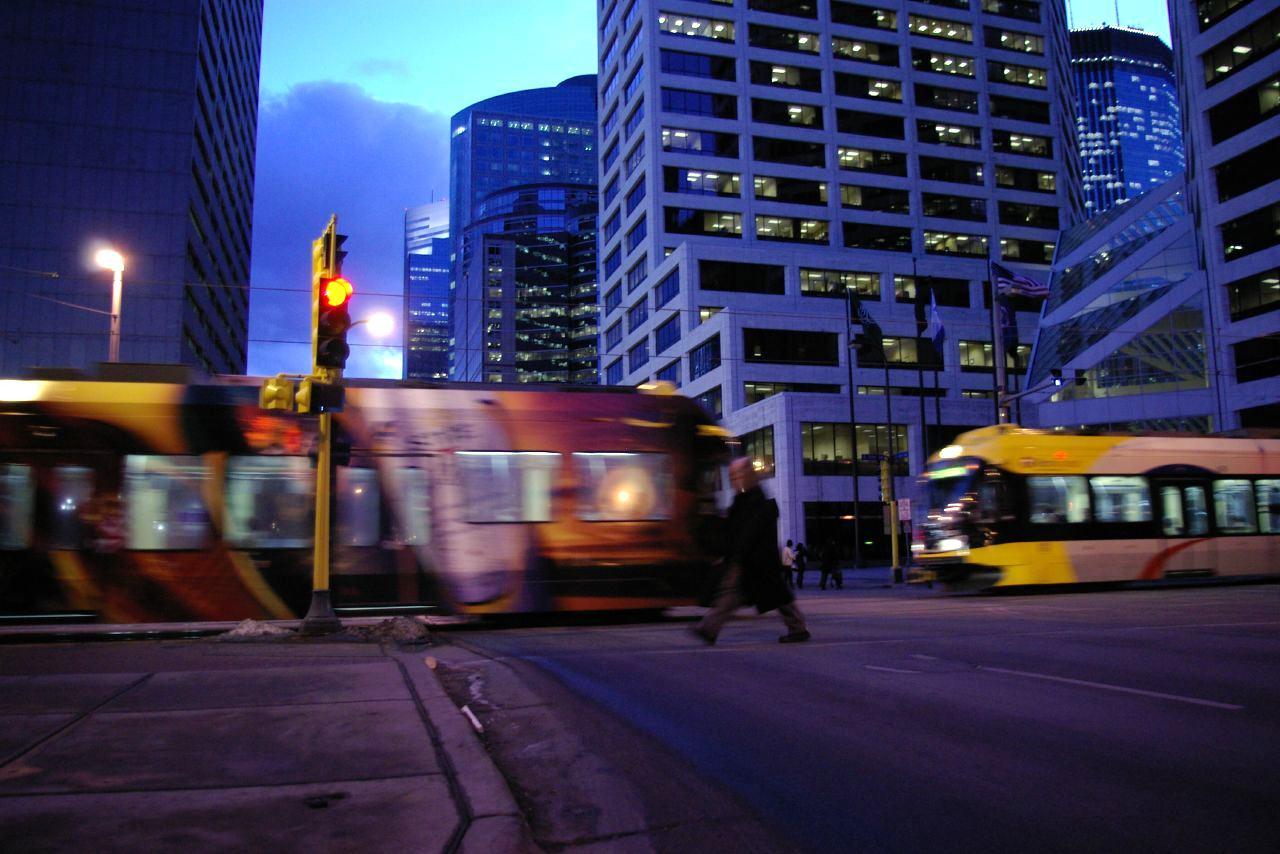
- Lightrail passes through the center of Downtown Minneapolis

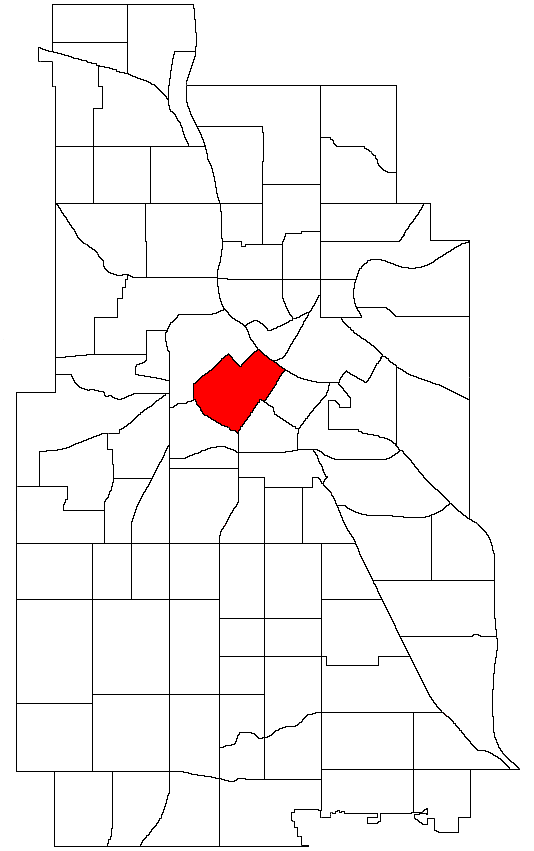
- Location of Downtown West within the U.S. city of Minneapolis
- Interactive map of Downtown West
- Country: United States
- State: Minnesota
- County: Hennepin
- City: Minneapolis
- Community: Central
- Founded: 1849
- City Council wards: 3, 7

Government
  - Council member: Michael Rainville
  - Council member: Elizabeth Shaffer

Area
  - Total: 0.759 sq mi (1.97 km^{2})

Population (2020)
  - Total: 8,958
  - Density: 11,800/sq mi (4,560/km^{2})
- Time zone: UTC-6 (CST)
  - Summer (DST): UTC-5 (CDT)
- ZIP code: 55401, 55402, 55403, 55404, 55415, 55487
- Area code: 612

Historical population
Census	Pop.	Note	%±
1980	3,522		—
1990	3,789		7.6%
2000	4,581		20.9%
2010	5,781		26.2%
2020	8,958		55.0%

Downtown West is an official neighborhood in Minneapolis, part of the larger Central community. It is the heart of downtown Minneapolis (and Minneapolis as a whole), containing the bulk of high-rise office buildings in the city, and is what comes to mind when most Minneapolitans think of "downtown". The neighborhood is split between the third and seventh wards of the Minneapolis City Council and between districts 61A and 59B in the Minnesota Legislature.

The boundaries are as follows (going in a clockwise direction): 12th Street to the southwest, 3rd Avenue North, Washington Avenue North, and Hennepin Avenue to the northwest, the Mississippi River to the northeast, and Portland Avenue, 5th Street South, and 5th Avenue South to the southeast. It is bordered by the North Loop, Nicollet Island/East Bank, Downtown East, Elliot Park, and Loring Park neighborhoods.

Downtown West is home to most of Minneapolis's most notable buildings like the Foshay Tower and IDS Center.

== Demographics ==
Race/ethnicity
Race/ethnicity	2000		2010		2020	
Race/ethnicity	Number	%	Number	%	Number	%
White alone	2,996	65.40	3,473	60.08	5,201	58.28
Black alone	1,034	22.57	1,162	20.10	1,477	16.55
Hispanic or Latino (any race)	139	3.03	225	3.89	467	5.23
Native American alone	76	1.66	81	1.40	133	1.49
Asian alone	217	4.74	693	11.99	1,266	14.19
Other race alone	6	0.13	9	0.16	33	0.37
Pacific Islander alone	2	0.04	6	0.10	6	0.07
Two or more races	111	2.42	132	2.28	341	3.82
Total	4,581	100.0	5,781	100.0	8,924	100.0
