= Downtown Minneapolis =

Coordinates: 44.9763°N 93.2739°W

- Community
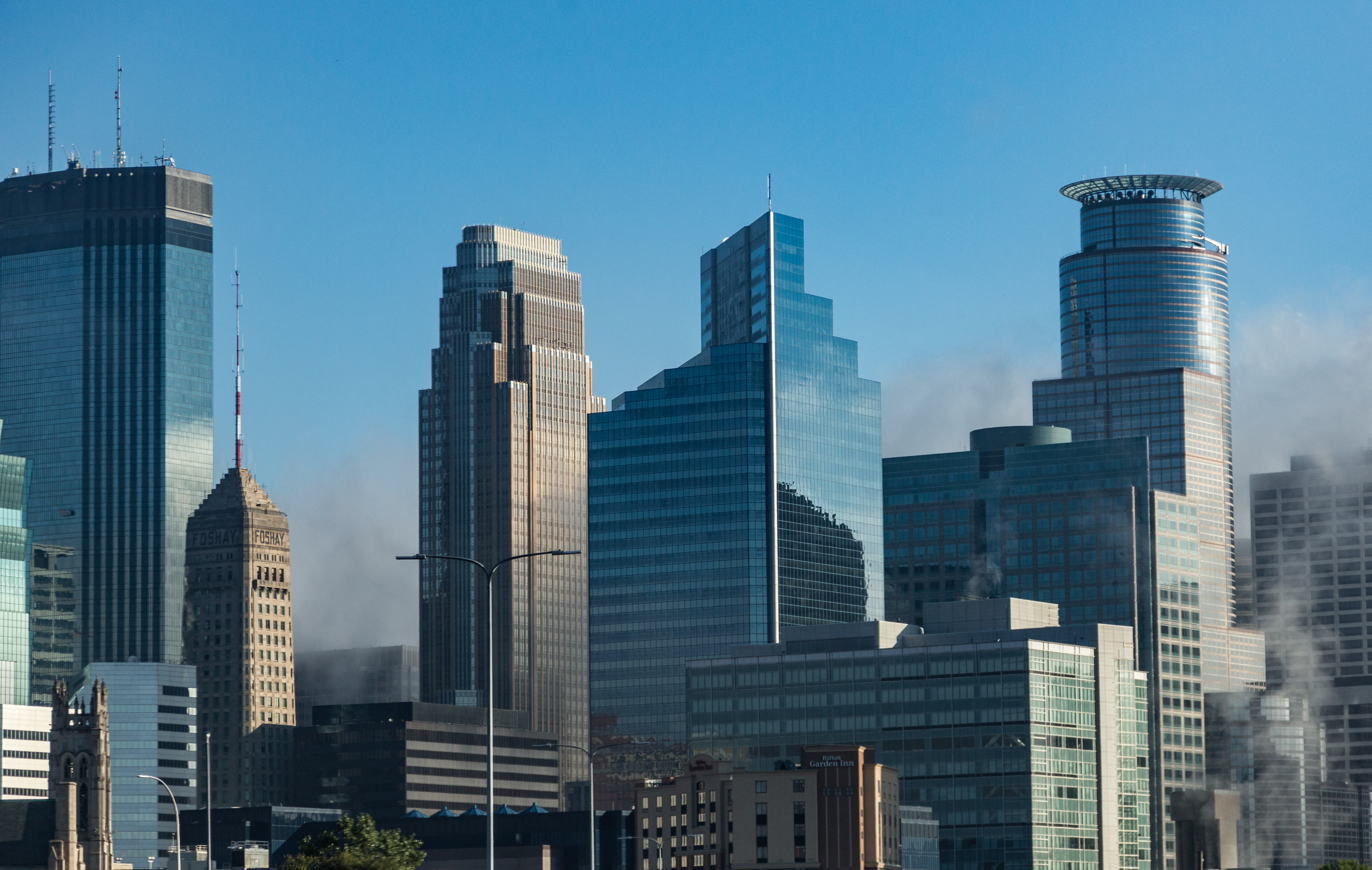
- Downtown Minneapolis in 2017

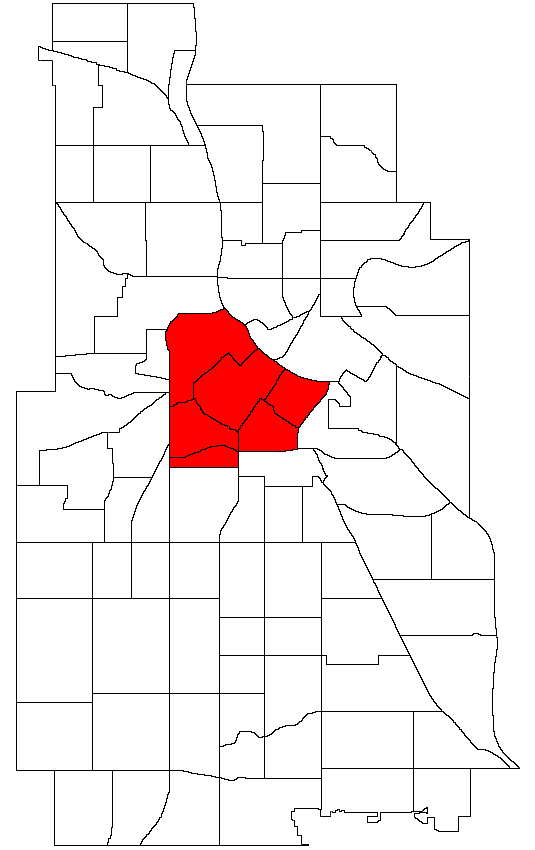
- Location of the Central Minneapolis community in Minneapolis
- Interactive map of Downtown Minneapolis
- Country: United States
- State: Minnesota
- County: Hennepin
- City: Minneapolis
- Founded: 1849
- City Council Wards: 3, 5, 6, 7
- Neighborhoods: List: Downtown East; Downtown West; Elliot Park; Loring Park; North Loop; Stevens Square-Loring Heights

Government
  - Council Member: Michael Rainville
  - Council Member: Pearll Warren
  - Council Member: Jamal Osman
  - Council Member: Elizabeth Shaffer

Area
  - Total: 3.024 sq mi (7.83 km^{2})

Population (2023)
  - Total: 60,549
  - Density: 19,315/sq mi (7,458/km^{2})
- Time zone: UTC-6 (CST)
  - Summer (DST): UTC-5 (CDT)
- ZIP Code: 55401, 55402, 55403, 55404, 55405, 55411, 55415, 55454, 55487
- Area code: 612

Historical population
Census	Pop.	Note	%±
1980	18,952		—
1990	21,158		11.6%
2000	24,149		14.1%
2010	29,725		23.1%
2020	53,093		78.6%
2024 (est.)	60,549		14.0%

Downtown Minneapolis, officially designated as the Central community, is an area at the center of Minneapolis along the southwest banks of the Mississippi River, containing the city's central business district and entertainment core. Exact definitions vary, but the official community contains six smaller official neighborhoods.

== Neighborhoods and definition ==
Definitions of downtown Minneapolis are variable. The official Central community, contains six neighborhoods, mostly concurrent with definitions of downtown:

- Downtown East
- Downtown West
- Elliot Park
- Loring Park
- North Loop, commonly referred to as the Warehouse District
- Stevens Square/Loring Heights

The visitor organization Meet Minneapolis defines downtown as approximately the same area, but excludes Stevens Square and including the Walker Art Center. The Downtown Improvement District, a business-led nonprofit funded by city ordinance, defines it as a smaller region centered on Nicollet Mall and 5th Street, excluding Stevens Square, much of the North Loop, and Elliot Park.

== Government ==
Downtown Minneapolis is home to several local government buildings, such as the Hennepin County Government Center, Minneapolis Central Library, and Minneapolis City Hall. Federal government buildings include the Federal Reserve Bank of Minneapolis, which covers the 9th district, the Diana E. Murphy U.S. Courthouse, and the Martin Olav Sabo Post Office.

There is no city council ward representing the majority of downtown Minneapolis. It is split between Wards 3, 5, 6, and 7. It is also split between state legislative districts 59B, 61A, and 62A.

== Sites of interest ==
The city's downtown includes many old flour mills, the Mill District, and other historical and industrial areas alongside some high-density residential areas surrounding the business core, excluding areas east of the Mississippi River.

Downtown Minneapolis features pedestrian-friendly infrastructure, including the Minneapolis Skyway System, which connects buildings over 80 blocks of downtown through 9.5 miles of enclosed elevated walkways and Nicollet Mall, a pedestrian mall through the downtown core.

=== Entertainment ===
Multiple major professional sports teams play in Downtown Minneapolis, including the Minnesota Lynx and Minnesota Timberwolves (at Target Center); the Minnesota Twins (at Target Field); and the Minnesota Vikings (at U.S. Bank Stadium). The Guthrie Theater complex is on the river downtown, after moving from Loring Park.

=== Infrastructure ===
Businesses based in the downtown area include the corporate headquarters of the Star Tribune, Target, US Bancorp, and the broadcast facilities of the Minnesota CBS affiliate WCCO-TV. Other significant buildings include the Foshay Tower, built in 1929, one of the tallest buildings in the Midwest for decades; the IDS Tower, the tallest building in Minnesota.

Being seated on the Mississippi River, downtown Minneapolis contains the west ends of the Hennepin Avenue Bridge, the Third Avenue Bridge, the I-35W Saint Anthony Falls Bridge (which replaced the I-35W Mississippi River bridge), and the Stone Arch Bridge. Downtown Minneapolis is a transit hub, with stops for several BRT routes and four light rail stops served by Metro Transit.

In the early days of Minneapolis, its downtown was home to several flour mills, including the Washburn A-Mill, which was destroyed in the Great Mill Disaster in 1878. The Mill City Museum is located on the site of the former Washburn A-Mill. Mill Ruins Park between the mill and the river features several sites of interest uncovered by an archaeological study.

== Gallery ==
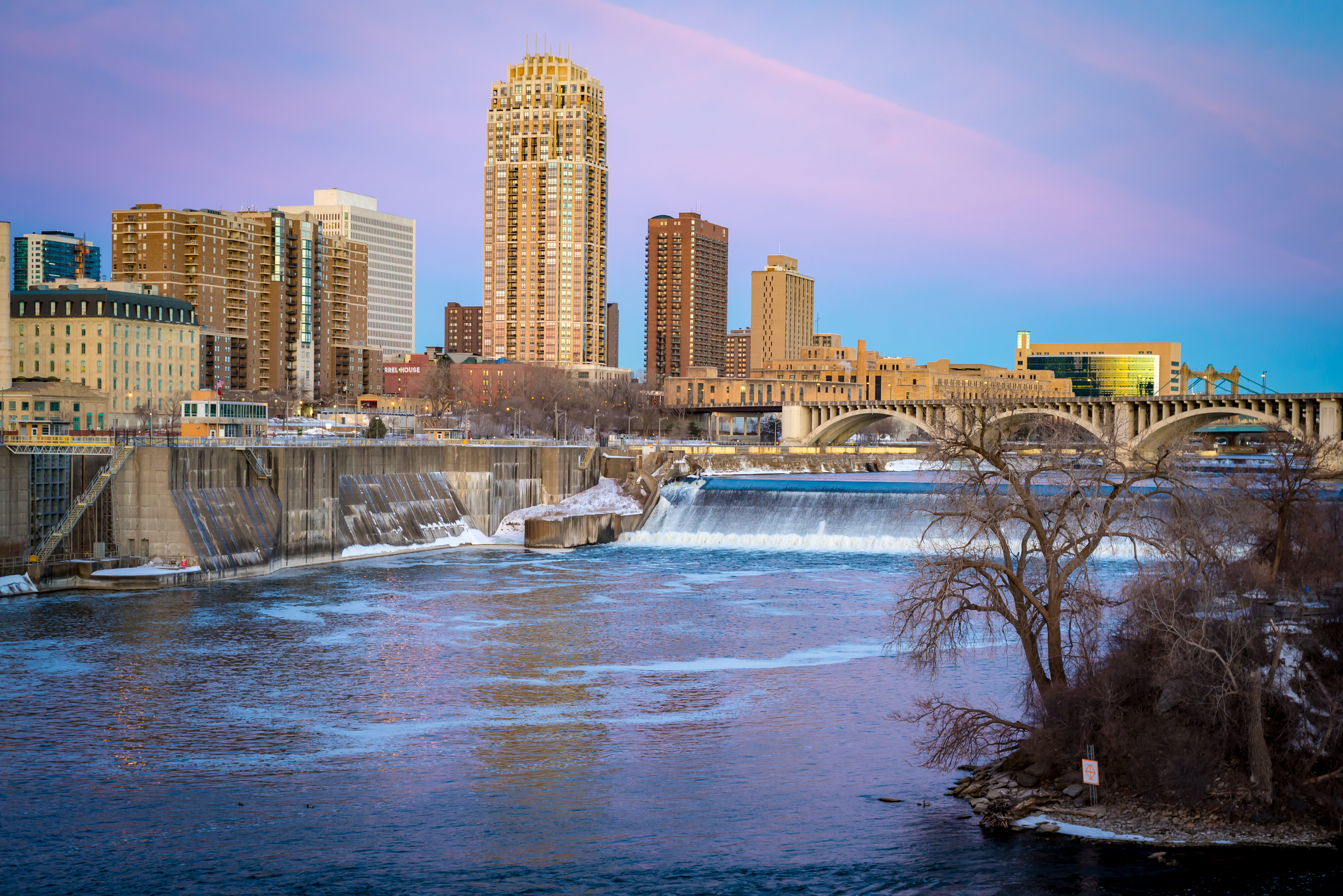
View of downtown Minneapolis from the Stone Arch Bridge.

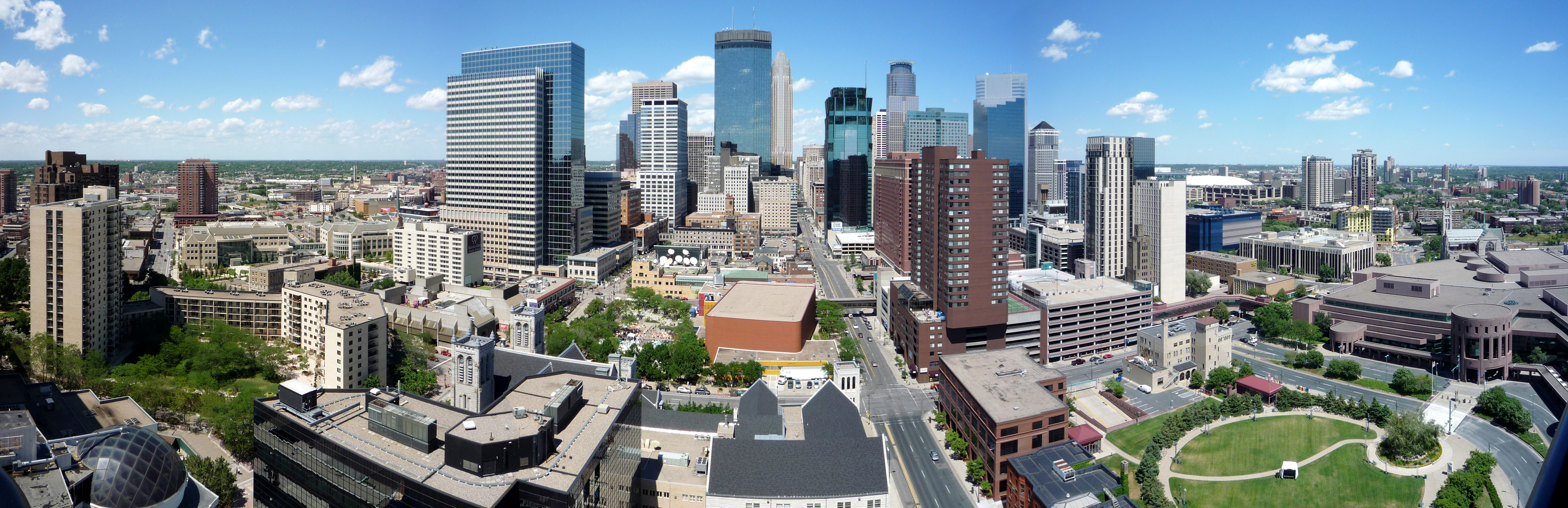
The skyline of Minneapolis in July 2008

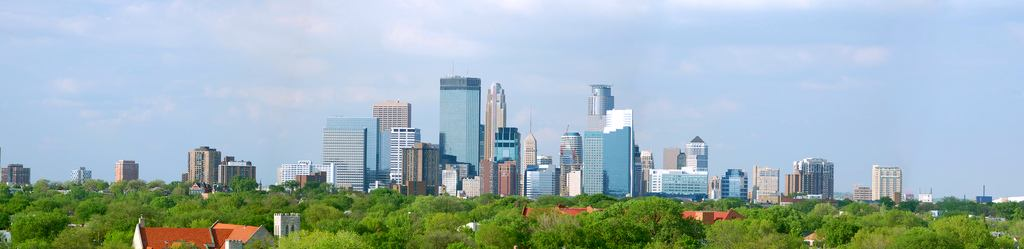
Downtown Minneapolis panorama

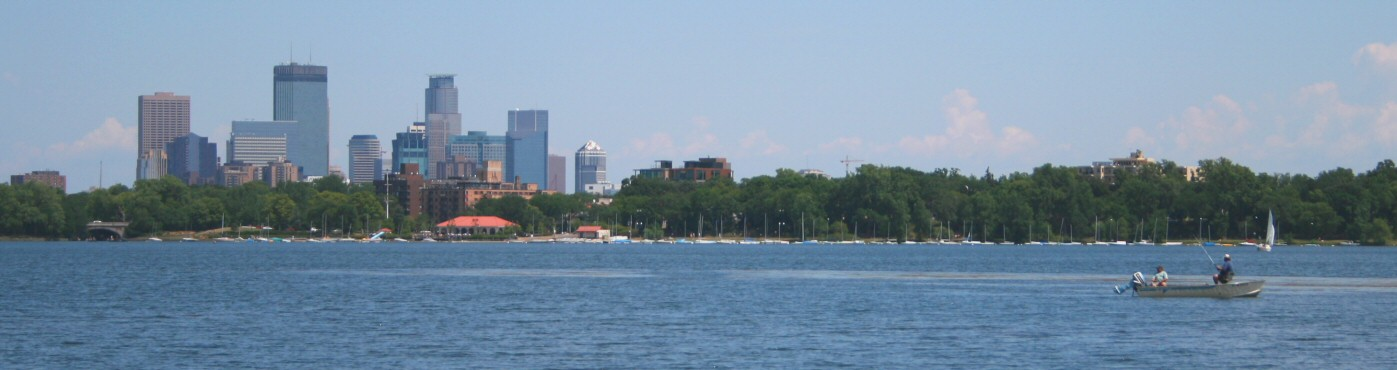
Downtown Minneapolis from Bde Maka Ska.

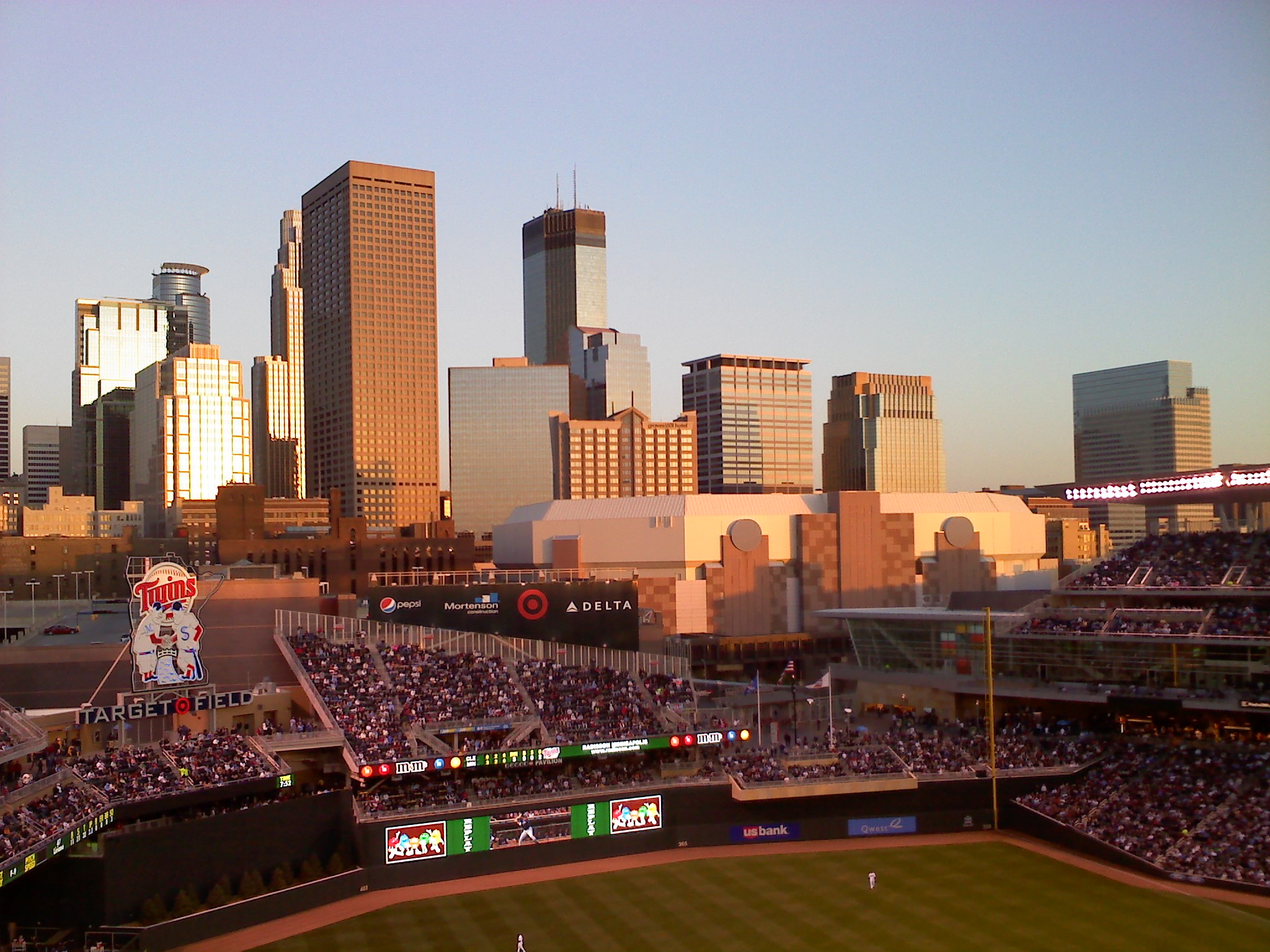
Minneapolis skyline from Target Field.
Notable buildings
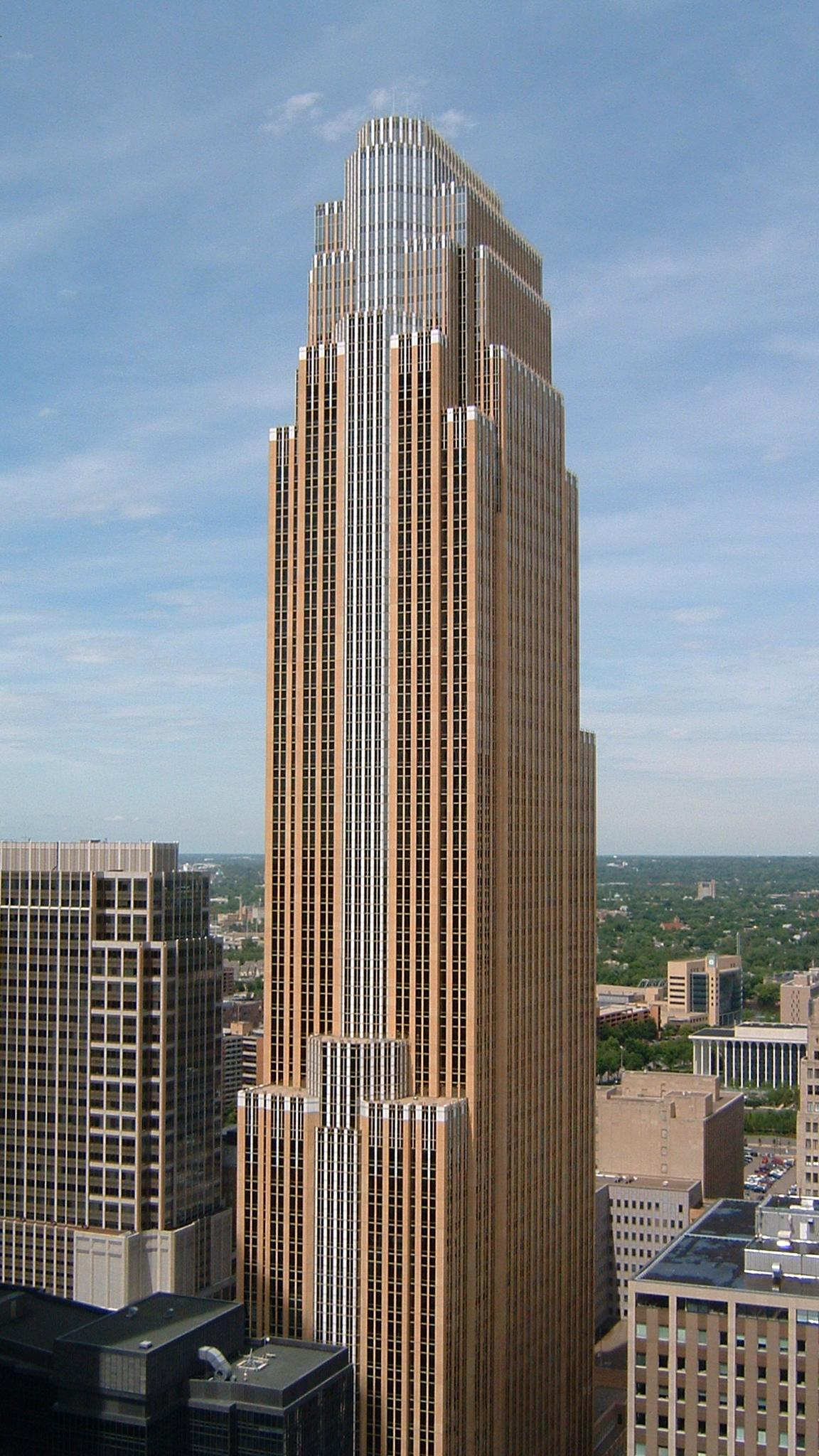
Wells Fargo Center from the Foshay Tower

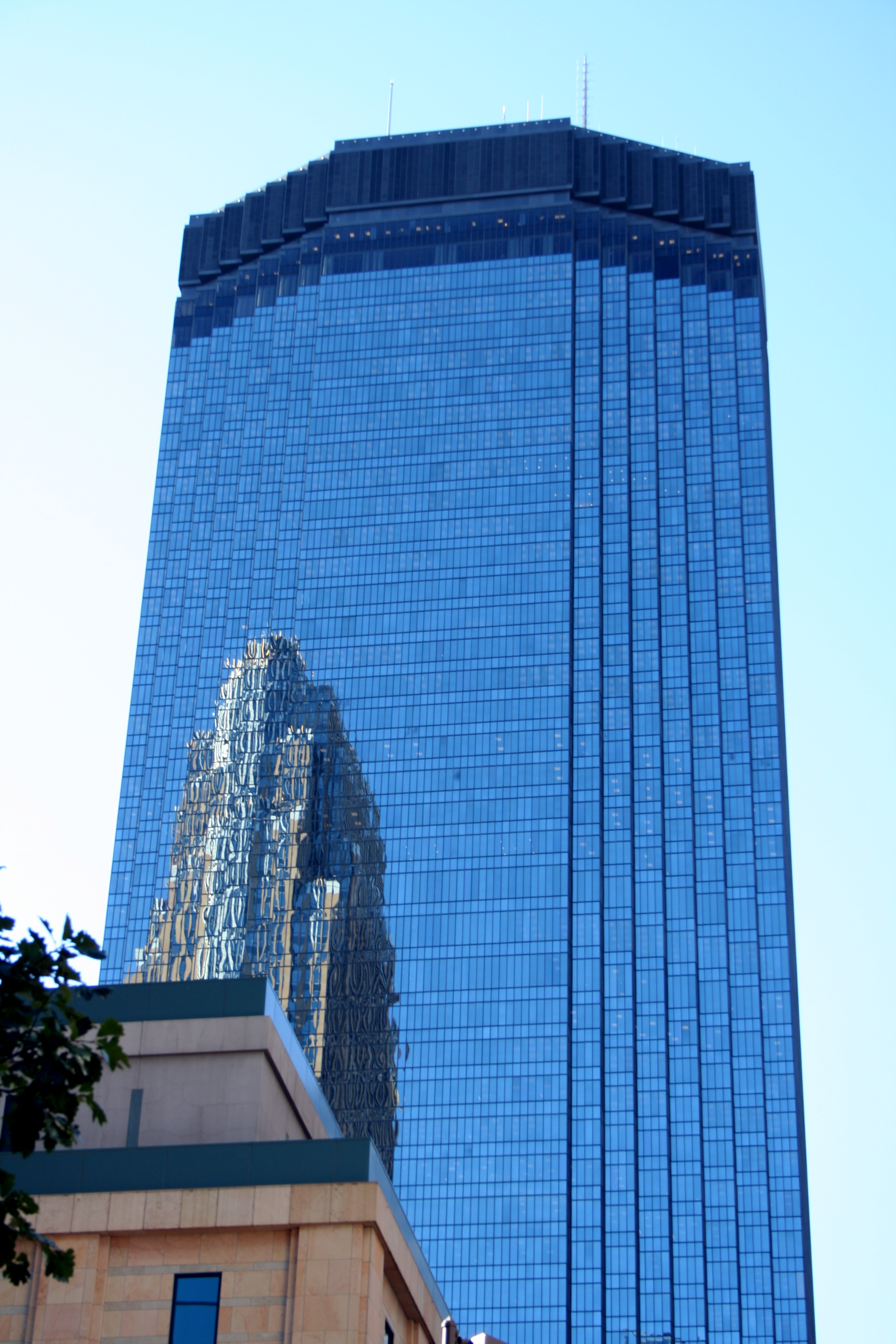
IDS Center, the tallest building in Minneapolis and Minnesota

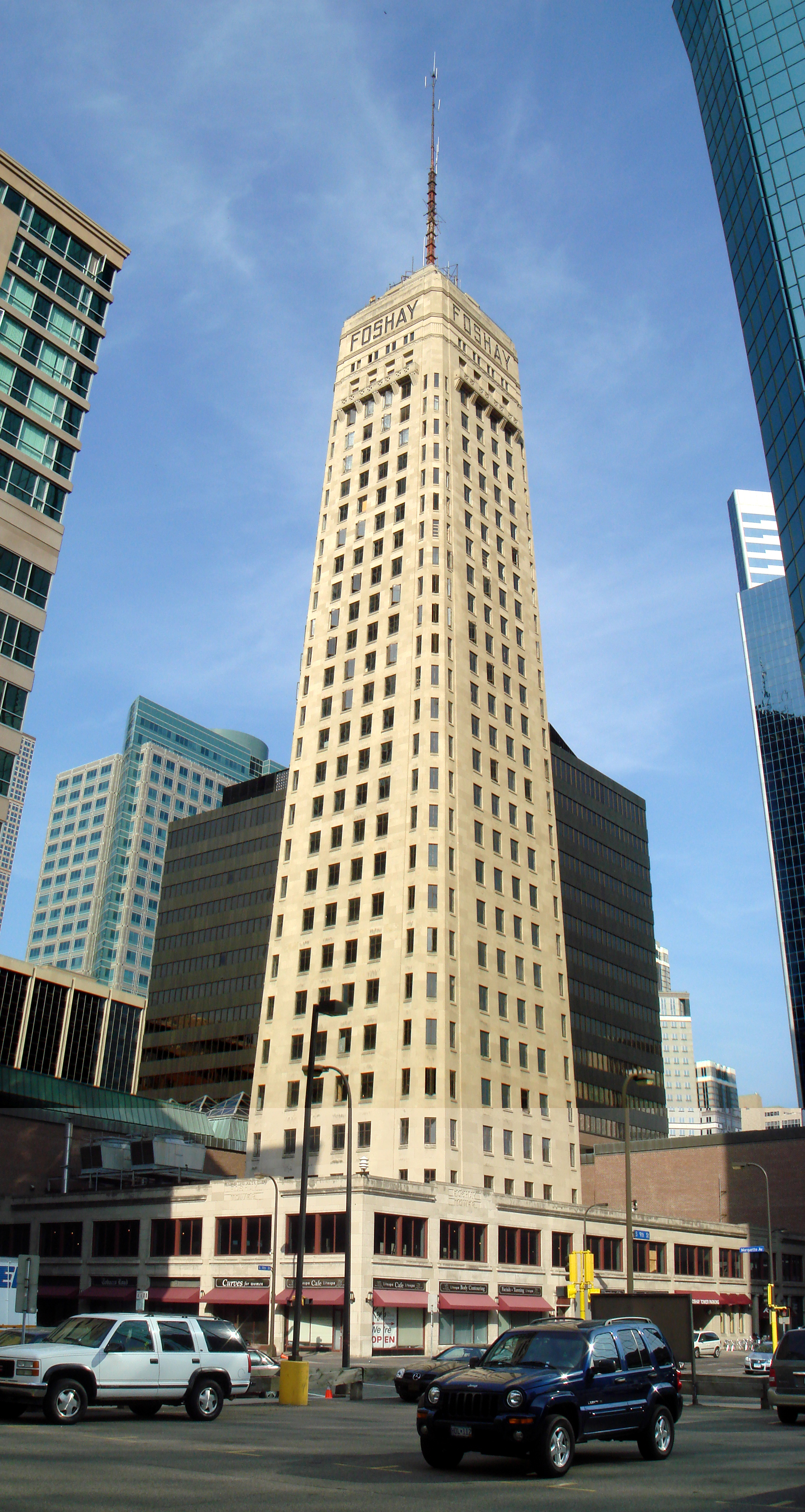
The Foshay Tower

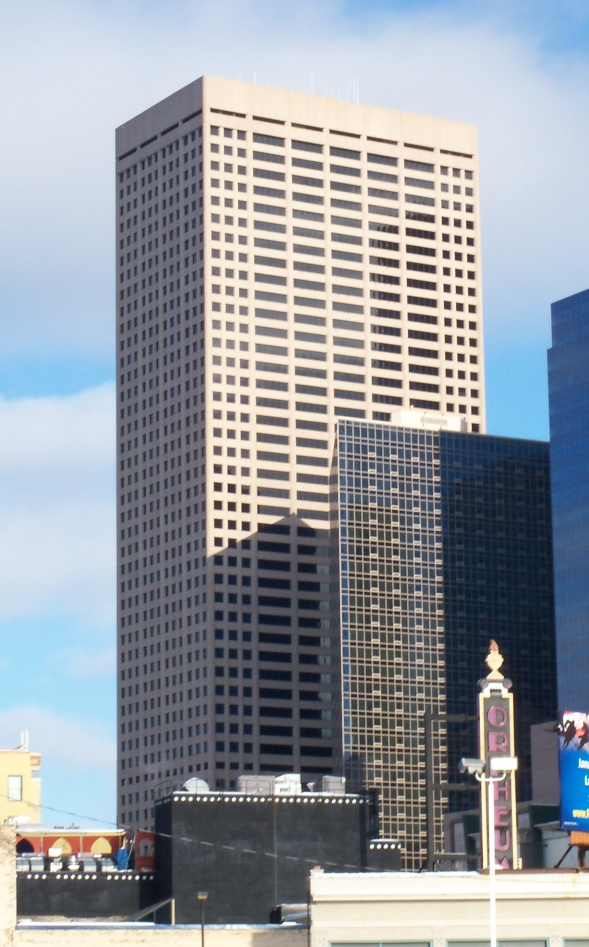
33 South Sixth, also known as the City Center

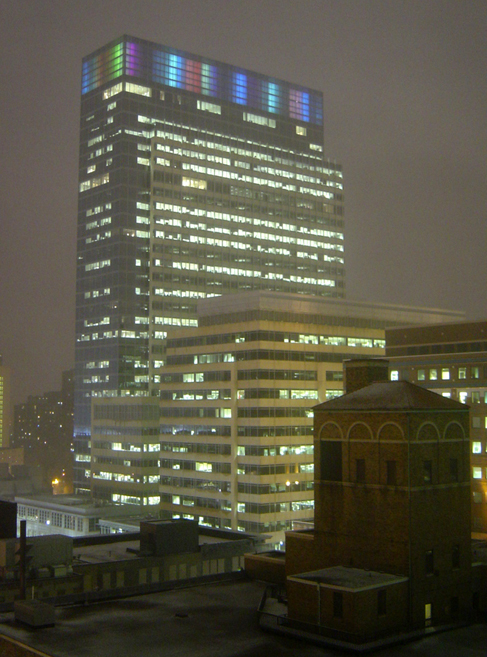
Target Plaza South, the headquarters of Target Corporation, lit up multicolored during the winter.

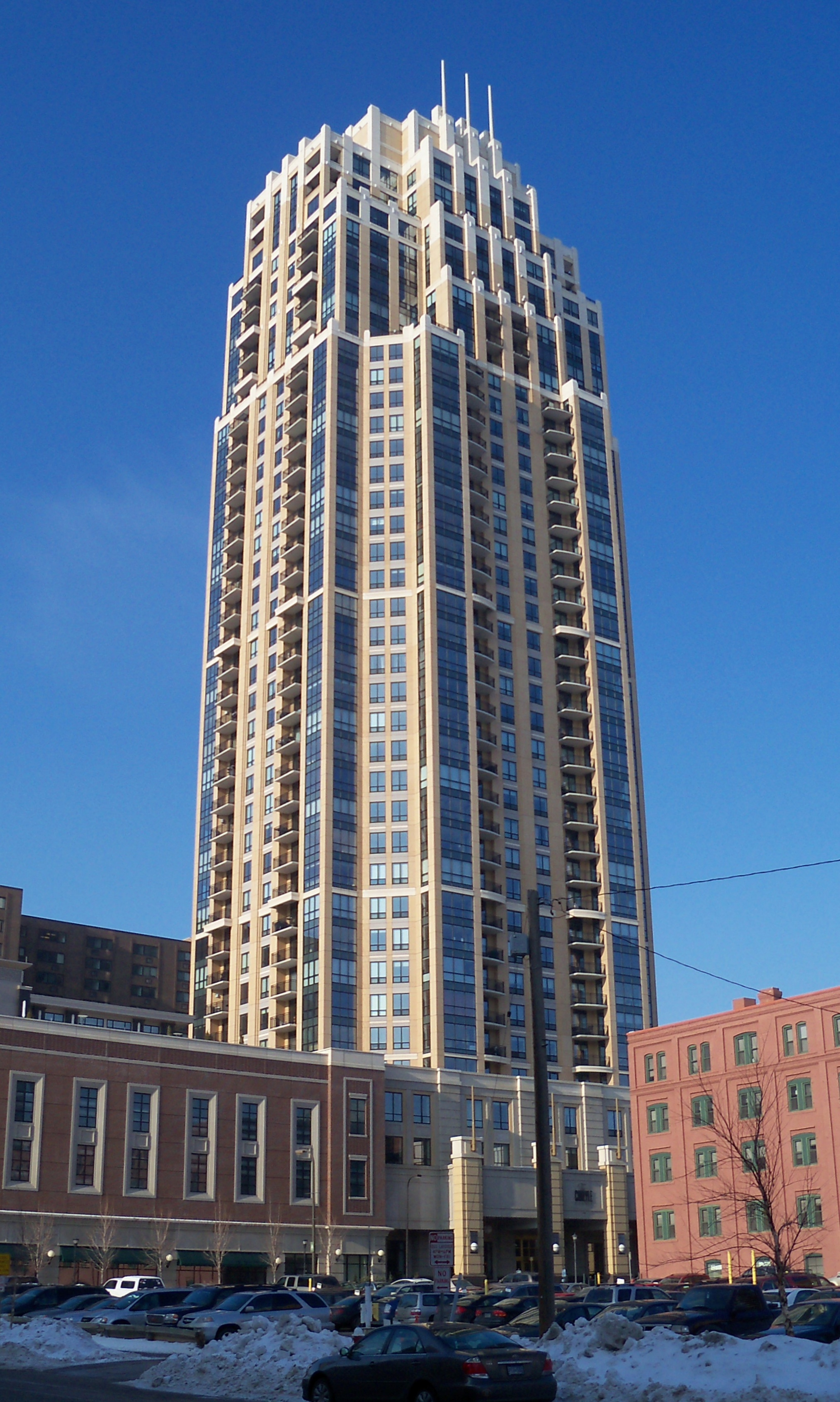
The Carlyle

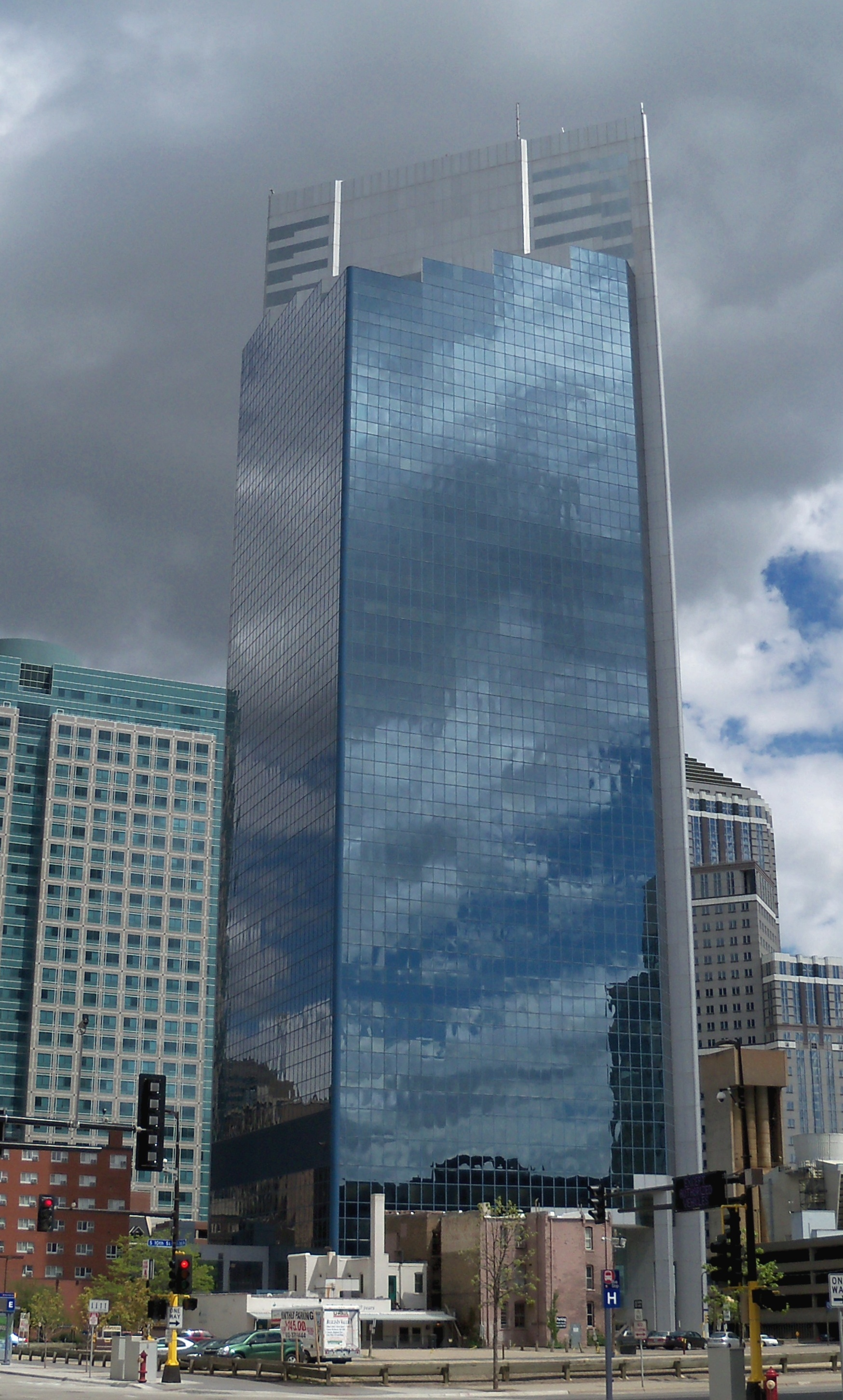
Campbell Mithun Tower

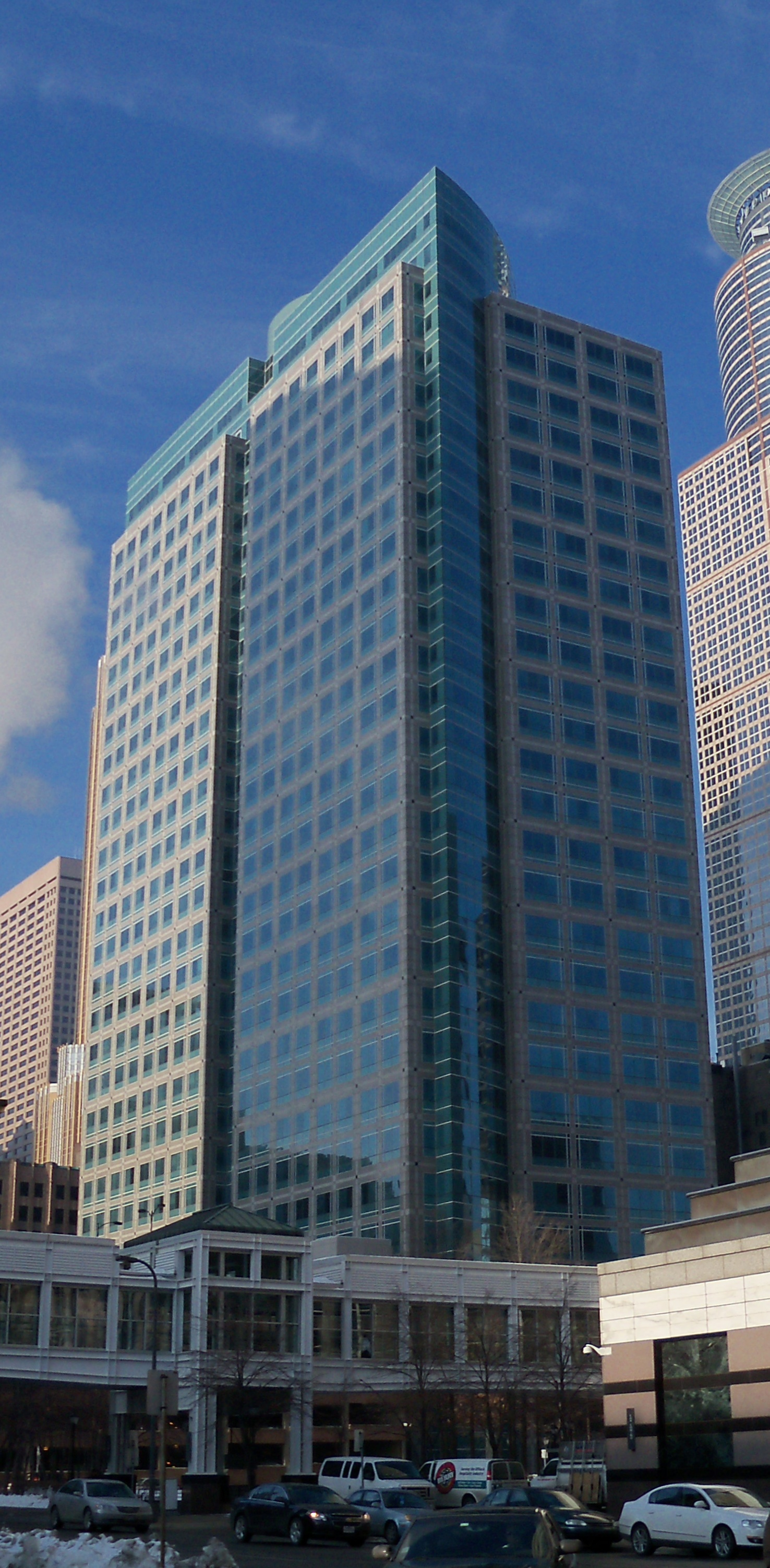
The Ameriprise Financial Center.

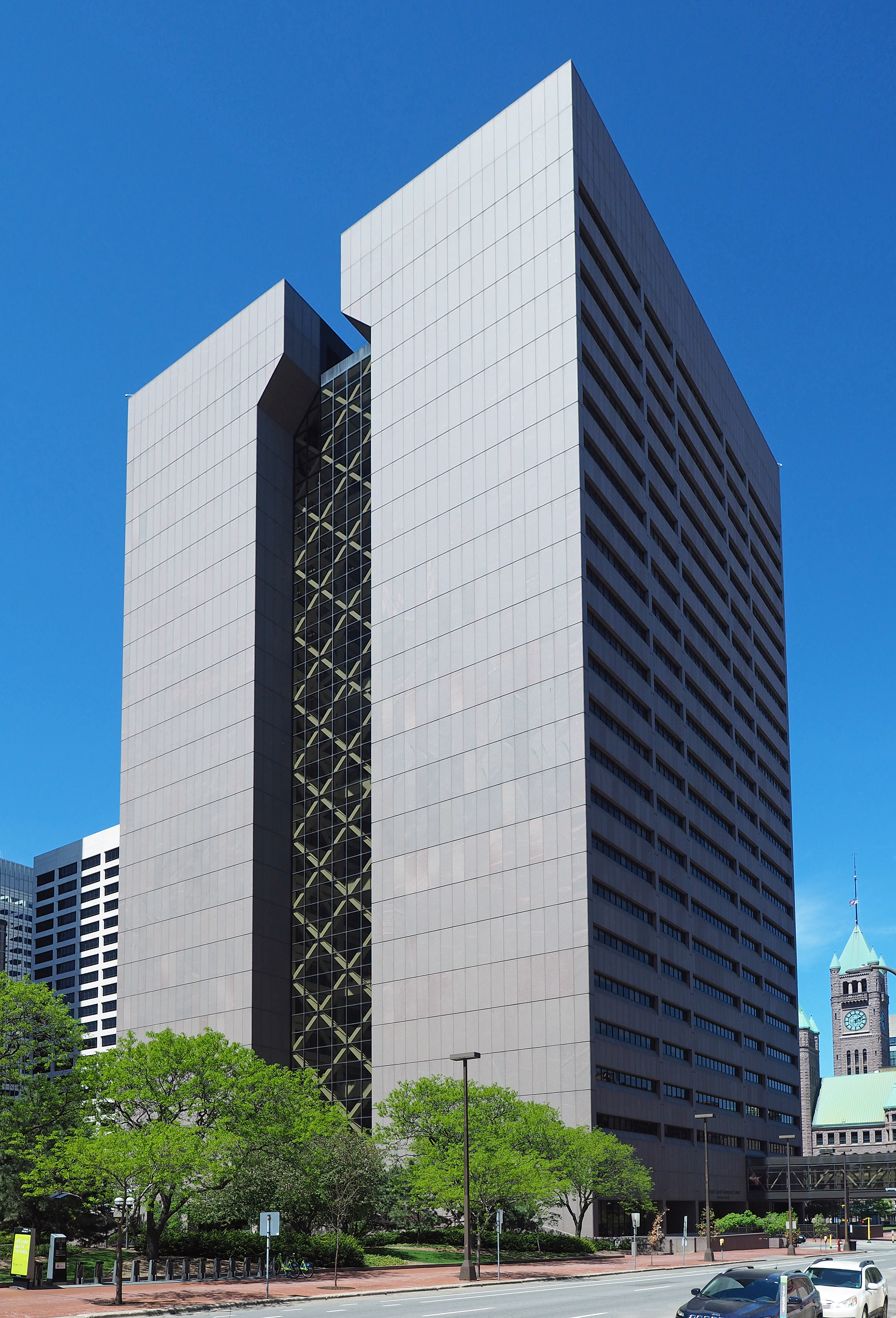
The Hennepin County Government Center, often the site of protests.

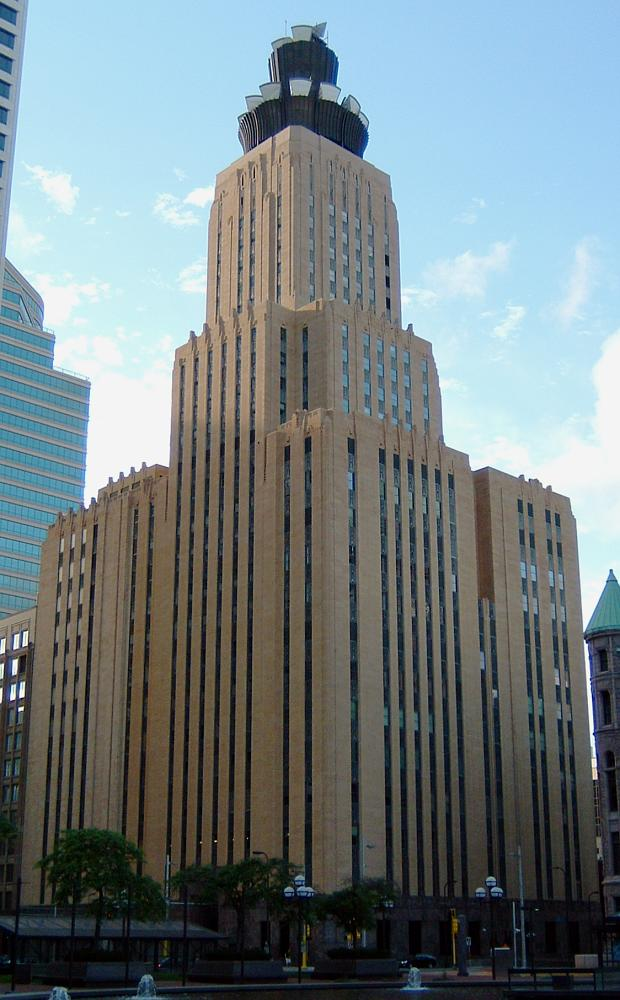
The CenturyLink Building, the 17th tallest building in Minneapolis.

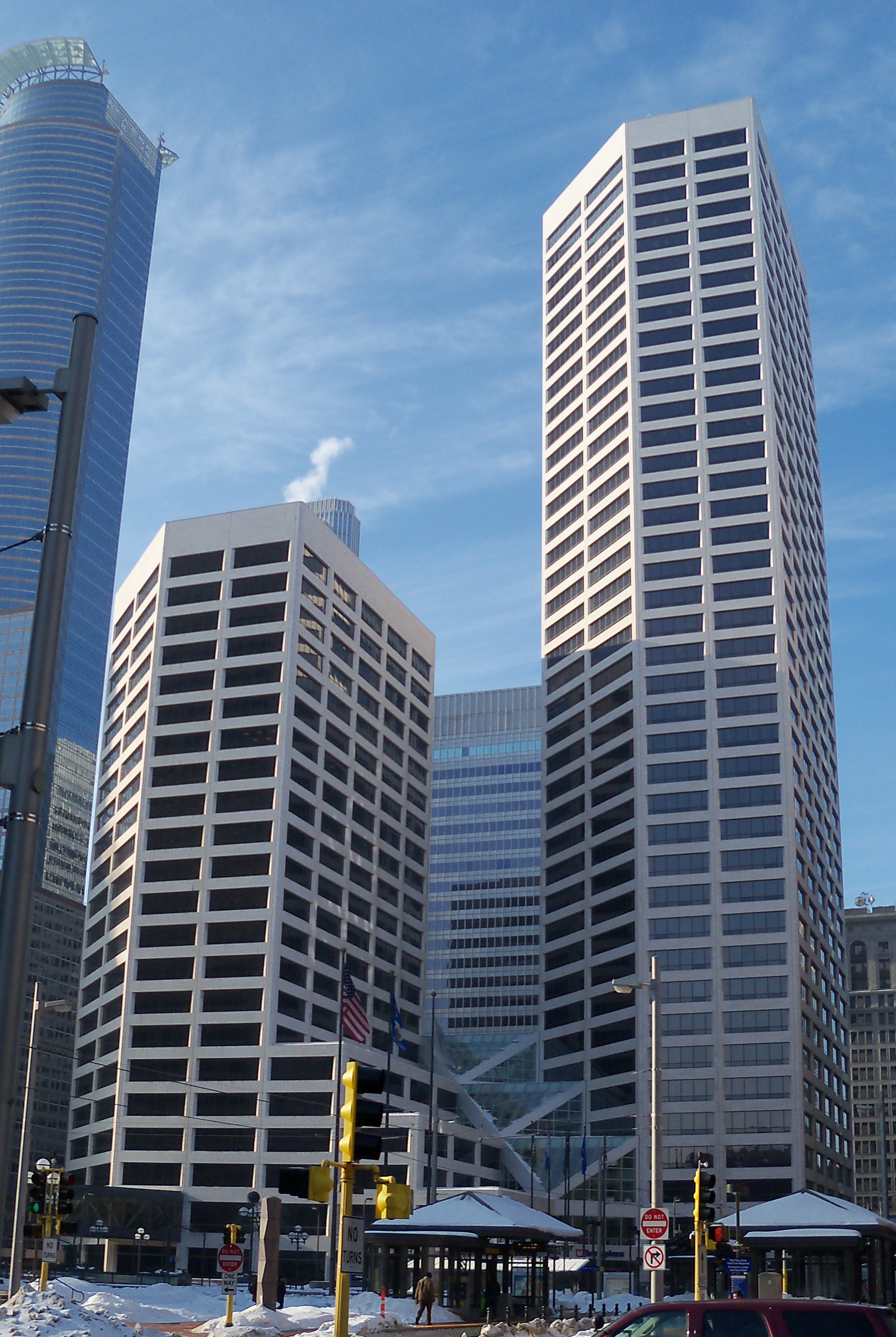
US Bank Plaza, the 6th tallest building in Minneapolis.

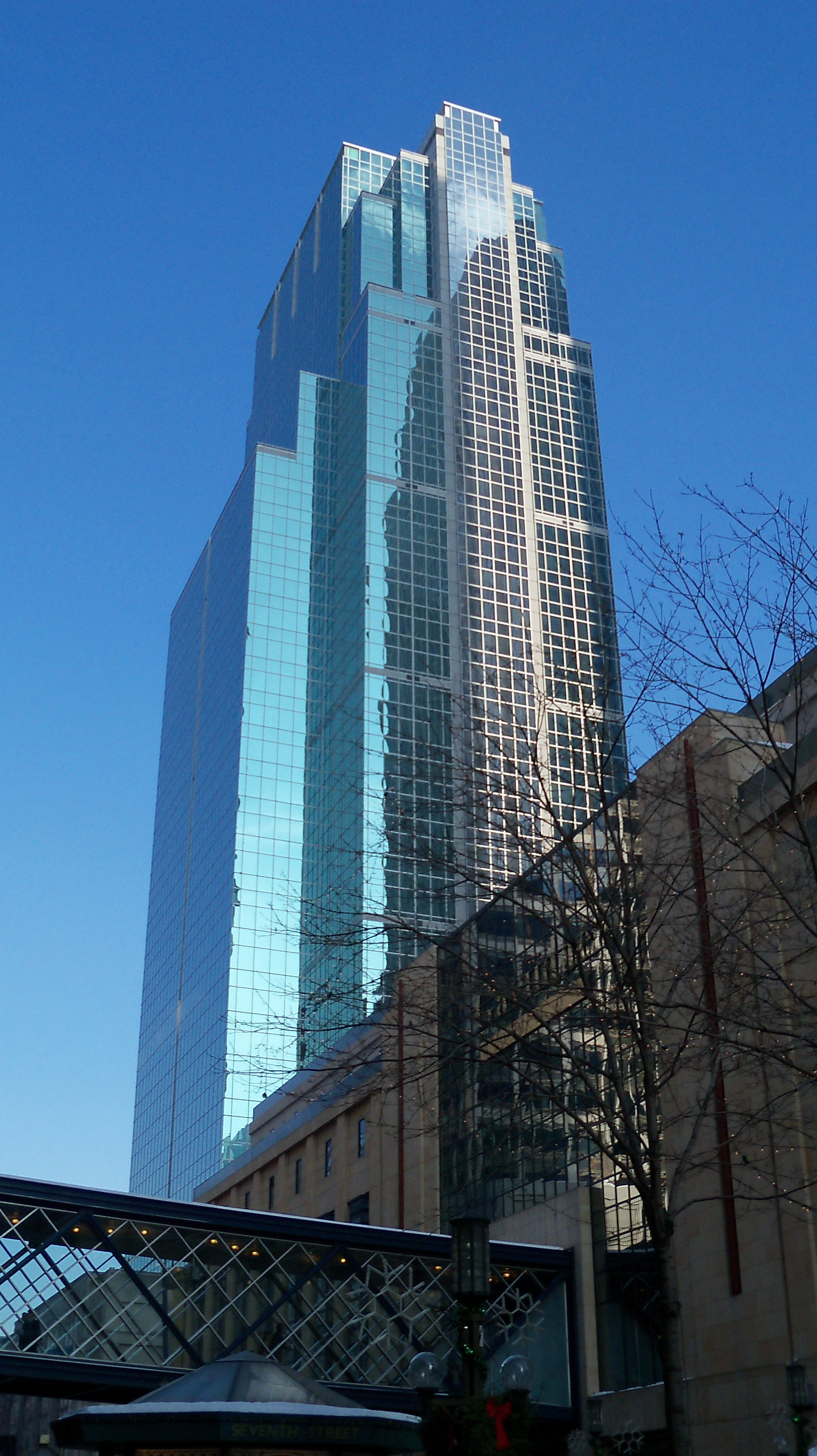
RBC Plaza

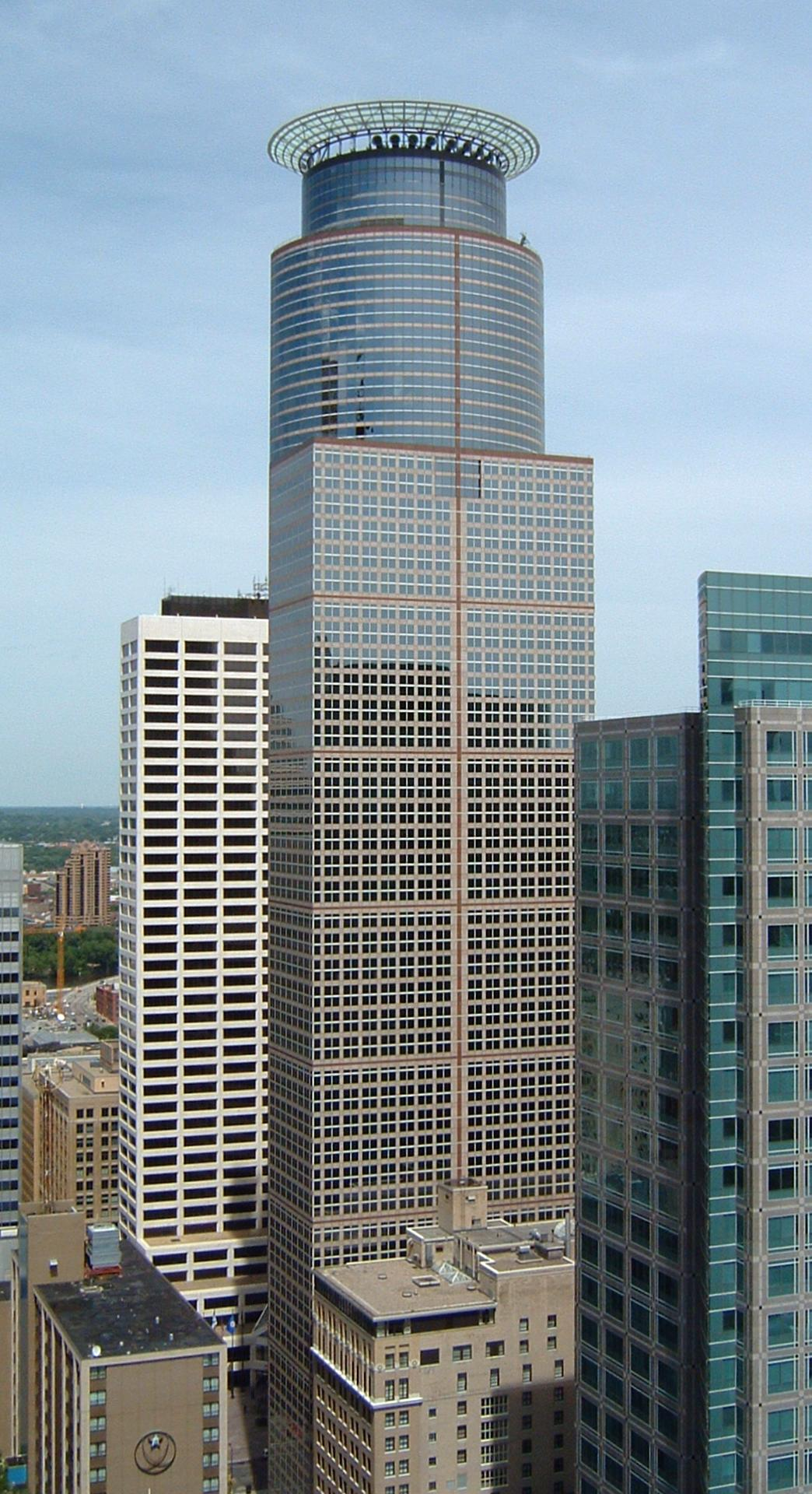
Capella Tower

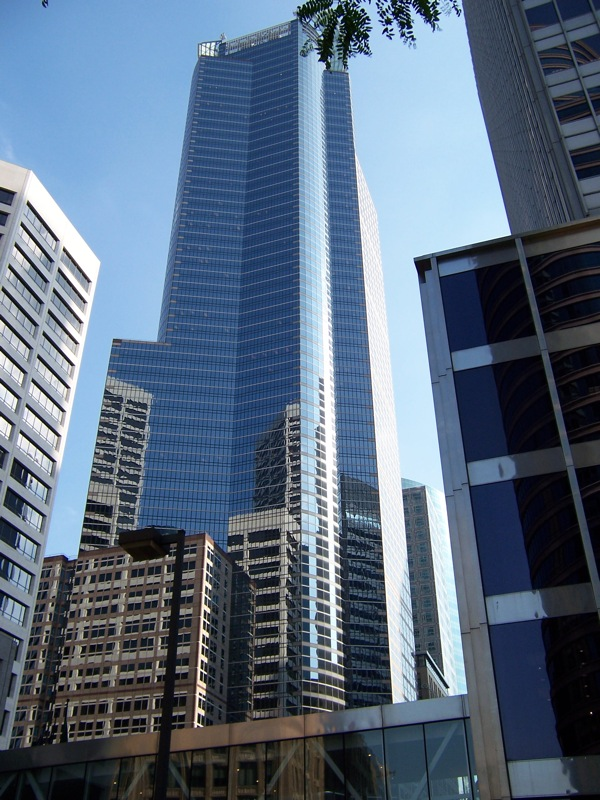
White U.S. Bancorp towers reflected in the Capella Tower.

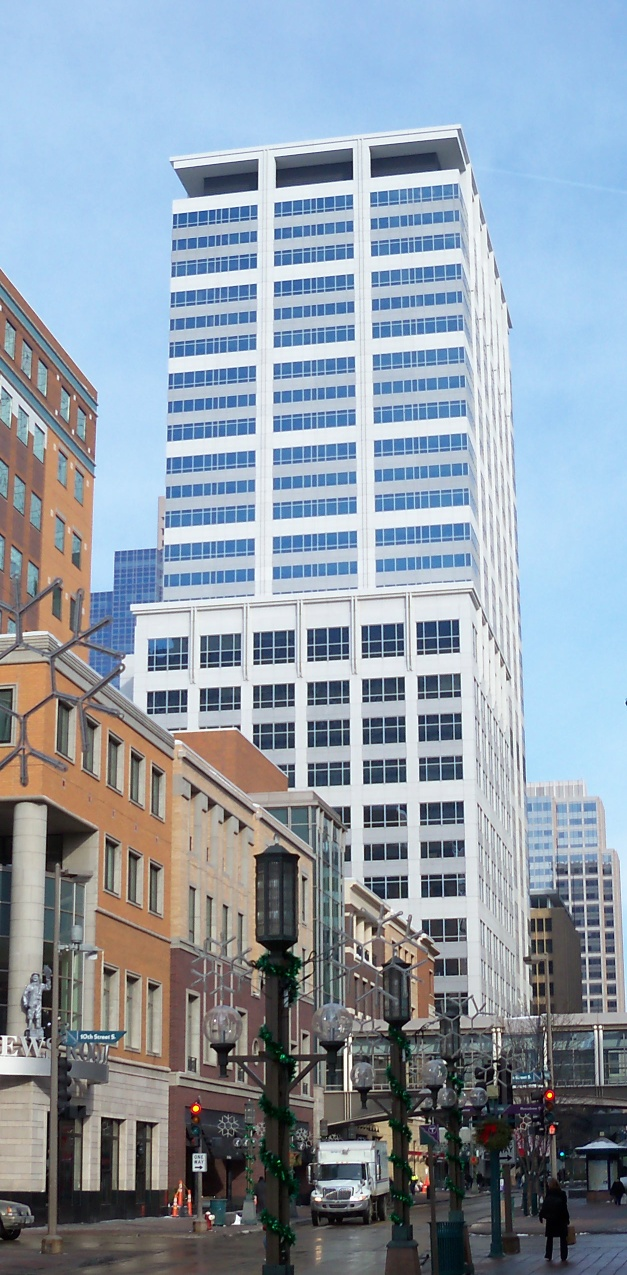
US Bancorp Center

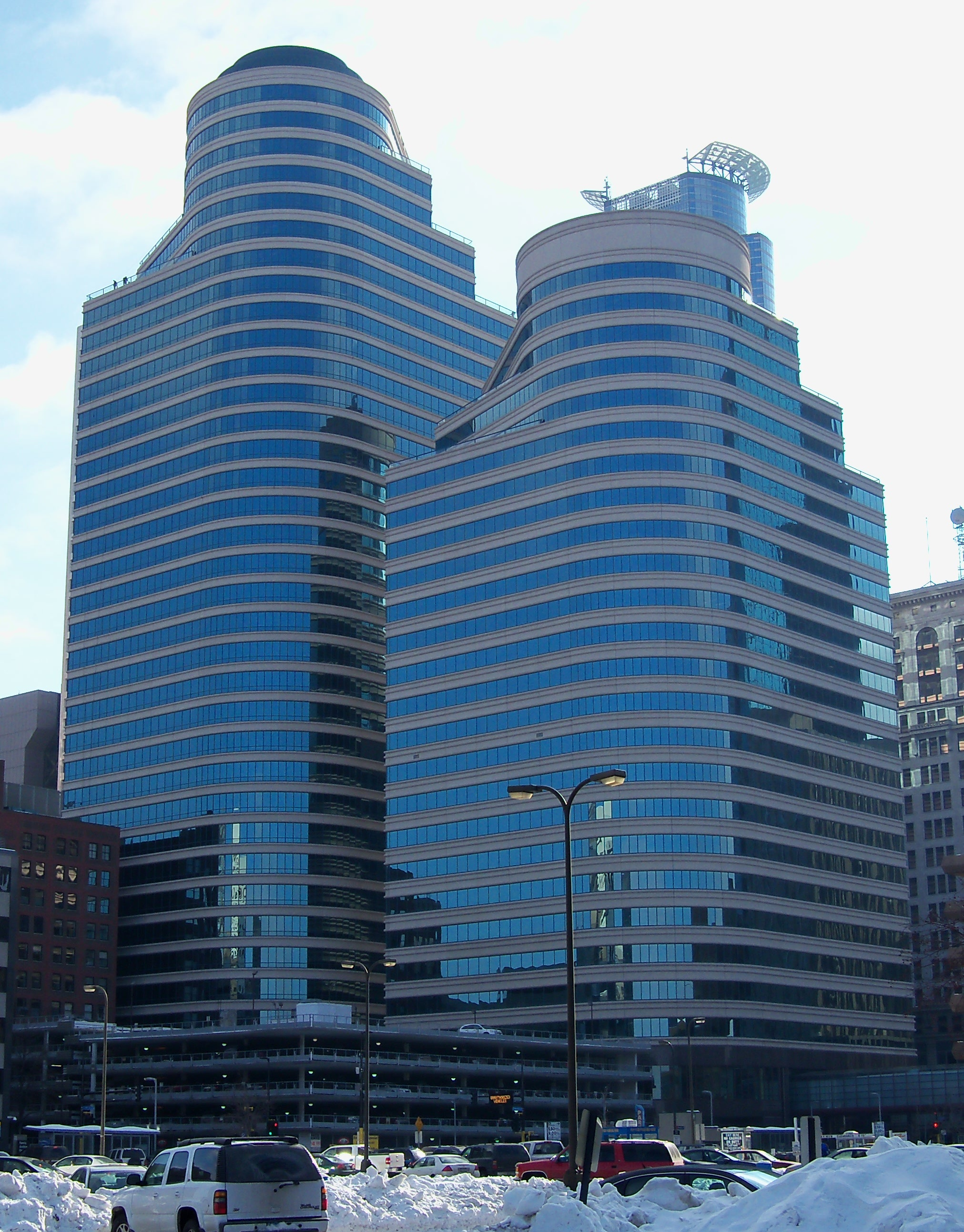
Fifth Street Towers

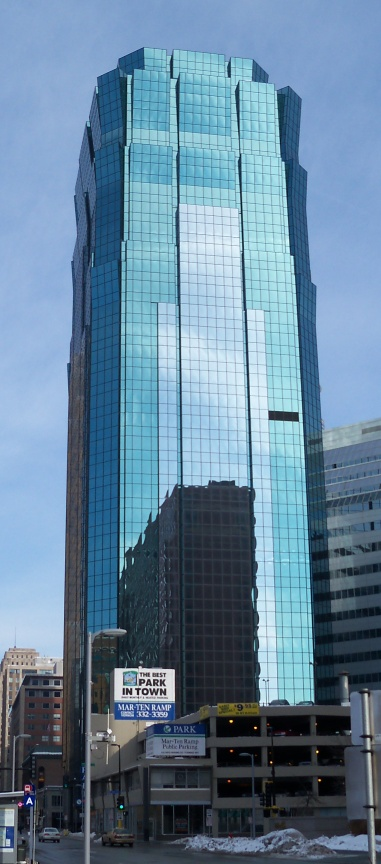
AT&T Tower

== See also ==
- Neighborhoods of Minneapolis
