= First Church of Christ, Scientist (Minneapolis) =

Historic church in Minnesota, United States

- U.S. National Register of Historic Places
- Minneapolis Landmark
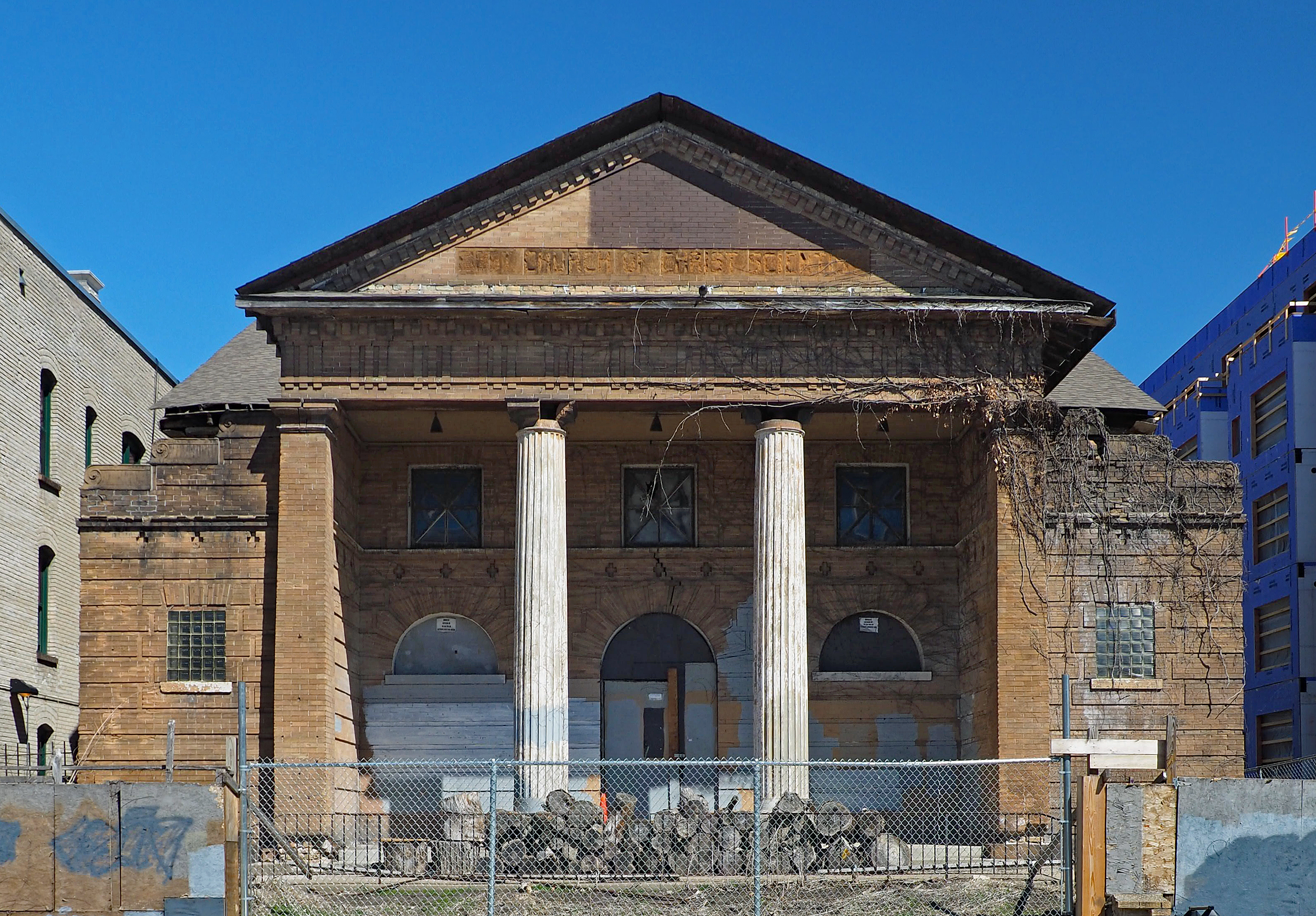
- The First Church of Christ, Scientist from the south

- Location within Minnesota Location within the United States
- Location: 614-620 15th Street East, Minneapolis, Minnesota
- Coordinates: 44°58′6″N 93°16′0″W
- Built: 1897
- Architect: Septimus J. Bowler
- Architectural style: Beaux Arts, Renaissance, Classical Revival
- NRHP reference No.: 86001340

Significant dates
- Added to NRHP: June 20, 1986
- Designated MPLSL: 1986

The First Church of Christ, Scientist building in Minneapolis, Minnesota, was the first of its kind in the state.

Located at 614-620 15th Street East, in the residential neighborhood of Elliott Park, the church was once surrounded by Victorian homes. Minneapolis architect S. J. Bowler designed the building in the Doric order. The facade of the building featured a deep portico with two fluted columns holding up a pedimented gable.

== National Register listing ==
- First Church of Christ Scientist (added 1986 - Building - #86001340)
- 614–620 E. Fifteenth St., Minneapolis
- Historic Significance: Event, Architecture/Engineering
- Architect, builder, or engineer: Bowler, S.J.
- Architectural Style: Beaux Arts, Renaissance
- Area of Significance: Architecture, Religion
- Period of Significance: 1875-1899
- Owner: None
- Historic Function: Religion
- Historic Sub-function: Religious Structure
- Current Function: Demolished to make way for apartments

== Recent history ==
The building was used for several years as a laboratory performance space by the Margolis Brown Adaptors Company under the name 'Physical Theatre Lab'. It had been empty since 2001, and began taking serious damage in the roof and on the brick exterior. The building racked up safety violations and in 2007 a local real estate broker attempted to sell the church to an owner who would fix it up.

On January 28, 2012, the church was occupied temporarily by a group calling itself 'Minneapolis Space Liberation', as part of the larger Occupy movement. Approximately 50 people held the church for 45 minutes, during which time they had a dance party and food share. The action was conceived in solidarity with a building occupation in Oakland the same day, and to bring public attention to the many abandoned and neglected properties in the city.

The neighborhood came to know the building as both a nuisance, attracting vagrants and those looking to up their tagging game. But it was also championed as a potential restoration jewel in a city known to have torn down most of its historic buildings in the 1960s downtown rebuild.

== Demolition ==
Eventually, Weidner Apartment Homes bought property that included the site. They argued that the building was beyond renovation and would harm the apartments on either side of it. They lobbied to demolish the site. The city rejected their proposal.

The conflict went to the Minnesota Court of Appeals, who ruled that the city was wrong to deny the demolition. The building was razed in 2022.

== History of congregation ==
In 1914 First Church of Christ, Scientist, built its second edifice at 24th and Nicollet. Designed by noted Minneapolis architect Harry Wild Jones, this building is now the Minneapolis First Seventh-day Adventist Church.

== See also ==
- List of former Christian Science churches, societies and buildings
- National Register of Historic Places listings in Hennepin County, Minnesota
