= Elliot Park, Minneapolis =

Elliot Park
- Neighborhood
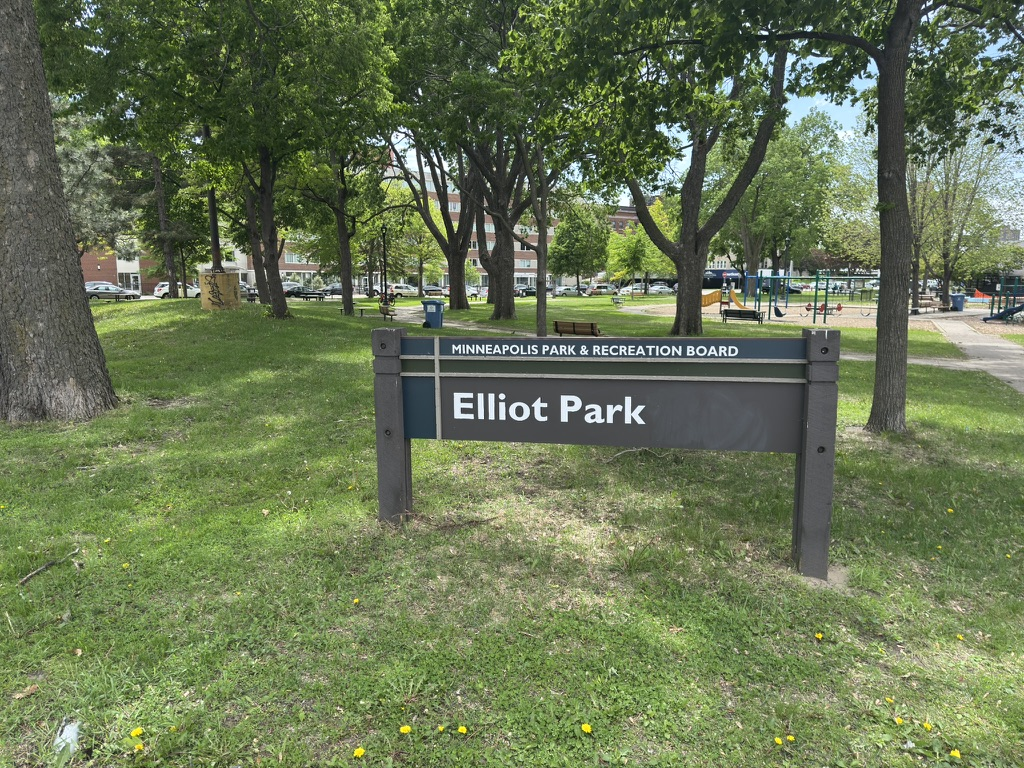
- Park of same name in 2025.

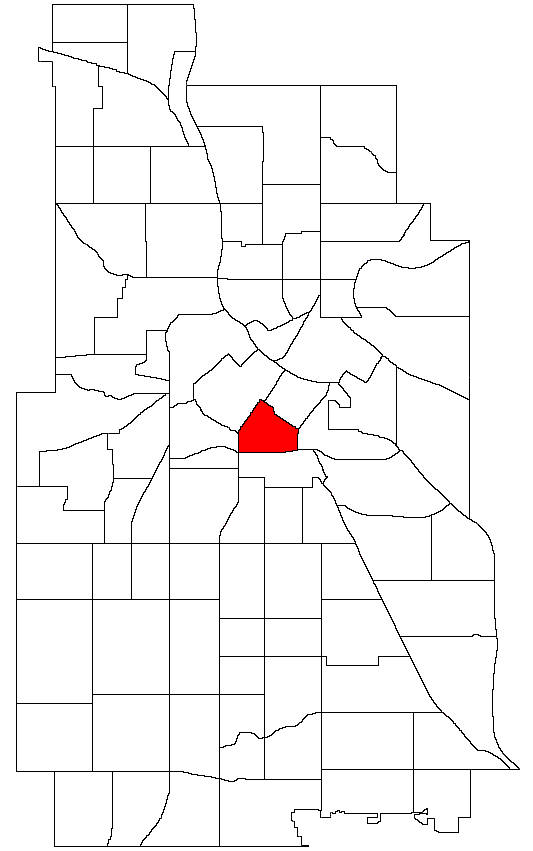
- Location of Elliot Park within the U.S. city of Minneapolis
- Interactive map of Elliot Park
- Coordinates: 44°58′10″N 93°15′45″W
- Country: United States
- State: Minnesota
- County: Hennepin
- City: Minneapolis
- Community: Central
- Founded: 1849
- City Council ward: 6

Government
  - Council member: Jamal Osman

Area
  - Total: 0.404 sq mi (1.05 km^{2})

Population (2020)
  - Total: 7,509
  - Density: 18,600/sq mi (7,180/km^{2})
- Time zone: UTC-6 (CST)
  - Summer (DST): UTC-5 (CDT)
- ZIP code: 55404, 55415
- Area code: 612

Historical population
Census	Pop.	Note	%±
1980	5,287		—
1990	5,678		7.4%
2000	6,476		14.1%
2010	6,693		3.4%
2020	7,509		12.2%

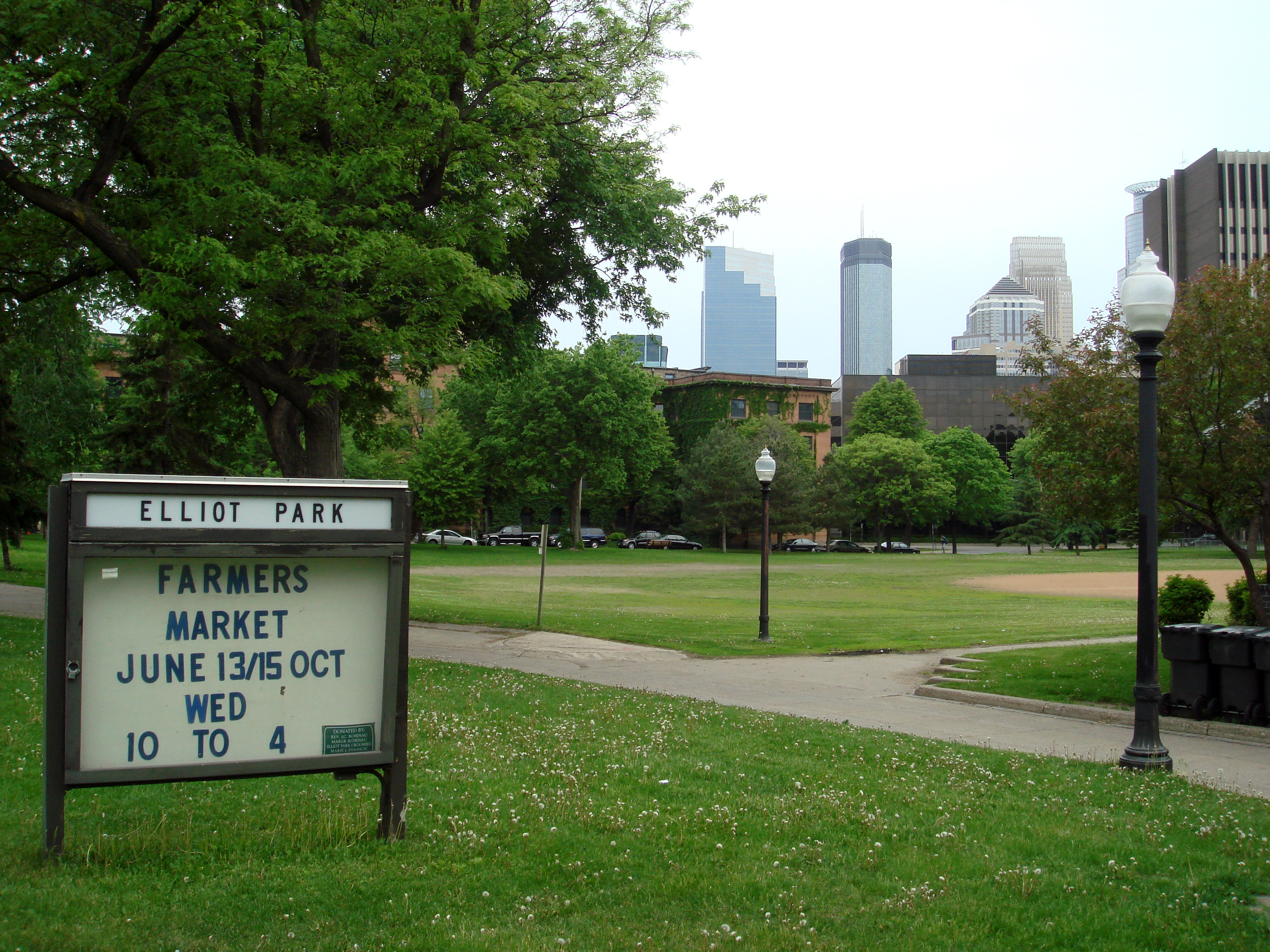
Elliot Park, at the center of the neighborhood of the same name

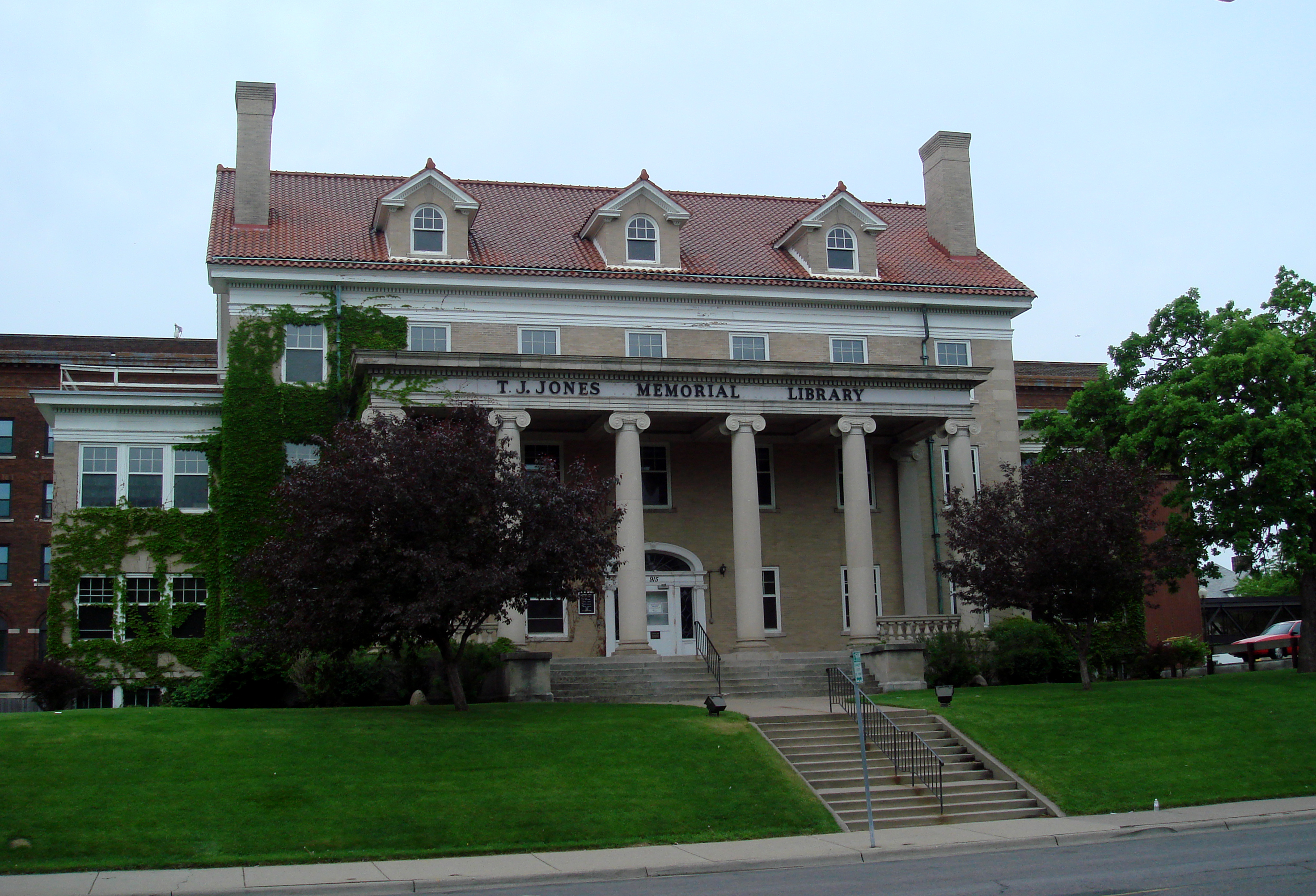
Jones Memorial Library, the prominent building of North Central University, faces Elliot Park.

Elliot Park is a neighborhood within the larger Central community in Minneapolis. It is part of Ward 6 of the Minneapolis City Council and state legislative district 61A.

== Location and characteristics ==
Elliot Park is bordered on the north by the Downtown West and Downtown East neighborhoods, on the west by Loring Park, on the east by Cedar-Riverside, and on the south by Phillips. Its official boundaries are 5th Avenue South to the northwest, 5th Street South to the northeast, Highway 55 to the east, the Interstate 94/Interstate 35W commons to the south, and 4th Avenue South to the west.

The neighborhood occupies both the Downtown Minneapolis street grid (running parallel to the Mississippi River) and the South Minneapolis street grid (running north–south and east–west), creating many triangular street corners where the two grids meet. It is mostly part of Ward 6 of the Minneapolis City Council; the only exception is one non-residential block in the northernmost corner of the neighborhood, which is in Ward 3.

It was the home of some of Minneapolis's wealthiest citizens in Minneapolis's early years. As the city grew and encompassed the neighborhood, most of the wealthy citizens left to build in more secluded neighborhoods like Lowry Hill and Kenwood. A few historic mansions and buildings from Minneapolis's early years can be found in some parts of Elliot Park.

== History ==
Elliot Park is one of Minneapolis's oldest neighborhoods, with plots set for housing as early as 1856. It was close to industrial developments on the nearby banks of the Mississippi River, which made it a popular settlement for early Swedish immigrants.

The namesake for the neighborhood is Mr. Joseph Elliot, an area physician, who donated his farm land to the city in 1893. This land is the site of the current Elliot Park, and another generous donation of Mr. Elliot resulted in the founding of Steele Park - these were the city's first two parks.

It began to rise to wealth near the end of the 19th century, as Downtown Minneapolis began to experience rapid growth. The neighborhood at that time had the city's only two parks, which made it a fashionable area to live in. Several large mansions sprang up along Park Avenue.

During the next twenty years, as the city began to grow more and more quickly, the character of the neighborhood began to change. The need for higher concentrations of people transformed the neighborhood into an area of three and four storey brick apartment buildings. Of these, the Rappahannock Condominiums are among the oldest in the city. Included are boston-esque brownstone buildings that connect Elliot Park to the core of downtown Minneapolis.

The area began to decline in wealth in the mid-20th century, as the high housing density attracted lower income families. The construction of the interstate system resulted in large areas of the city being gutted, and between 1950 and 1970 the population declined by almost 54%. The freeway construction also resulted in the relocation of several area businesses, which changed the character of the commercial sector, and resulted in a much higher transient population.

The neighborhood's historical contribution to Minneapolis remains significant. Two of the neighborhood's buildings are on the National Register of Historic Places: The First Church of Christ, Scientist on 15th Street and the Hinkle-Murphy House at 619 S 10th Street. The neighborhood has been home to North Central University since 1936.

By the turn of the century, the neighborhood has begun to quickly gentrify, with numerous, high priced luxury condos enriching the neighborhood's borders with the Central and Downtown East neighborhoods. The additions of Grant Park and the Skyscape condominiums have created a sudden increase in the young professional population in Elliot Park and has increased the appeal of Elliot Park as a downtown hot-spot for professionals seeking a cosmopolitan lifestyle. These additions, combined with the expansion of the Hennepin County Medical Center, have increased the attention on Elliot Park as a neighborhood undergoing significant redevelopment and gentrification.

== Demographics ==
Race/ethnicity
Race/ethnicity	2000		2010		2020	
Race/ethnicity	Number	%	Number	%	Number	%
White alone	3,194	49.32	3,526	52.68	3,790	50.47
Black alone	2,023	31.24	2,283	34.11	2,283	30.40
Hispanic or Latino (any race)	500	7.72	255	3.81	539	7.18
Native American alone	162	2.50	132	1.97	134	1.78
Asian alone	205	3.17	285	4.26	400	5.33
Other race alone	16	0.25	5	0.07	62	0.83
Pacific Islander alone	9	0.14	10	0.15	7	0.09
Two or more races	367	5.67	197	2.94	294	3.92
Total	6,476	100.0	6,693	100.0	7,509	100.0

== Notable residents ==
- Charles Schulz, cartoonist and creator of Peanuts, who resided at 919 Chicago Avenue (now demolished).
- J. Paul Getty, businessman and industrialist, who resided at 624 S. 9th Street.
