= Loring Park, Minneapolis =

Neighborhood in Minneapolis, Minnesota, United States

Loring Park
- Neighborhood
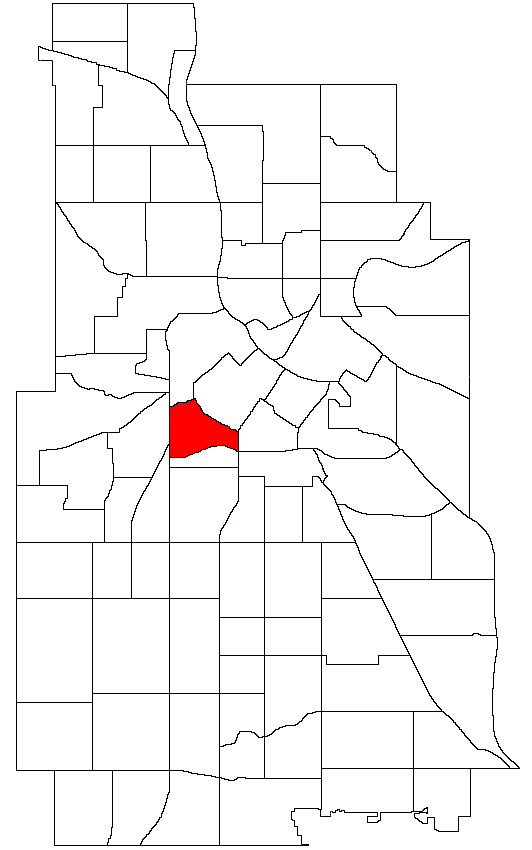
- Location of the Loring Park neighborhood within the U.S. city of Minneapolis
- Interactive map of Loring Park
- Coordinates: 44°58′12″N 93°17′02″W
- Country: United States
- State: Minnesota
- County: Hennepin
- City: Minneapolis
- Community: Central
- City Council Ward: 7

Government
  - Council Member: Elizabeth Shaffer

Area
  - Total: 0.452 sq mi (1.17 km^{2})
  - Land: 0.452 sq mi (1.17 km^{2})

Population (2020)
  - Total: 9,718
  - Density: 21,500/sq mi (8,300/km^{2})
- Time zone: UTC-6 (CST)
  - Summer (DST): UTC-5 (CDT)
- ZIP code: 55403, 55404
- Area code: 612

Historical population
Census	Pop.	Note	%±
1980	5,908		—
1990	6,586		11.5%
2000	7,501		13.9%
2010	7,873		5.0%
2020	9,718		23.4%

Loring Park is a neighborhood in the Central Community of Minneapolis, Minnesota. Located on the southwest corner of downtown Minneapolis, it also lends its name to Loring Park, the largest park in the neighborhood. The official boundaries of the neighborhood are Lyndale Avenue to the west, Interstate 394 to the north, 12th Street to the northeast, Highway 65 to the east, and Interstate 94 to the south. It is located in Minneapolis City Council Ward 7 and state legislative district 61A.

== Neighborhood characteristics ==
Loring Park is locally known for its diverse social environment and as a nexus for many arts and cultural events, boasting over 300 businesses and institutions. Loring Park hosts the annual Twin Cities Pride Festival and is the end location of the pride parade. The Loring Park District, according to its official site, offers the "quintessential urban lifestyle," a blend of "condominium and apartment living." The philosophy of the district is one of coalescence: it seeks to mix the old with the new, desiring to become quaint and charming through its combining of the modern with the "historic brownstone."

The Loring Greenway connects Nicollet Mall with Loring Park. The park is surrounded by apartment buildings, many dating from the early 1900s, although recent construction in the area has brought many new town homes and condominiums to the area. In 1972, the Loring Park Development District was created to use tax increment financing to demolish older apartment buildings in an approximately 10-block area and build new higher density buildings and commercial development, such as the Hyatt hotel on Nicollet. The Loring Greenway was created as part of this district. The neighborhood includes part of the Harmon Place Historic District.

=== Notable buildings ===
- The 19 Bar
- 430 Oak Grove
- Basilica of St. Mary
- St. Mark's Episcopal Cathedral
- Minneapolis Community and Technical College
- Minneapolis Convention Center

== Demographics ==
In the 2020 Census, 9,718 people lived in the Loring Park neighborhood. According to the 5-year American Community Survey (ACS) data for 2017-2021, 72% of residents were white, 10.9% were Black, 4.7% Asian, 4.6% two or more races, and 5.3% Hispanic or Latino. The neighborhood is majority renters. In the 2017-2021 ACS data, 68.6% of housing units were occupied by renters and 19.6% by owners. The average household size was 1.3 for both owners and renters.

Race/ethnicity
Race/ethnicity	2000		2010		2020	
Race/ethnicity	Number	%	Number	%	Number	%
White alone	5,888	78.50	5,858	74.41	6,303	65.23
Black alone	710	9.47	853	10.83	1,598	16.54
Hispanic or Latino (any race)	380	5.07	392	4.98	626	6.48
Native American alone	51	0.68	49	0.62	69	0.71
Asian alone	283	3.77	493	6.26	526	5.44
Other race alone	24	0.32	14	0.18	66	0.68
Pacific Islander alone	1	0.01	5	0.06	0	0.00
Two or more races	164	2.19	209	2.65	475	4.92
Total	7,501	100.0	7,873	100.0	9,663	100.0

== Gallery ==
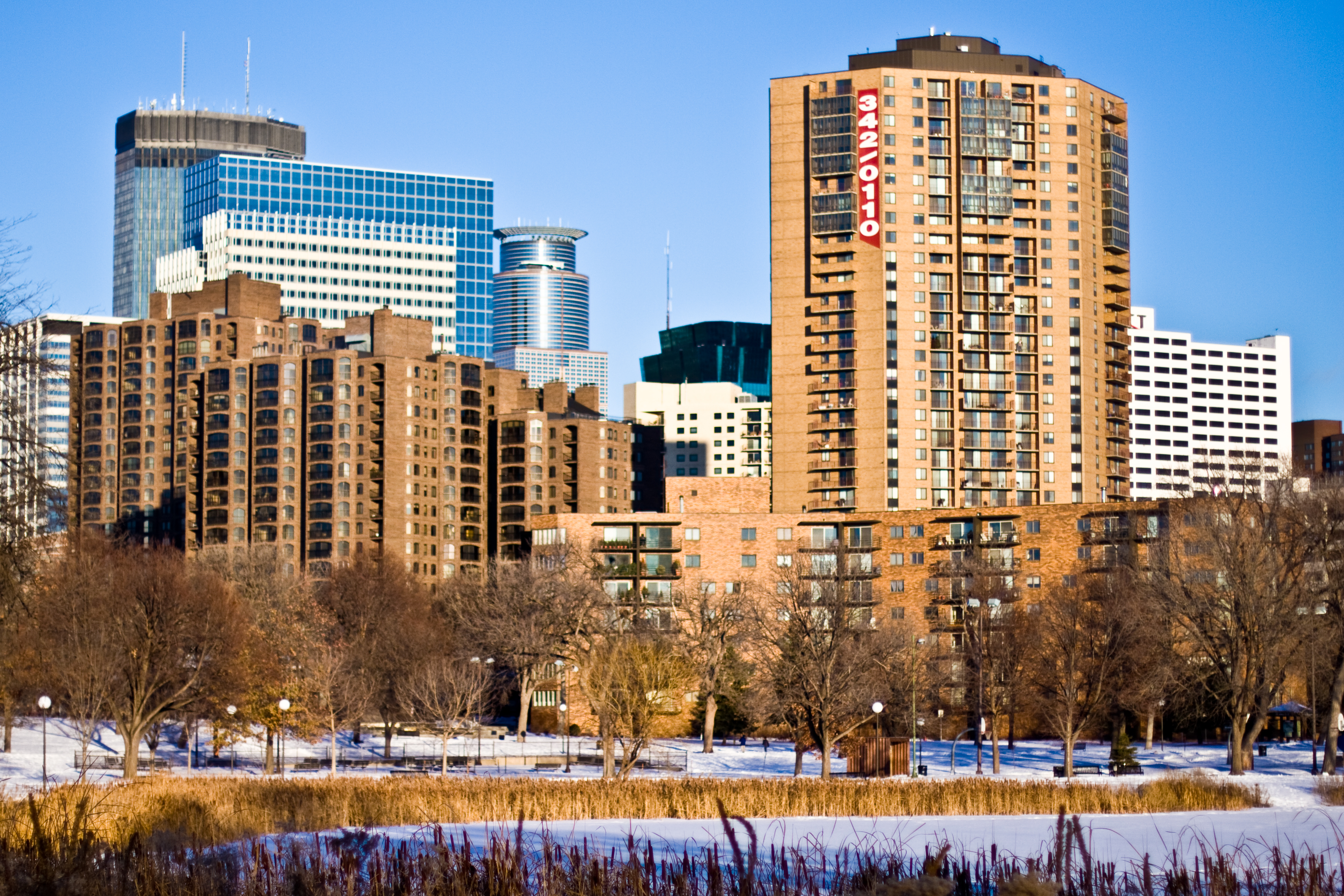
Downtown Minneapolis from Loring Park

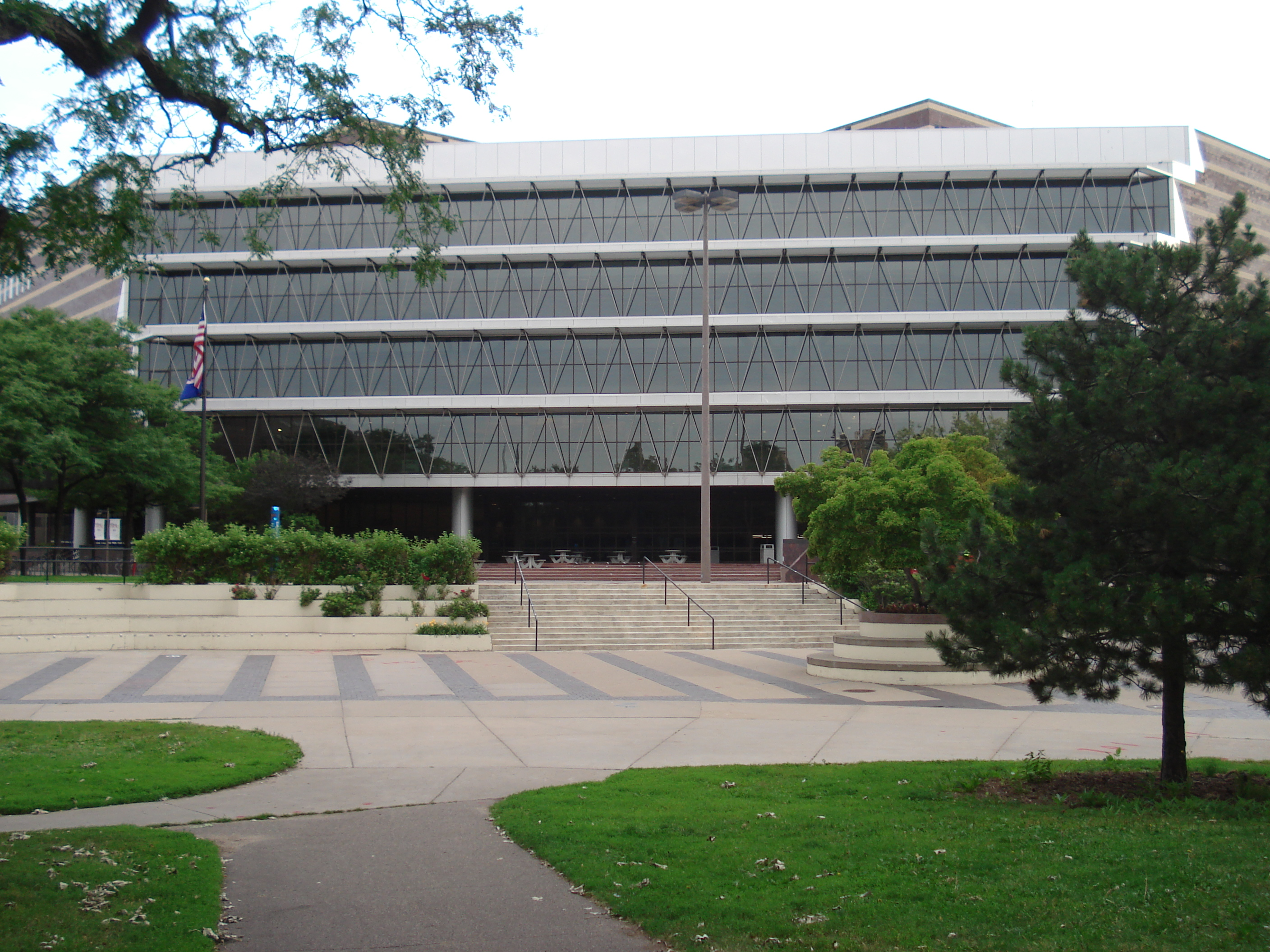
MCTC Technical Building

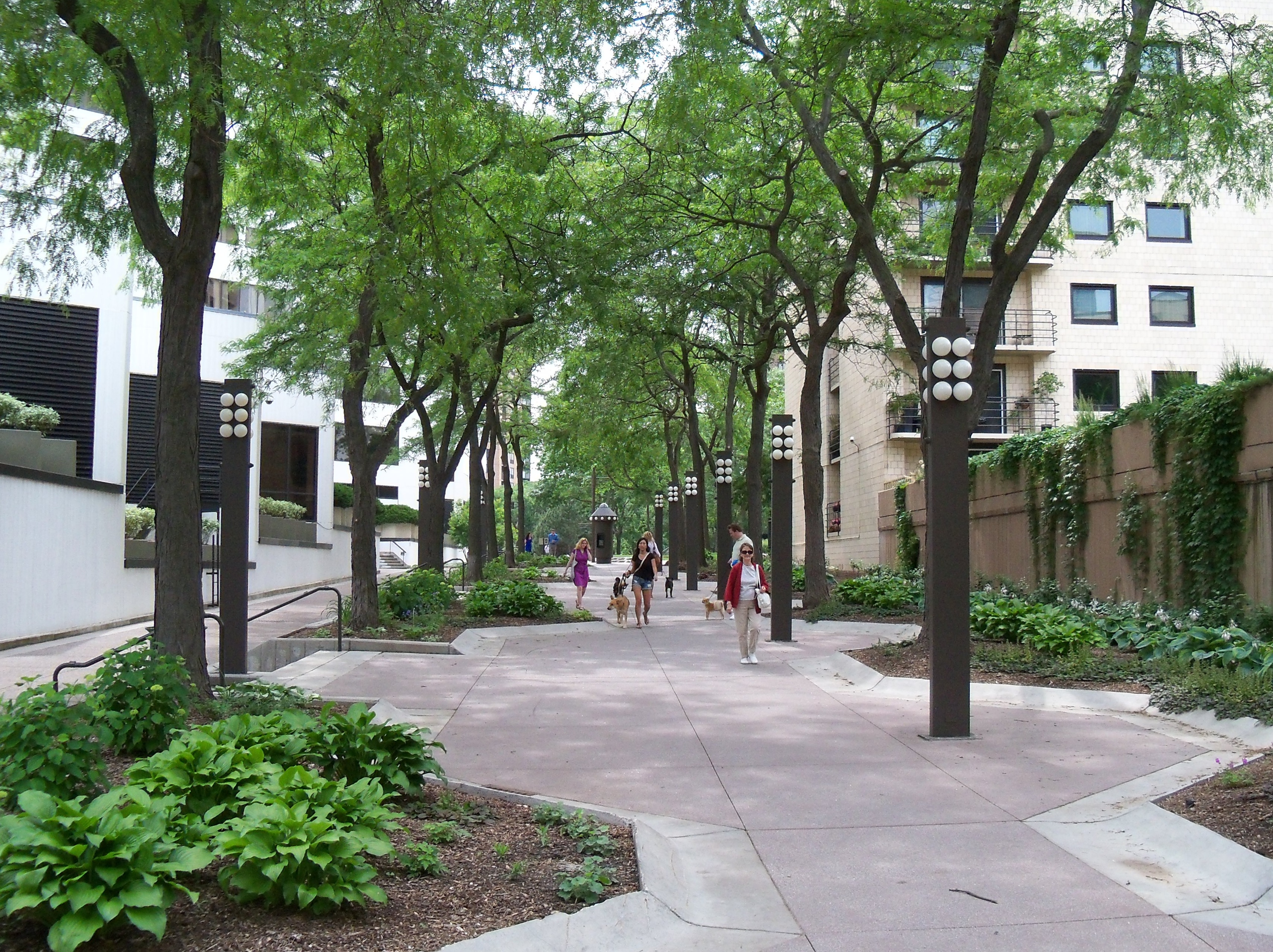
Loring Greenway - panoramio

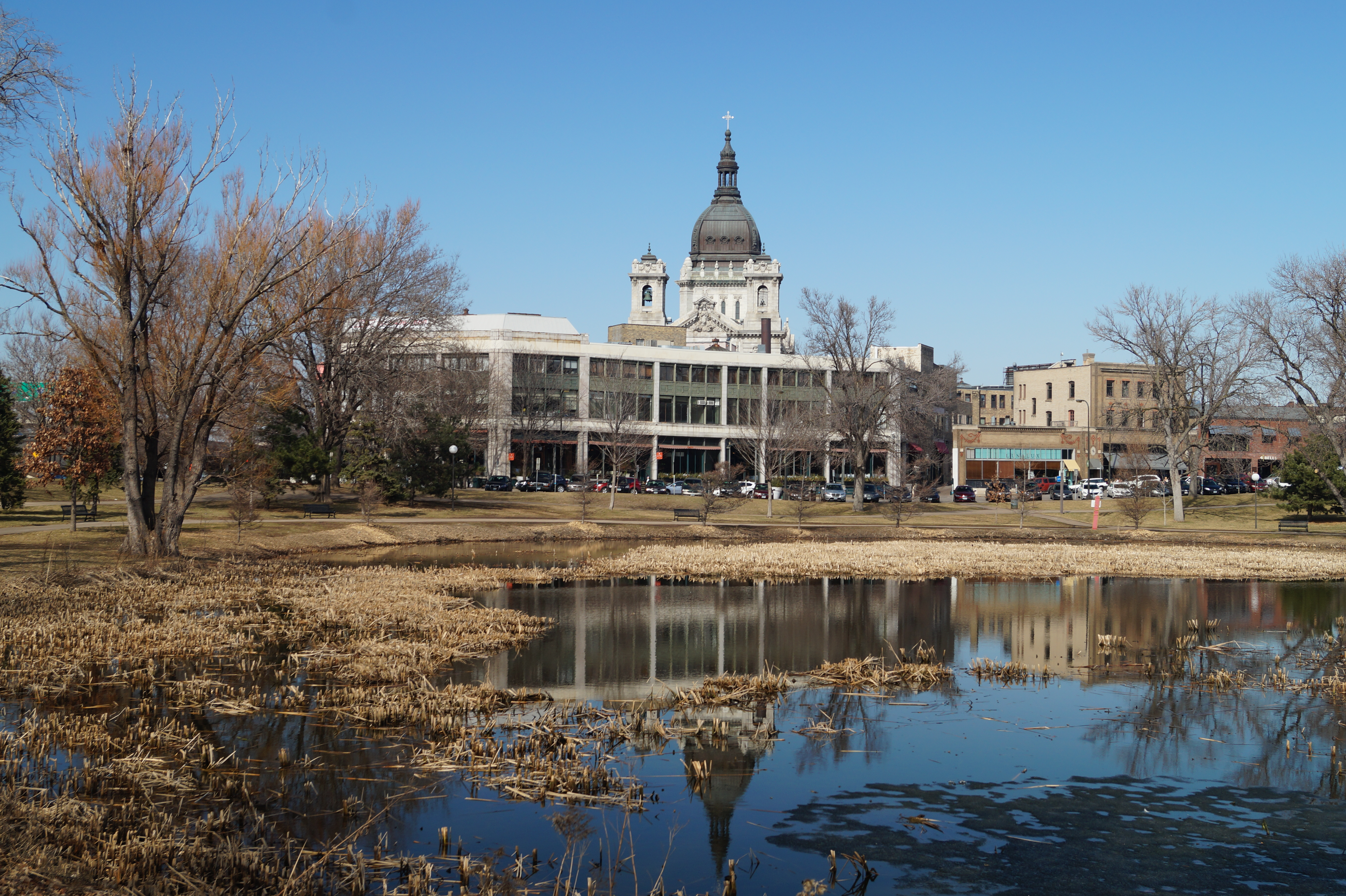
Loring Park (25650475142)

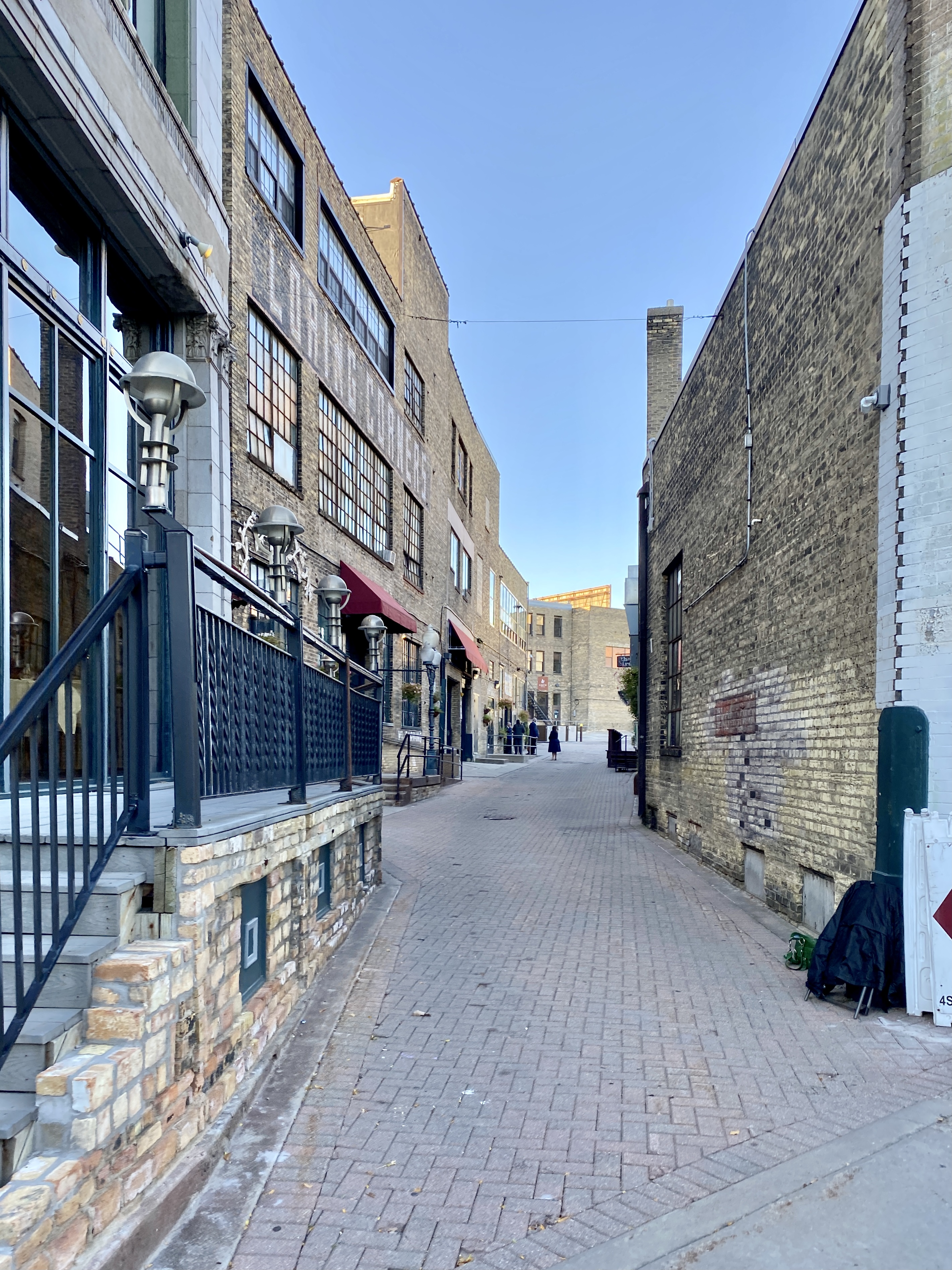
Loring Alley, Loring Park, Minneapolis, MN

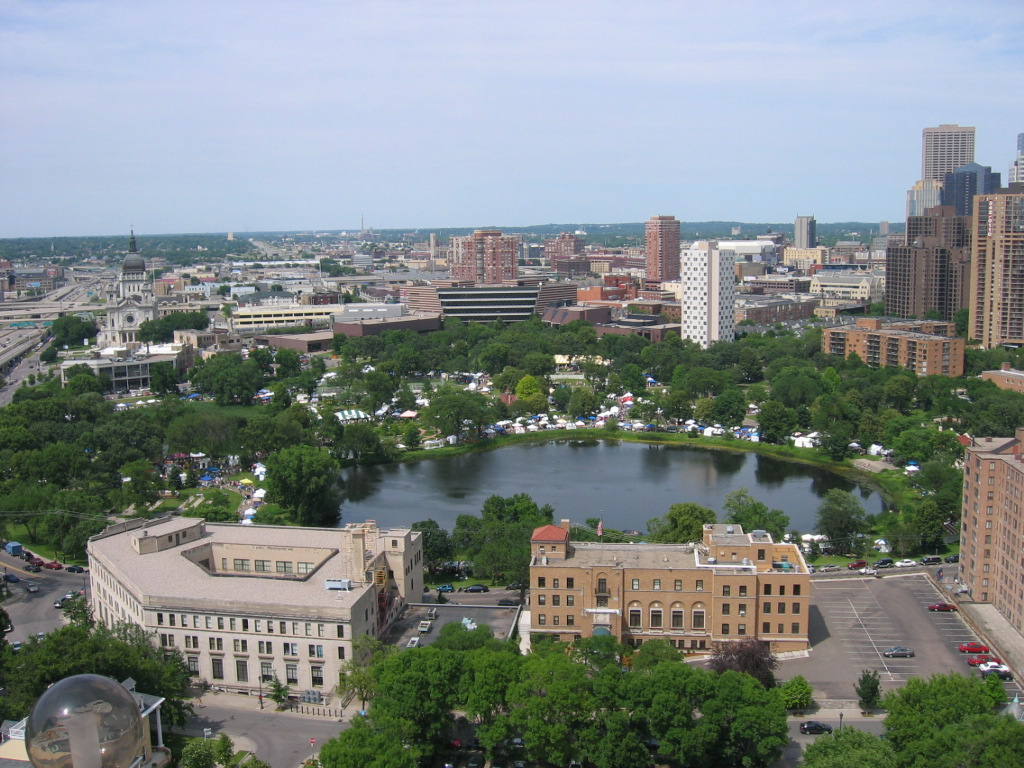
Loring Park Aerial

Racial composition	2020
White (non-Hispanic)	72.6%
Black or African American (non-Hispanic)	9.9%
Hispanic or Latino	5.0%
Asian (non-Hispanic)	5.3%
Other race (non-Hispanic)	n/a
Two or more races (non-Hispanic)	3.7%
