= Wells Fargo (disambiguation) =

Wells Fargo is a large financial services company and bank.

Wells Fargo may also refer to:

== Structures ==
- Wells Fargo Arena (disambiguation), several arenas
- Wells Fargo Building (disambiguation), various locations
- Wells Fargo Center (disambiguation), various locations
- Wells Fargo Pavilion, in the U.S. city of Sacramento, California
- Wells Fargo Plaza (disambiguation), various locations
- Wells Fargo Tower (disambiguation), various locations

== Other uses ==
- Wells Fargo (1852–1998), predecessor to the modern Wells Fargo, merged with Norwest Corporation in 1998
- Tales of Wells Fargo, an American Western television series that ran from 1957 to 1962
- Wells Fargo (film), a 1937 western movie starring Joel McCrea
- Wells Fargo Championship, a golf tournament sponsored by Wells Fargo
- "Wells Fargo", a song by Buddy, JID, Johnny Venus of EarthGang, and Guapdad 4000 from Dreamville's collaborative mixtape Revenge of the Dreamers III
- Wells Fargo (band), a Zimbabwean funk-rock band from the 1970s
