= List of tallest buildings in Colorado Springs =

Coordinates: 38.8339°N 104.8214°W

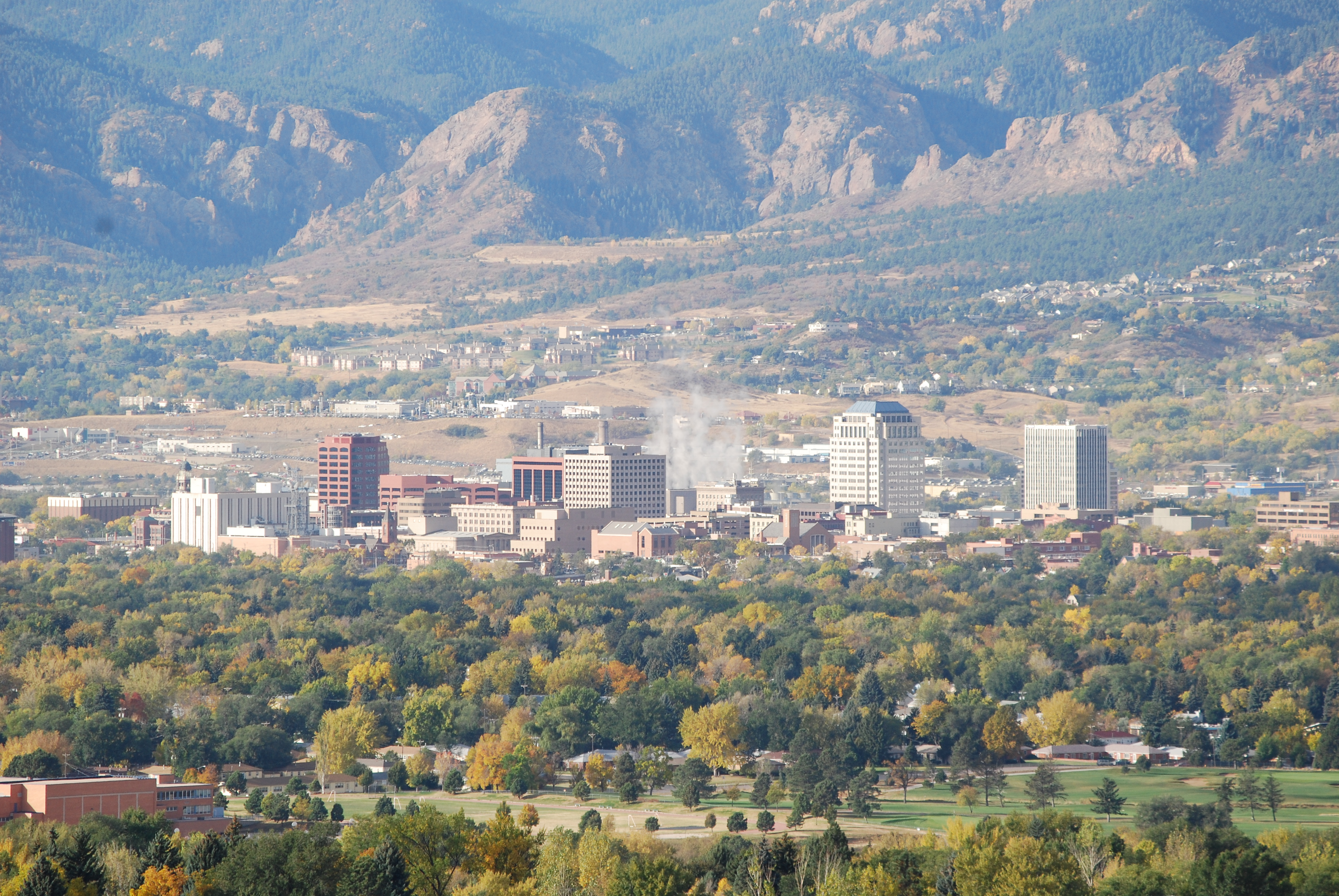
Colorado Springs Skyline

This is a list of the tallest buildings in the City of Colorado Springs, Colorado, United States. The tallest is the Wells Fargo Tower, which at 247 feet (75 m) is the tallest building in the state of Colorado outside the Denver metropolitan area.

== Tallest multistory buildings ==
Below is a list of the tallest multistory (3+) buildings in Colorado Springs with heights over 100 feet (30 m).

Rank	Name	Image	Height (ft)	Height (m)	Floors	Year	Notes
1	Wells Fargo Tower		247	75	16	1990	Tallest building in Colorado Springs since its completion in 1990.
2	FirstBank Building		201 (≈)	61.3 (≈)	14	1966	Was the tallest building in Colorado Springs between 1966-1990. Formerly known as the "Holly Sugar building."
3	Plaza of the Rockies South Tower		193 (≈)	58.8 (≈)	13	2001	
4	Colorado Square		185 (≈)	56.4 (≈)	14	1976	
5	Alamo Corporate Center		170 (≈)	51.8 (≈)	9	1983	
6	Penrose Hospital		163 (≈)	49.7 (≈)	12	1959	Was the tallest building in Colorado Springs between 1959-1966.
7	Phoenix Tower		160 (≈)	48.8 (≈)	12	1975	
8	The Broadmoor Main		154 (≈)	46.9 (≈)	9	1918	Was the tallest building in Colorado Springs between 1918-1959.
9	Satellite Hotel		148 (≈)	45.1 (≈)	14	1968	
10	Antlers Hilton Hotel		147 (≈)	44.8 (≈)	14	1967	Formerly known as the "Antlers Doubletree Hotel."
11	Old El Paso County Courthouse		147 (≈)	44.8 (≈)	3	1903	Was the tallest building in Colorado Springs between 1903-1918.
12	Qwest Communications Building		145 (≈)	44.2 (≈)	7	?	
13	Great Wolf Lodge		140 (≈)	42.7 (≈)	10	2016	
14	Pikes Peak Towers		134 (≈)	40.8 (≈)	14	1967	
15	Hilton Garden Inn		128 (≈)	39 (≈)	10	2019	
16	The Broadmoor South		126 (≈)	38.4 (≈)	9	1961	
17	CityWalk Downtown Lofts		122 (≈)	37.2 (≈)	13	1962	
18	Memorial Hospital Central		121 (≈)	36.9 (≈)	7	1997	
19	Plaza of the Rockies North Tower		120 (≈)	36.6 (≈)	8	1984	
20	Centennial Plaza Apartments		116 (≈)	35.4 (≈)	11	1979	
21	Regency Tower		115 (≈)	35.1 (≈)	11	1965	
22	St. Francis Medical Center		115 (≈)	35.1 (≈)	7	2008	
23	The Broadmoor West Tower		113 (≈)	34.4 (≈)	7	1995	
24	The Broadmoor West		112 (≈)	34.1 (≈)	7	1975	
25	US Bank Building		112 (≈)	34.1 (≈)	8	1909	
26	City Administration Building		109 (≈)	33.2 (≈)	7	1980	
27	The Broadmoor West Residences		107 (≈)	32.6 (≈)	6	2006	
28	Medalion Retirement Community		105 (≈)	32 (≈)	10	1961	

== Tallest non-multistory buildings ==
Below is a list of the tallest non-multistory (<3 stories) buildings in Colorado Springs with known heights.

Rank	Name	Height ft / m	Floors	Year	Notes
1	United States Air Force Academy Cadet Chapel	150 / 46	2	1963	
2	St. Mary's Cathedral	148 / 45	2	1902	

=== Cancelled buildings ===
Rank	Name	Height ft / m	Floors	Year	Notes
1	Cooper Tower	257 / 78	22	2010	Would have been the tallest building in Colorado Springs, however project was canceled after developer filed for bankruptcy protection.

== See also ==
- Bibliography of Colorado
- Geography of Colorado
- History of Colorado
- Index of Colorado-related articles
- List of Colorado-related lists
- Outline of Colorado
