= Wells Fargo Center =

Wells Fargo Center may refer to:

- Wells Fargo Center (Los Angeles), California
- Wells Fargo Center (Sacramento), California
- Wells Fargo Center (San Francisco), California
- Wells Fargo Center for the Arts, Santa Rosa, California
- Wells Fargo Center (Denver), Colorado
- Wells Fargo Center (Miami), Florida
- Wells Fargo Center (Tampa), Florida
- Wells Fargo Center (Minneapolis), Minnesota
- Wells Fargo Plaza (Billings), Montana
- One Wells Fargo Center, Charlotte, North Carolina
- Two Wells Fargo Center, Charlotte, North Carolina
- Three Wells Fargo Center, Charlotte, North Carolina
- Wells Fargo Center (Charlotte), North Carolina
- Wells Fargo Center (Winston-Salem), North Carolina
- Wells Fargo Center (Portland, Oregon), the tallest building in Oregon
- Wells Fargo Center (Philadelphia), Pennsylvania, a multi-purpose indoor sports arena now known as Xfinity Mobile Arena
- Wells Fargo Center (Salt Lake City), Utah
- Wells Fargo Center (Norfolk), one of the tallest buildings in Norfolk, Virginia
- DocuSign Tower, known as Wells Fargo Center until 2020, Seattle, Washington
- 1 Independent Square (Jacksonville), known as Wells Fargo Center until 2024, Jacksonville, Florida

== See also ==
- Wells Fargo (disambiguation)
- Wells Fargo Arena (disambiguation)
- Wells Fargo Building (disambiguation)
- Wells Fargo Plaza (disambiguation)
- Wells Fargo Tower (disambiguation)
