= Metropolitan Miami =

Metropolitan Miami may refer to:

- South Florida metropolitan area, also known as the Miami metropolitan area
- Metropolitan Miami (development), a mixed-use development in Downtown Miami

== See also ==
- Miami Metro (disambiguation)
