= Miami Metro =

Miami Metro may refer to:

- Miami metropolitan area
- Metrorail (Miami), the heavy rail transit system serving the immediate Miami area

== See also ==
- Metropolitan Miami (disambiguation)
