= Wells Fargo Plaza =

Wells Fargo Plaza may refer to:

- Wells Fargo Plaza (Billings), Montana
- Wells Fargo Plaza (Bloomington), Minnesota
- Wells Fargo Plaza (El Paso), Texas
- Wells Fargo Plaza (Houston), Texas
- Wells Fargo Plaza (Phoenix), Arizona
- Wells Fargo Plaza (San Diego), California
- Wells Fargo Plaza (Tacoma), Washington

== See also ==
- Wells Fargo Building (disambiguation)
- Wells Fargo Center (disambiguation)
- Wells Fargo Tower (disambiguation)
