= 8500 Tower =

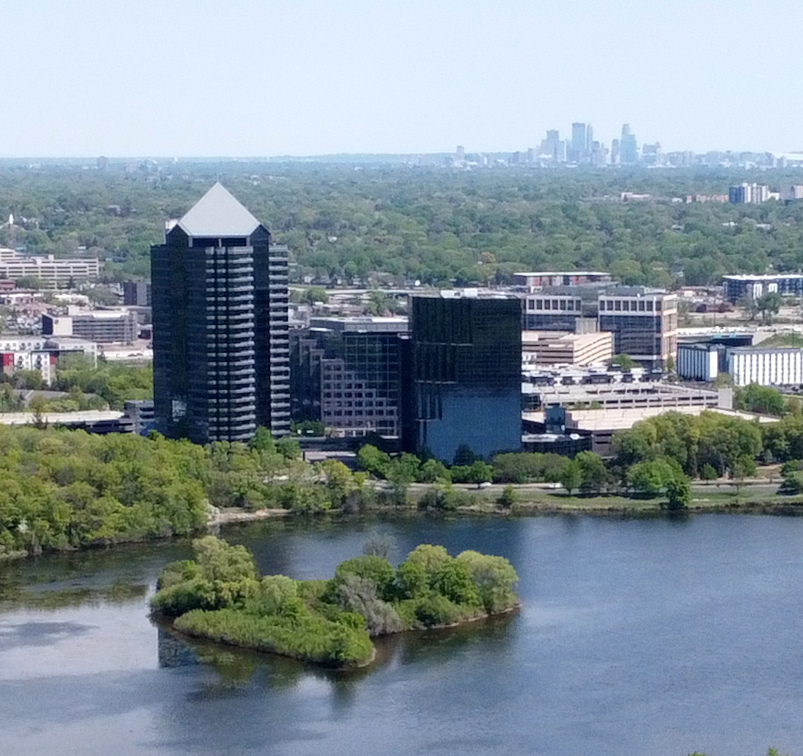
- 8500 Tower (left) from Normandale Lake with Minneapolis in background
- Interactive map of 8500 Tower

General information
- Status: Completed
- Type: Office
- Location: 5800 84th Street West, Bloomington, Minnesota
- Coordinates: 44°51′13″N 93°21′24″W
- Completed: 1988

Height
- Roof: 381 ft (116 m)

Technical details
- Floor count: 24

Design and construction
- Architect: Wilson/Jenkins Assoc.
- Main contractor: M.A. Mortenson Co.

Website
- property.jll.com/listings/normandale-8500-tower-8500-normandale-lake-blvd-southwest

The 8500 Tower is a 24-story high-rise office skyscraper in the city of Bloomington, Minnesota. It stands at a height of 381 feet, making it the 27th-tallest building in the state of Minnesota. It is also the tallest building in Bloomington, as well as in all of the suburban Minneapolis-St. Paul metropolitan area.

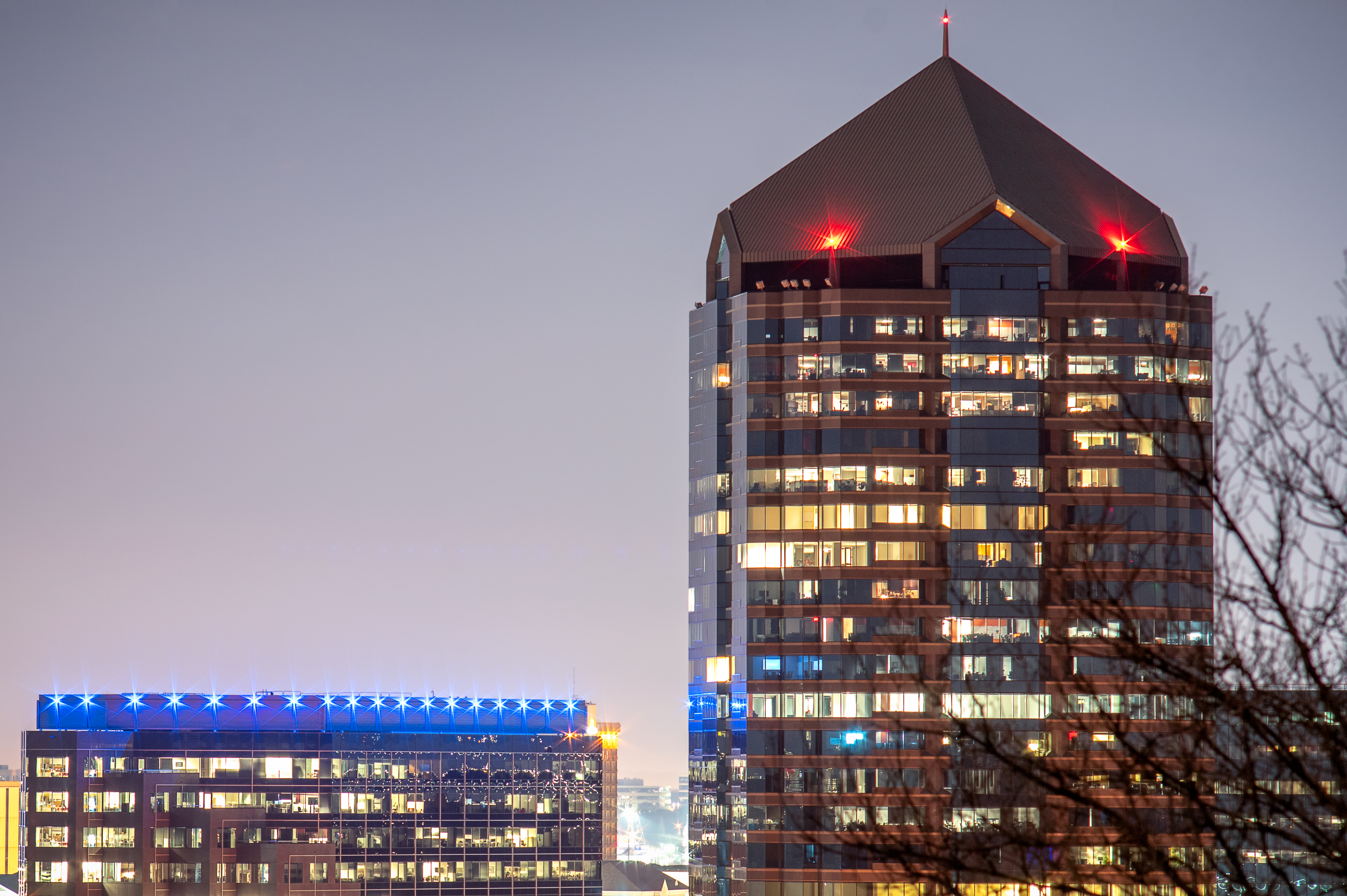
8500 Tower at night

The building is part of the Normandale Lake Office Park, a five-building office complex located on the north end of Normandale Lake. The complex is considered to be at the center of "downtown" Bloomington - the business district that runs along the southern side of Interstate 494.

The building, along with the rest of Normandale Lake Office Park, was owned by Equity Group Investments from 2012 to 2014, when it was sold to MetLife. The sale was speculated to be the largest in the history of the Twin Cities metropolitan area, though an exact price was not publicly disclosed. In 2019, the property was again put up for sale.

Preceded by Wells Fargo Plaza	Tallest Building in Bloomington, Minnesota; 1988—Present; 381 ft	Succeeded by None

== See also ==
- List of tallest buildings in Minnesota
