= Wells Fargo Tower =

Wells Fargo Tower may refer to:

- Wells Fargo Tower (Birmingham), Alabama
- Wells Fargo Tower (Colorado Springs), Colorado
- Wells Fargo Tower (Fort Worth, Texas)
- Wells Fargo Tower (Roanoke), Virginia

== See also ==
- Wells Fargo Building (disambiguation)
- Wells Fargo Center (disambiguation)
- Wells Fargo Plaza (disambiguation)
- Harborplace Tower, which earned the nickname Wells Fargo Tower after Wells Fargo arrived in September 2024
