= Met 3 =

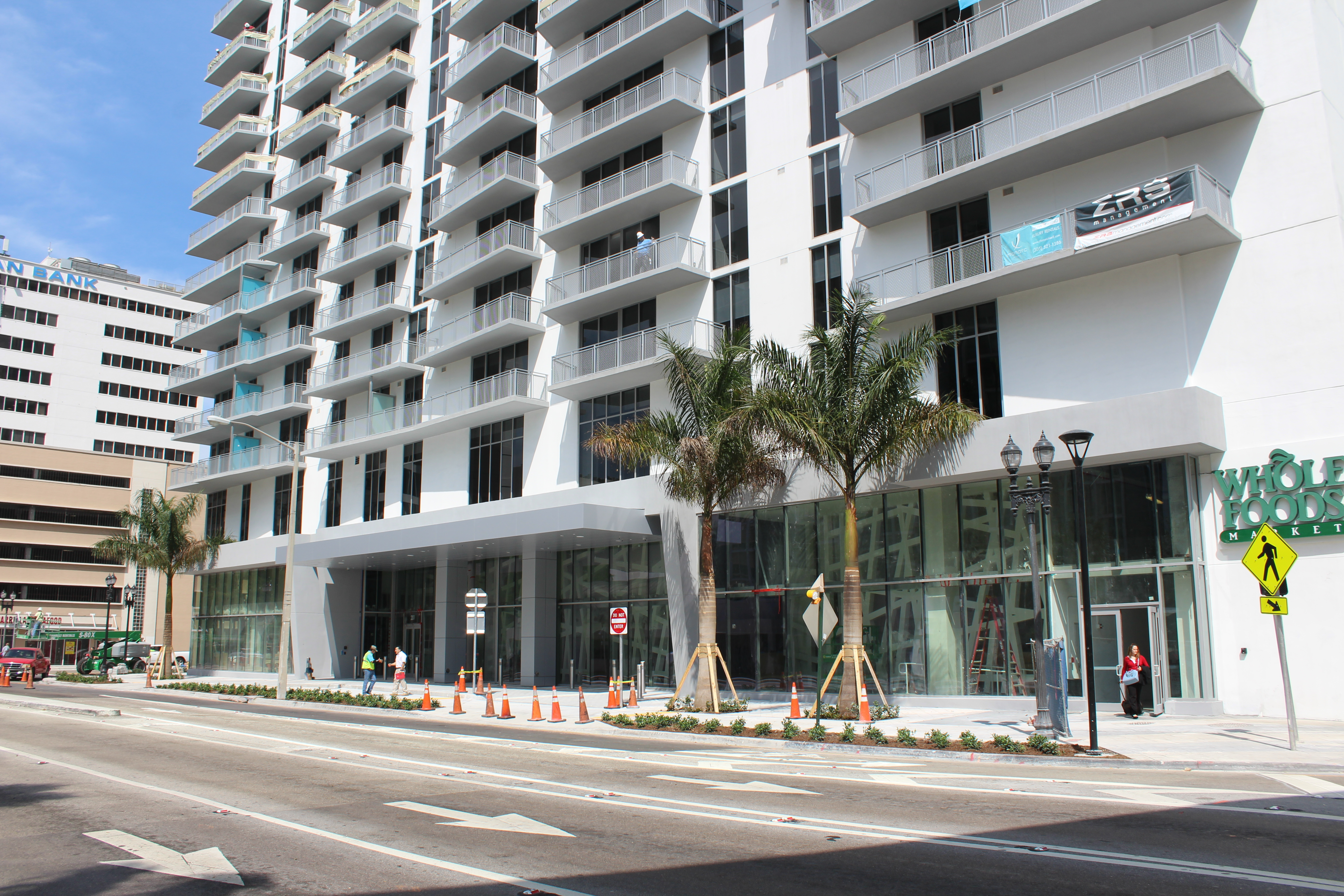
- Whole Foods at base in early 2016
- Interactive map of the Met 3 area

General information
- Status: Complete
- Type: Residential
- Location: 250 Southeast 3rd Avenue, Miami, Florida, United States
- Coordinates: 25.771364°N 80.188608°W
- Construction started: December 2011
- Completed: January 14, 2015

Height
- Roof: ~349 ft (106 m)

Technical details
- Floor count: 32

Design and construction
- Developer: MDM Development Group

Met 3 is part of Metropolitan Miami, a complex of four skyscrapers in the central business district of Downtown Miami, Florida, United States. Met 3 was proposed as the tallest of the four towers, was originally under construction during the 2000s real estate bubble and planned for completion in 2011. However, the project was put on hold. By 2011 construction had never gotten past site preparation, until the new design finally began construction in December 2011.

If completed as originally proposed, the 828 feet Met 3 would have been the tallest building in Miami and the state of Florida. It would have contained 76 floors, which would have also made it the tallest building in the United States south of New York City in terms of floor count. In total height, it would have also been the tallest residential building south of New York, consisting of residential condominium units, passing the Four Seasons Hotel Miami, which holds that distinction currently.

== History ==
The Metropolitan Miami project gained attention due to NBA star Shaquille O'Neal's involvement in the project. He formed the O'Neal Group, a building-development company. The Metropolitan Miami project is the group's first.

In 2008 supermarket chain Whole Foods joined the lease for a location on the ground level of Met 3. The bottom of Met 3, including Whole Foods, and the separate Met Square shopping center, are set to begin construction in the summer of 2011. The Met 3 base is supposed to be built such that the Met 3 tower could later be built on top.

Groundbreaking began on Met 3 in December 2011 with Whole Foods still committed to the project despite multiple delays.

== Gallery ==
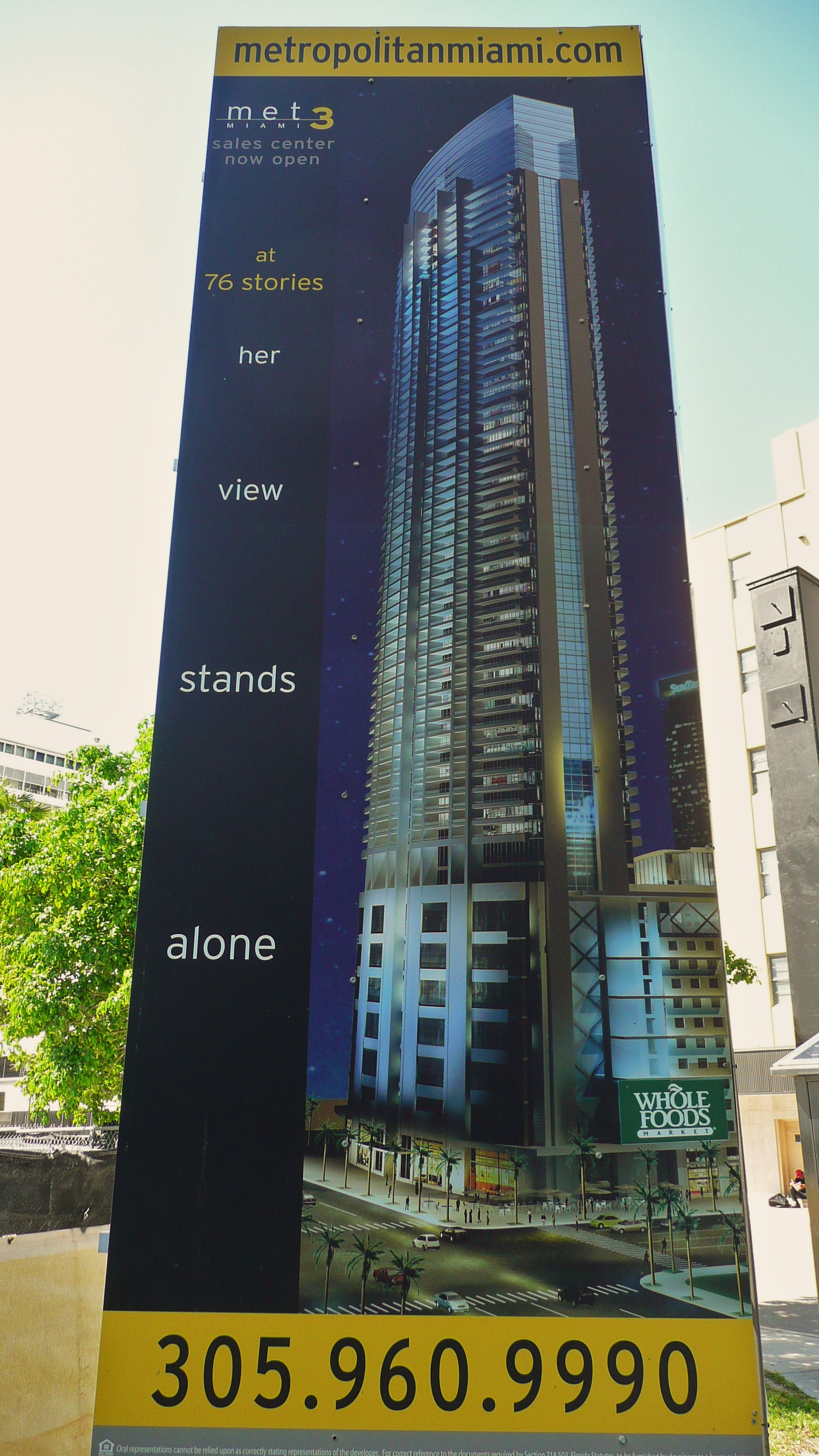
Sign at the Met 3 site depicting finished tower

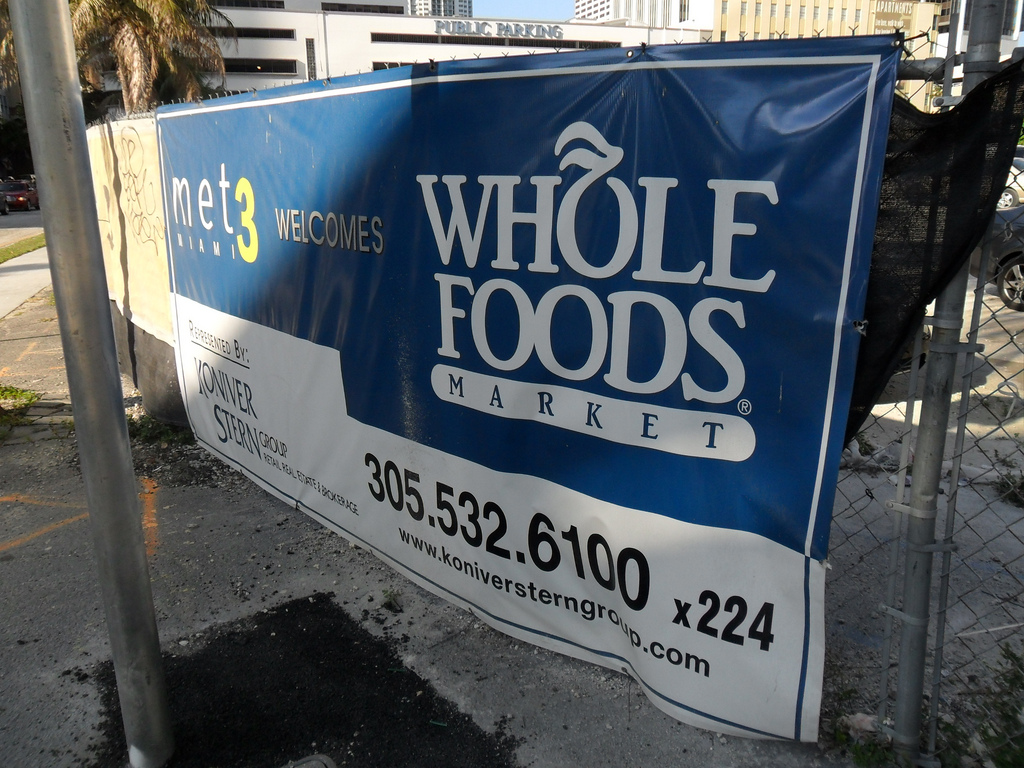
Whole Foods sign at the Met 3 site in March 2011

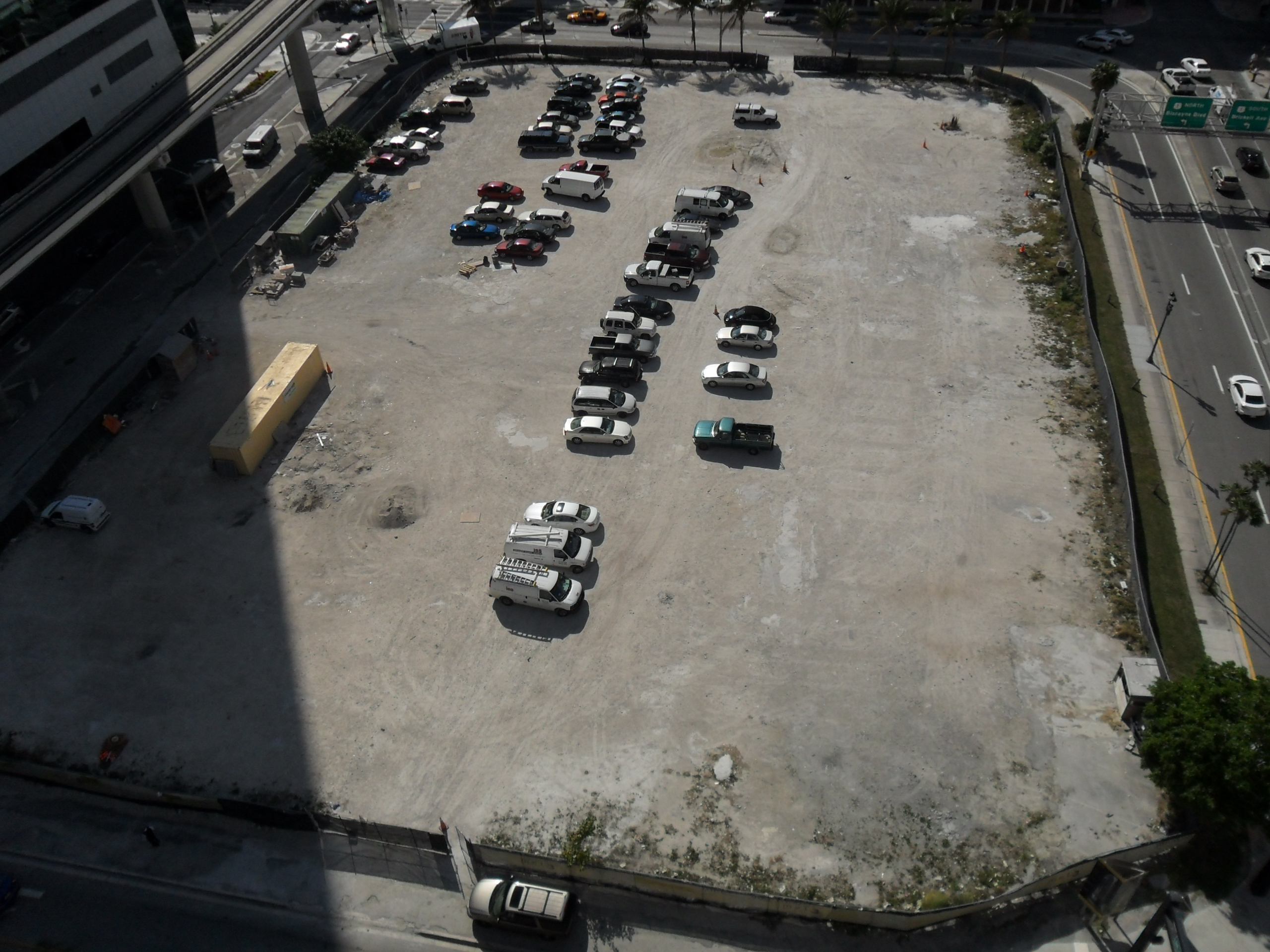
Met 3 site from above in March 2011

== See also ==
- Metropolitan Miami (development)
- Met 1
- Met 2 Marriott Marquis
- Wells Fargo Center (Miami)
- List of tallest buildings in Miami
