= Met 1 =

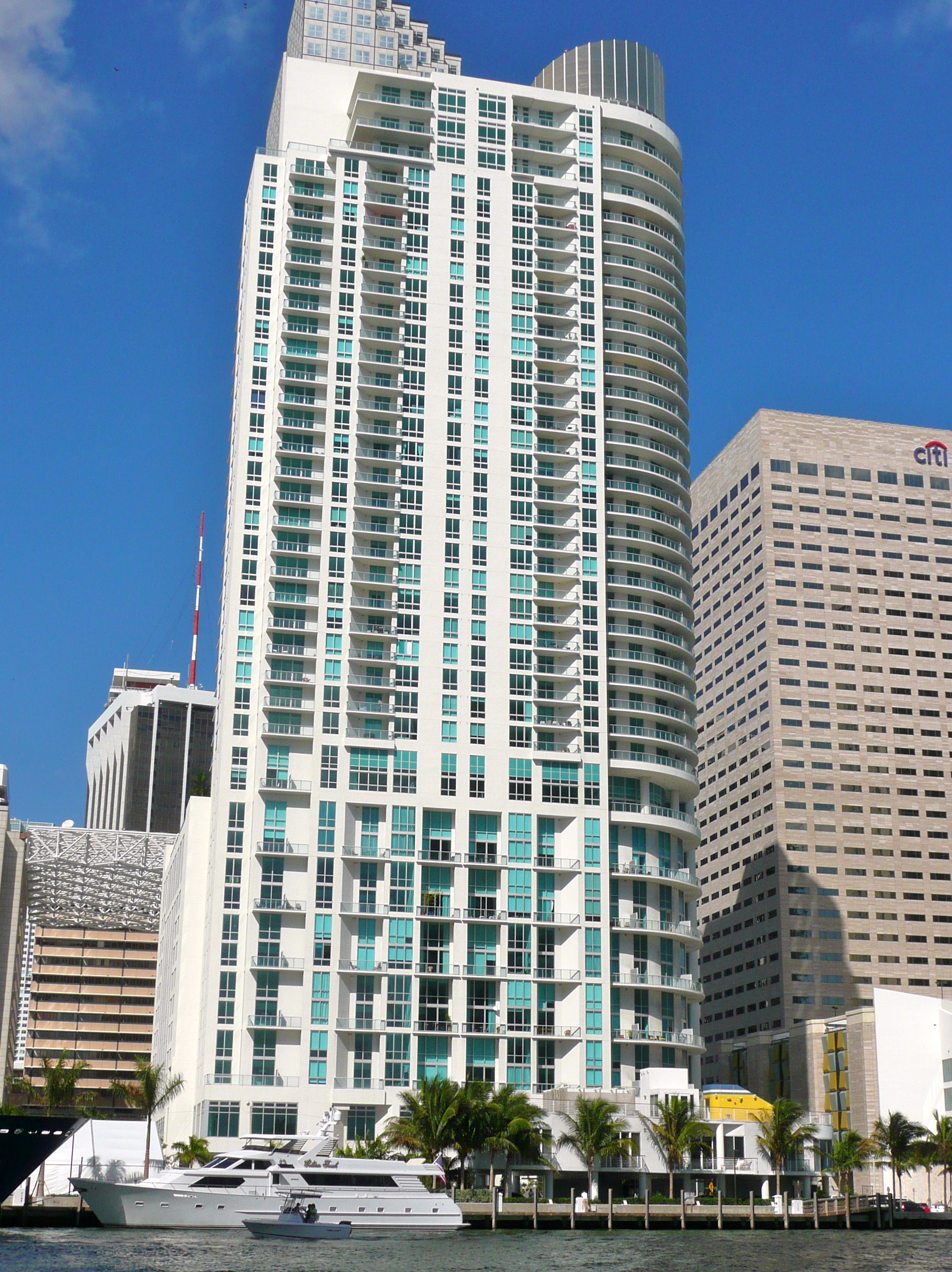
- Met 1
- Interactive map of the Met 1 area

General information
- Type: Residential
- Location: 300 South Biscayne Boulevard, Miami, Florida, United States
- Coordinates: 25.771364°N 80.188608°W
- Construction started: 2004
- Completed: 2007
- Opening: 2007

Height
- Roof: 440 ft (130 m)

Technical details
- Floor count: 40

Design and construction
- Developer: MDM Development Group

Met 1 is a residential skyscraper located in the Metropolitan Miami complex in the central business district of Downtown Miami, Florida, United States.

Met 1 was the first building to be completed in the complex. Completed in 2007, the building rises 40 stories and 440 feet (130 m). It is a residential building, designed to supplement the much larger Met 3 tower, of which it is similar architecturally.

The Metropolitan Miami project has gained attention due to NBA star Shaquille O'Neal's involvement in the project. He formed the O'Neal Group, a building-development company. The Metropolitan Miami project is the group's first.

== Gallery ==
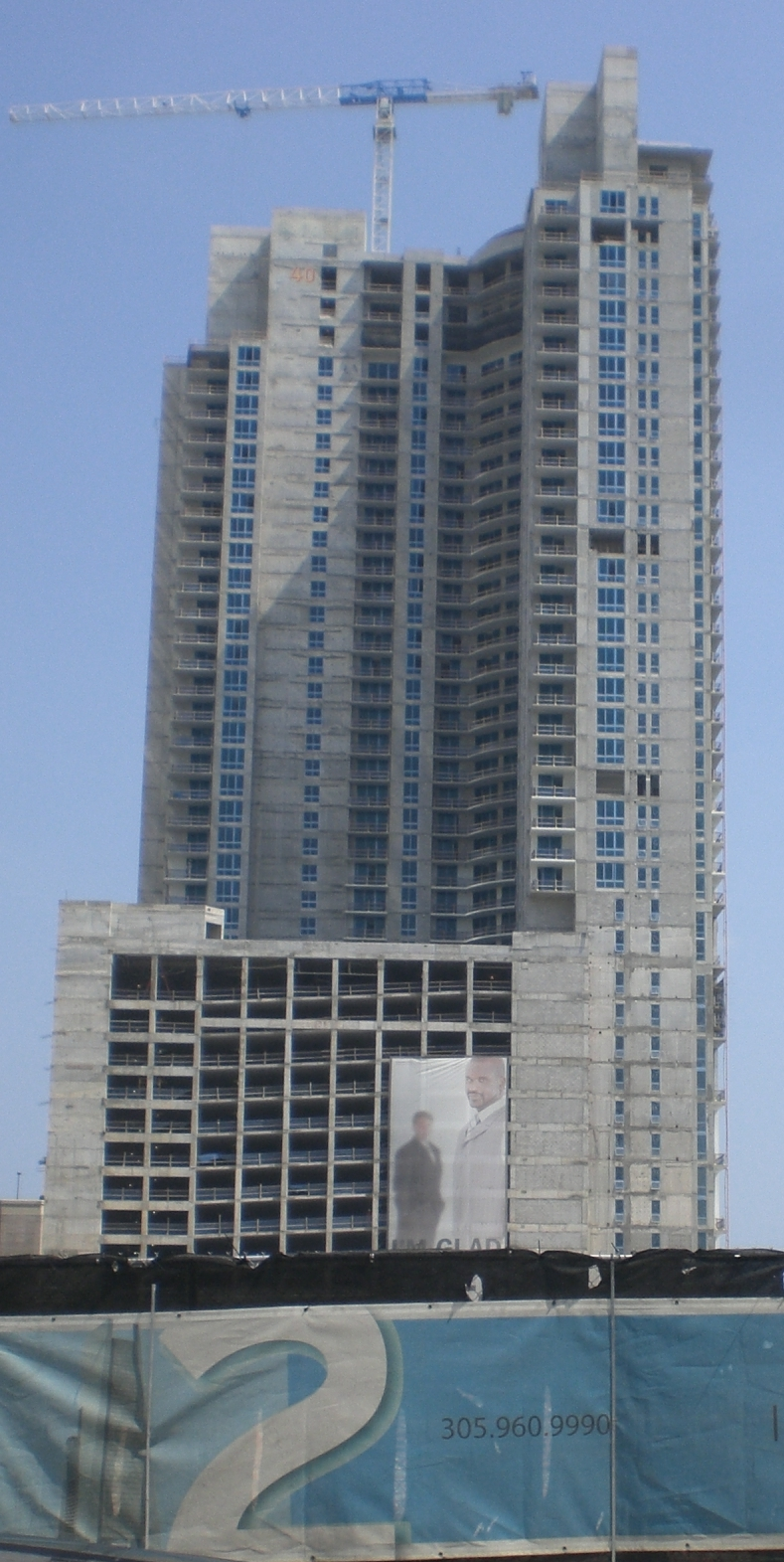
The Metropolitan Miami Tower #1 as it nears completion 3/2/2007.

== See also ==
- Metropolitan Miami (development)
- Met 2 Marriott Marquis
- Wells Fargo Center (Miami)
- Met 3
- List of tallest buildings in Miami
