= JW Marriott Marquis Miami =

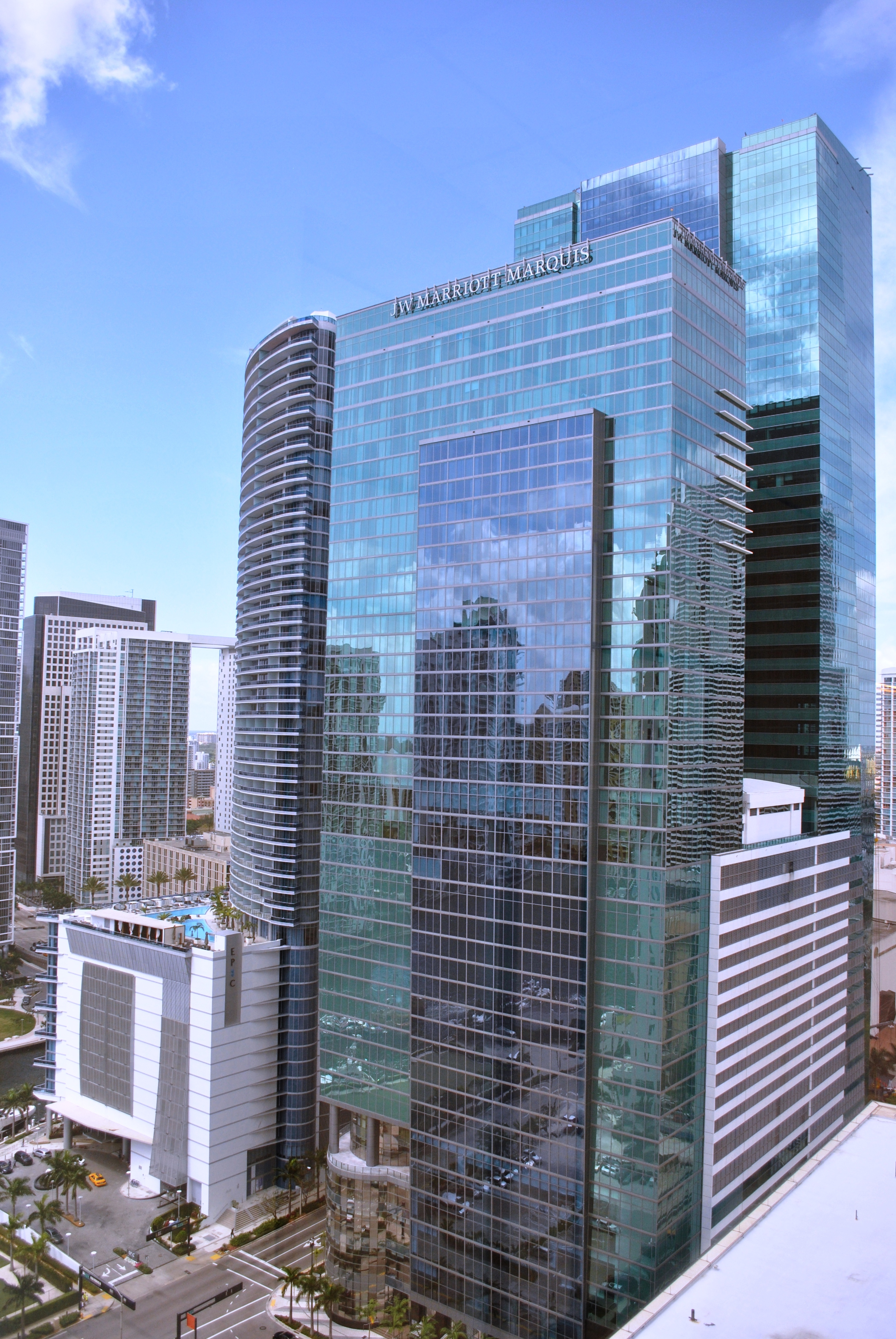
- Interactive map of the JW Marriott Marquis Miami area

General information
- Status: Completed
- Type: Hotel
- Location: 255 Biscayne Blvd Way, Miami, Florida, United States
- Coordinates: 25.771364°N 80.188608°W
- Construction started: 2006
- Completed: 2010
- Opening: 2010

Height
- Roof: 502 ft (153 m)

Technical details
- Floor count: 41

Design and construction
- Developer: MDM Development Group

JW Marriott Marquis Miami is a luxury hotel located in Downtown Miami, Florida, United States. The hotel is situated in the $1 billion new Metropolitan Miami development Metropolitan Miami complex along with the Hotel Beaux Arts Miami.

== Overview ==
The hotel tower shares a parking garage with the adjoining 47-story office tower, Wells Fargo Center. The two towers were completed in October 2010. The first-to-market JW Marriott Marquis property has 313 guestrooms, including 56 suites, along with a broad array of amenities, including renowned chef-restaurateur, Daniel Boulud's db Bistro Moderne. Offering a diverse setting for business, meeting and pleasure travel pursuits, the 41-story hotel features three concierge levels; 80,000-square-feet of total function space including a 20,000 sq. ft. Grand Ballroom; and a most unusual indoor sports, lifestyle and entertainment complex in any hotel in the U.S. The 50,000-square-foot, two-story indoor facility includes an NBA-approved basketball arena, tennis court, Mariano Bartolome indoor Golf School, virtual bowling alley, billiards, Rina Yoga studio, enliven: a full-service salon & spa and much more.

The JW Marriott Marquis Miami is the first JW Marriott Marquis hotel to premiere in the JW Marriott Hotels property portfolio, the second one opened in 2013 in Dubai, UAE. Dubai, UAE.

== See also ==
- Metropolitan Miami (development)
- Met 1
- Wells Fargo Center (Miami)
- Met 3
- List of tallest buildings in Miami
