= Wells Fargo Arena =

Wells Fargo Arena may refer to:

- Wells Fargo Arena (Des Moines, Iowa), on the grounds of the Iowa Events Center, now known as Casey's Center
- Wells Fargo Arena (Tempe, Arizona), on the campus of Arizona State University, now known as Desert Financial Arena
- Wells Fargo Arena (Dothan, Alabama)

== See also ==
- Wells Fargo Center (disambiguation)
