= Holly Sugar Corporation =

Former sugar company in the United States

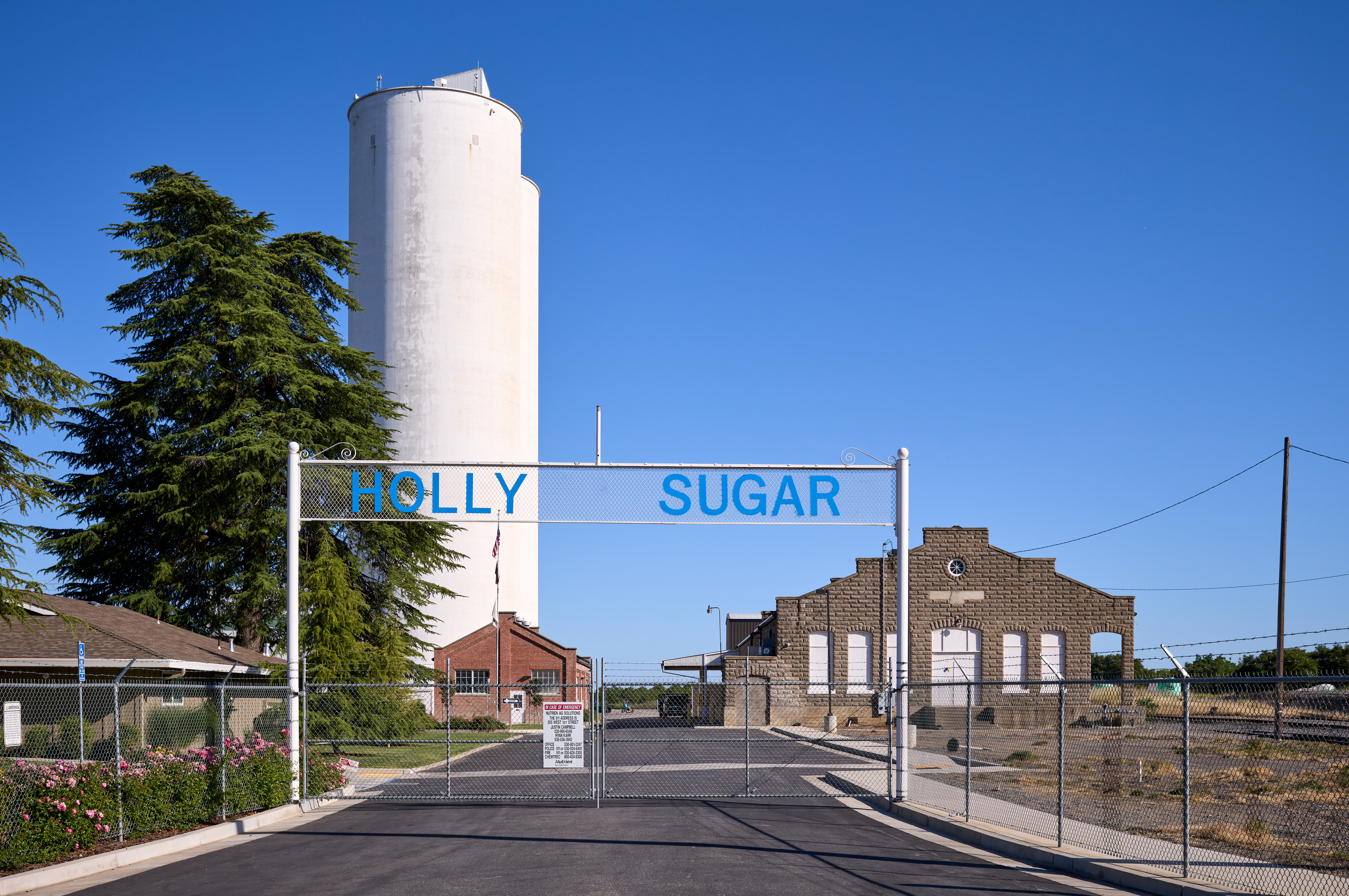
- The former Holly Sugar Plant in Hamilton City, California.
- Formerly: Imperial Holly (1987-1999)
- Type: Independent corporation (1905-1987), Subsidiary (1987-2005)
- Industry: Food industry
- Founded: 1905; 121 years ago
- Founder: Kenneth Schley
- Defunct: 2005
- Fate: Merged with Spreckels Sugar Company
- Headquarters: Denver; Colorado City, Colorado; Sugar Land, Texas, United States
- Area served: Colorado, Wyoming, Montana, Texas, California
- Key people: A. E. Carlton
- Products: White sugar
- Parent: Imperial Sugar (1987-2005)
- Divisions: Holly Seed

The Holly Sugar Corporation was an American beet sugar-producing corporation. Founded in 1905 in Holly, Colorado, it expanded during the first half of the 20th century, opening a number of beet sugar refineries in Colorado, Wyoming, Montana, Texas, and California, and becoming the largest independent processor of beet sugar in the United States. As beet sugar production would shrink in the latter part of the 20th century, the size of the company declined somewhat, and it was acquired by Imperial Sugar in 1987. It was later merged into Spreckels Sugar Company, a wholly owned subsidiary of the Southern Minnesota Beet Sugar Cooperative (SMBSC). Until its closure in 2025, Spreckels operated a single factory in Brawley, California, that had originally belonged to Holly Sugar. The trademark rights for the Holly Sugar were retained by Imperial Sugar, though as of 2025, Holly Sugar is not sold as a retail or wholesale brand.

== History ==
The Holly Sugar Corporation was founded in 1905 by Kenneth Schley in Holly, Colorado, in the sugar beet-growing region of the Eastern Plains of Colorado. After the growth of sugar production at its Holly plant, the company expanded with a new factory in Swink, Colorado. The original plant at Holly closed in 1915. Initially headquartered in Denver, the company was purchased in 1916 by A. E. Carlton, who had earlier made his fortune in gold mining at Cripple Creek. The company relocated its headquarters to Colorado Springs in 1923. In 1967, Holly Sugar moved into the city's first high-rise, the 14-story Holly Sugar Building, which became a downtown landmark.

In 1911, Holly Sugar expanded into southern California by acquiring and enlarging a factory in Santa Ana and building another in Huntington Beach. In 1926, the company expanded into northern California through acquisition of the Alameda Sugar Company with factories in Union City and Tracy, California. By 1931, the company had established or acquired eleven more factories across Wyoming, Texas, and Montana, becoming the largest independent processor of beet sugar in the United States. However, declining sugar beet production led to the closure of its factories in Swink in 1959, in Union City in 1975, and Santa Ana in 1982.

In 1987, the corporation was acquired by Imperial Sugar, becoming the Imperial Holly Corporation. The headquarters of the company was moved to Sugar Land, Texas in 1989 and the company's office in Colorado Springs was closed in 1997. In 1996, Imperial Holly purchased the Spreckels Sugar Company and merged it into its Holly Sugar subsidiary. Imperial Holly rebranded its remaining California plants as Spreckels Sugar Company operations after the merger and over the next several years, sold off its remaining Holly Sugar refineries in the Mountain states. The parent company returned to the name Imperial Sugar in 1999. However, the Holly Seed division in Sheridan, Wyoming would continue as a division of the company.

In 2001, Imperial filed for bankruptcy and in 2005, they sold the Holly Sugar Corporation (including Holly Seed) to the Southern Minnesota Beet Sugar Cooperative (SMBSC), but retained the trademark to the Holly Sugar brand. SMBSC then rebranded the Holly Sugar Corporation as Spreckels Sugar Company. Holly Seed closed down in 2021. As of 2025, a former Holly Sugar plant in Brawley, California is still operated by the Spreckels Sugar Company, its sole remaining operation. In April 2025, SMBSC announced the decommissioning and closure of the Brawley factory by early 2026.

The original Holly Sugar Building in Colorado Springs, briefly renamed for the Vanion Corporation in 2001, is now known as the FirstBank Building and remains a landmark in Colorado Springs.
