= Wells Fargo Plaza (Bloomington) =

Building in Bloomington, Minnesota

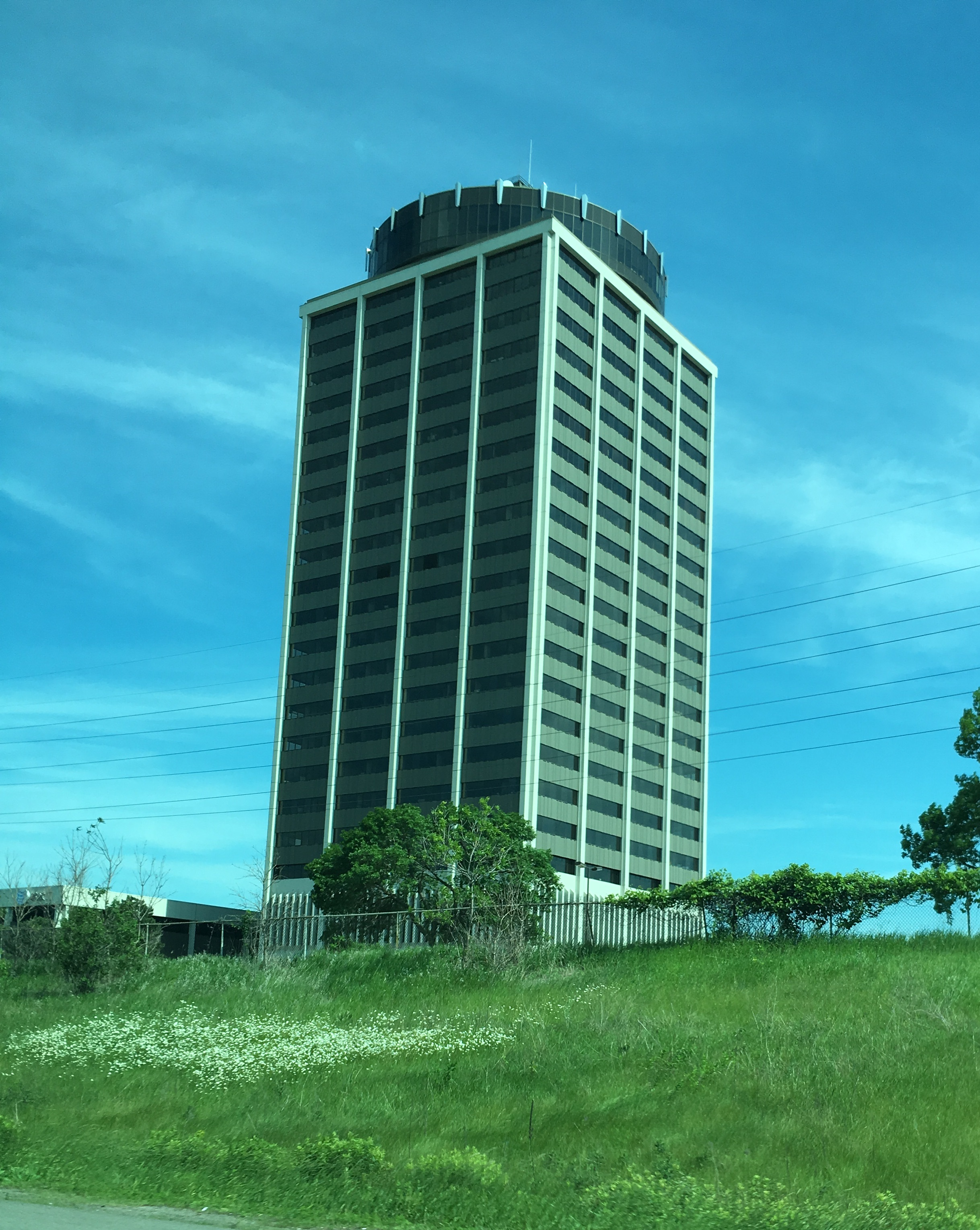
- Interactive map of the Wells Fargo Plaza area

General information
- Architectural style: Modernist
- Location: Bloomington, Minnesota, United States, 7900 Xerxes Ave. S.
- Coordinates: 44.8595139°N 93.3231734°W
- Completed: 1974
- Height: 300ft

Technical details
- Floor count: 24

Design and construction
- Developer: Rauenhorst Corporation

Website
- www.wellsfargoplazamn.com

Wells Fargo Plaza is a high-rise office tower complex located at 7900 Xerxes Avenue in Bloomington, Minnesota in the United States. Standing at 300 feet with 24 stories of Class A rated office space, the main tower is considered one of the more dominant landmarks of Interstate 494. The tower connects to an auxiliary three story building through a central atrium.

The tower was originally proposed in 1969 by the Rauenhorst Corporation. At the time, the plans included a revolving restaurant and a heliport. The Plaza was built in 1974. A turntable was installed for the revolving restaurant, but in 1977, the Rauenhorst Corporation converted the top floor into office space, as they could not find a restaurant tenant.

It is currently the 56th tallest building in Minnesota, and was the tallest in Bloomington until 1988, when it was surpassed by the 8500 Tower. It earned a TOBY award in 2012 from the Building Owners and Managers Association of Minneapolis.

After extensive renovations in 2010, the plaza was put up for sale in July 2015. DRA Advisors bought the property in November of that year for $46.25 million, and owned the building through a joint fund with City Center Realty Partners. In September 2024, an entity associated with Prime Finance purchased the property for $40 million.

== See also ==
- List of tallest buildings in Minnesota

Preceded by Radisson South Building	Tallest Building in Bloomington, Minnesota; 1974—1988; 300 ft	Succeeded by 8500 Tower
