= Wells Fargo Building =

Wells Fargo Building may refer to:

- Wells Fargo Building (Denver, Colorado), a Denver Landmark
- Wells Fargo Building (Englewood, Colorado)
- Wells Fargo Building (Davenport, Iowa)
- Wells Fargo Building (Portland, Oregon)
- Wells Fargo Building (Philadelphia), Pennsylvania
- Wells Fargo Building (Lubbock, Texas)

== See also ==
- Wells Fargo Center (disambiguation)
- Wells Fargo Plaza (disambiguation)
- Wells Fargo Tower (disambiguation)
