= FirstBank Building =

Building in Colorado, United States

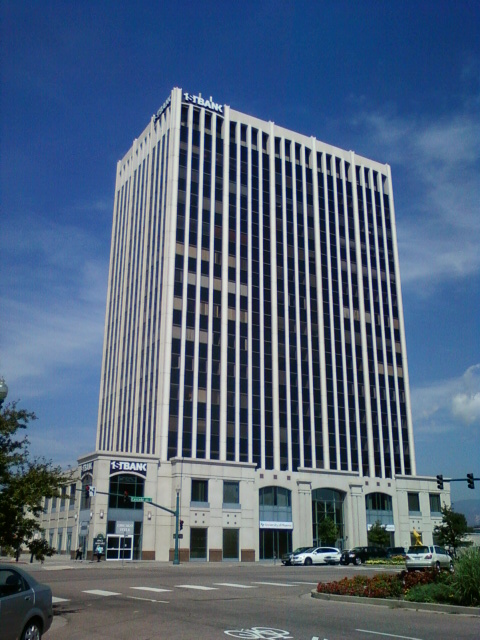
- Interactive map of the FirstBank Building area

General information
- Status: Completed
- Type: Office
- Location: 2 N. Cascade Ave. Colorado Springs, Colorado, U.S.
- Coordinates: 38°50′04″N 104°49′33″W
- Opening: 1967

Technical details
- Floor count: 14

FirstBank Building, part of the Palmer Center Complex, is a class A high-rise office building in Colorado Springs, Colorado. It is the second tallest building in Colorado Springs, and the second tallest building outside of the Denver metropolitan area. The building was known as the Holly Sugar Building when Holly Sugar Corporation was headquartered there.
