= Metropolitan Miami (development) =

Architectural structure

Coordinates: 25.771364°N 80.188608°W

Metropolitan Miami is a mixed-use development consisting of four skyscrapers in the central business district of Downtown Miami, Florida. It was considered at the time one of the largest mixed-use project in the city’s history, given its scope and budget. Developed by M.D.M. and designed by Nichols Architects, the project was divided into 4 phases that were developed over a period of 15 years.

The first phase, known as Met 1, consists of a 40-story, 447-unit condominium tower with views of Brickell Key and Biscayne Bay. It was completed in 2008 and features over 30,500 square feet of commercial space on the first two levels. This stage went relatively undisturbed, with most press reporting on Shaquille O'Neal participation on the development, in a joint venture with M.D.M. Development Group.

The second phase of development, initially known as Met 2, has become the Wells Fargo Center after a 20-year lease for 250,000 sq foot of office space was signed in 2010. This phase comprises two prominent towers, the first, Wells Fargo Center, has 47 stories, encompassing 750,000 sq foot of office space and an additional 10,000 square feet dedicated to retail. The second tower hosts two hotels, JW Marriott Marquis Miami and Hotel Beaux Arts, boasting 80,000 sq foot of meeting space, 313 guestrooms, 44 ultra luxury rooms, a fitness center, spa facilities, and four on-site food and beverage options. These towers are conjoined by a shared podium featuring 1,400 parking spaces. Noteworthy accolades for MET2 include LEED Gold certification and the 2012 Urban Land Institute Vision Award.

Met 3 is the second residential tower of the complex, a 32-story luxury rental property with 462 apartments and a 36,000 sq foot Whole Foods supermarket. Although the initial design asked for a much taller structure (76 floors) the final project opened completely reimagined opening in 2015 after multiple delays caused by the subprime mortgage crisis.

The final phase, Met Square was finally completed in 2018. Initially a lifestyle complex, the project evolved to include another residential tower, with 188 luxury apartments on top of a 16-screen 80,000 sq foot Silverspot Cinema. The delays and reconfiguration of the project happened after important archaeological ruins were found on the site. Several holes carved on the limestone align to form circles that could indicate a village structure. Radiocarbon tests placed ruins and artifacts from A.D. 650 to 1500 years. There was also a portion of Miami’s first hotel, built in 1897 by Henry Flagler, uncovered by the construction. In 2014, the Met Square site was being considered for a National Historic Landmark status, and possibly UNESCO designation given the importance of these findings. In a landmark mediation process between public and private entities, the developers worked with archaeologists and government officials to find a solution for the site. The building was redesigned to include indoor and outdoor observation areas for the public as well as a museum for the history of Miami. However, not all preservationists are happy with the outcome, as the Museum was never completed.

As Miami developers keep pushing for urban renewal on the Downtown and the River, other sites on the same area now face similar challenges.

== Gallery ==
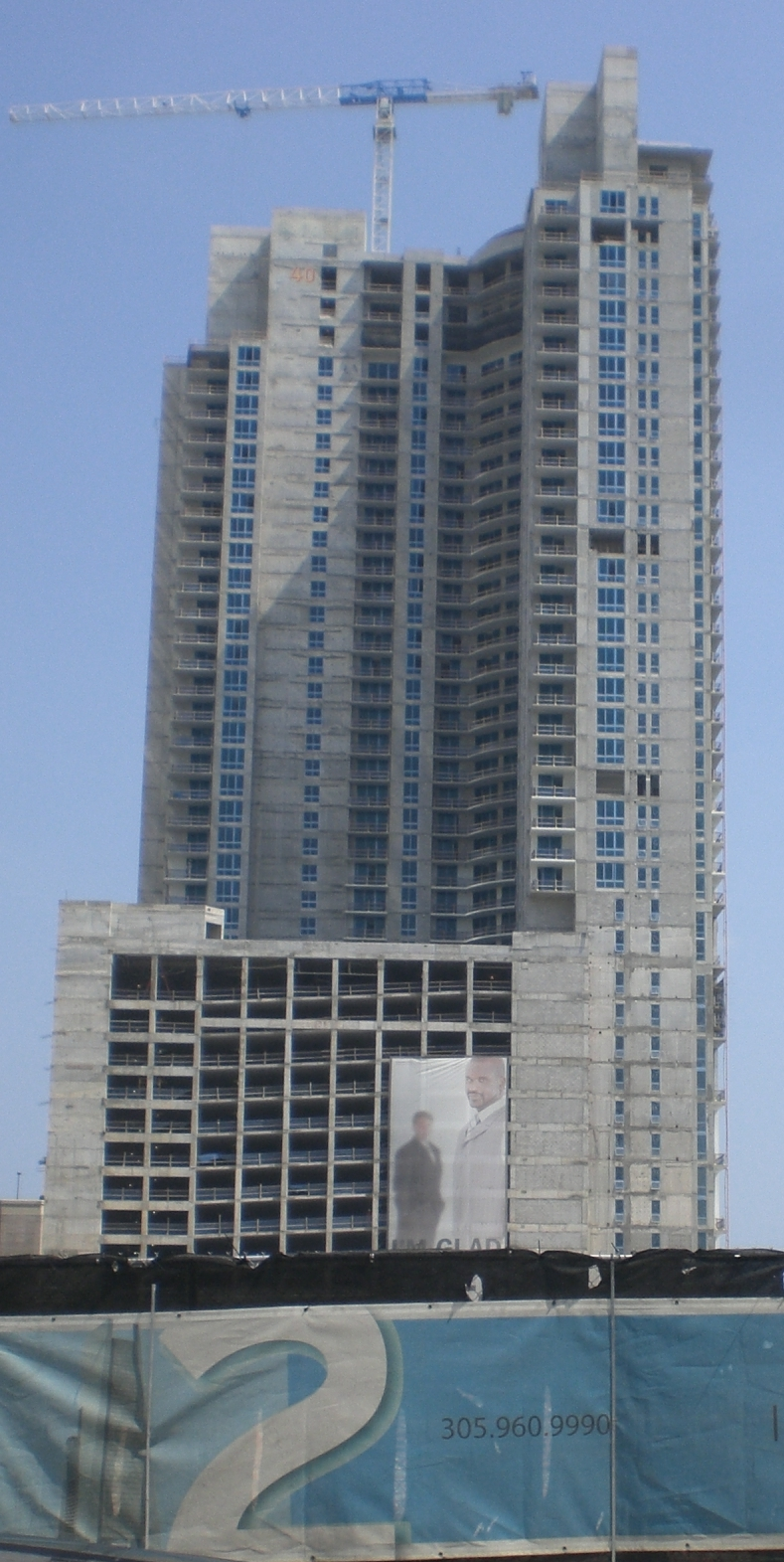
Met 1 under construction in March, 2007

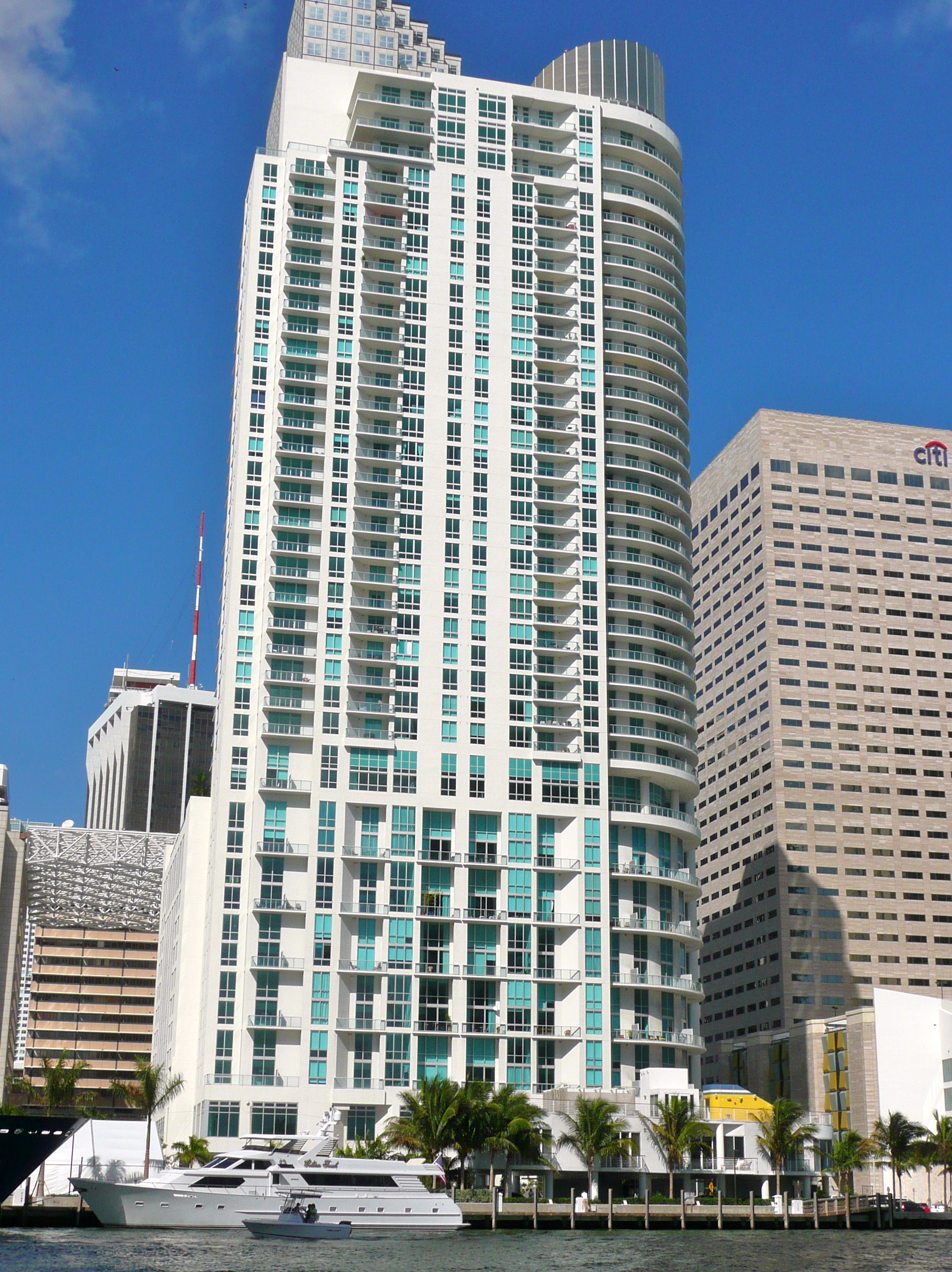
Met 1 seen across the Miami River

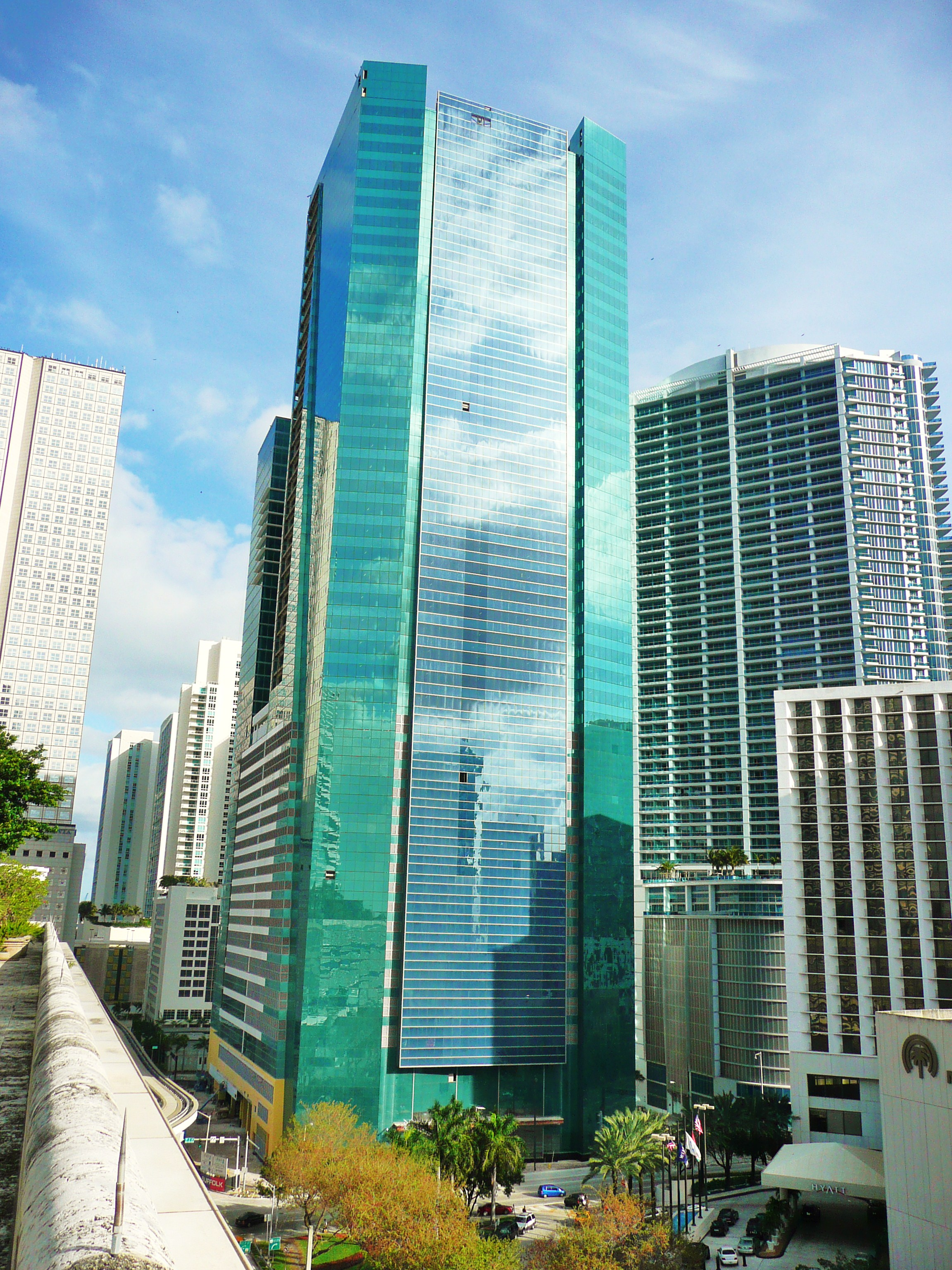
Met 2's Wells Fargo Center nearing completion

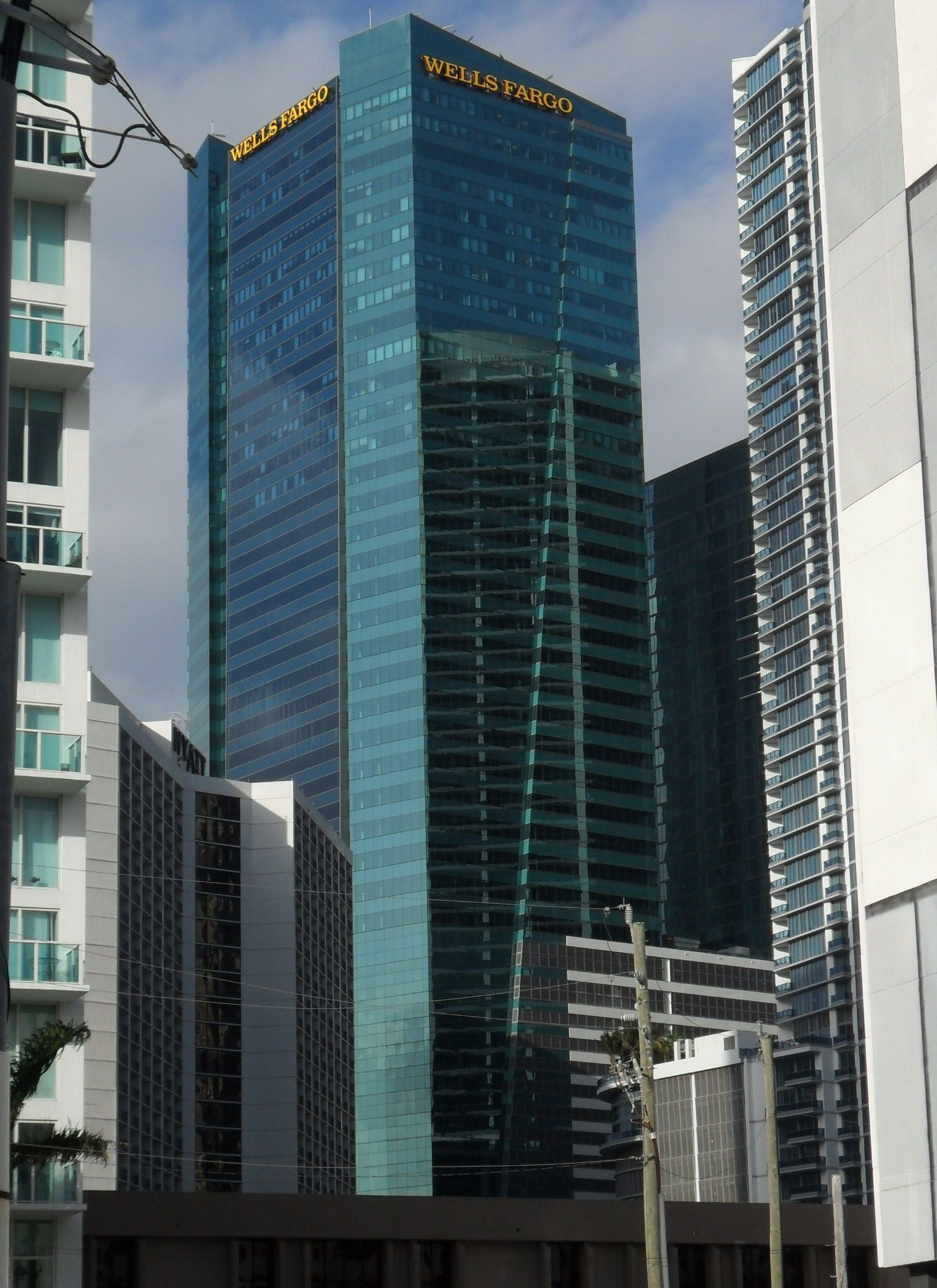
Completed Wells Fargo Center in 2011

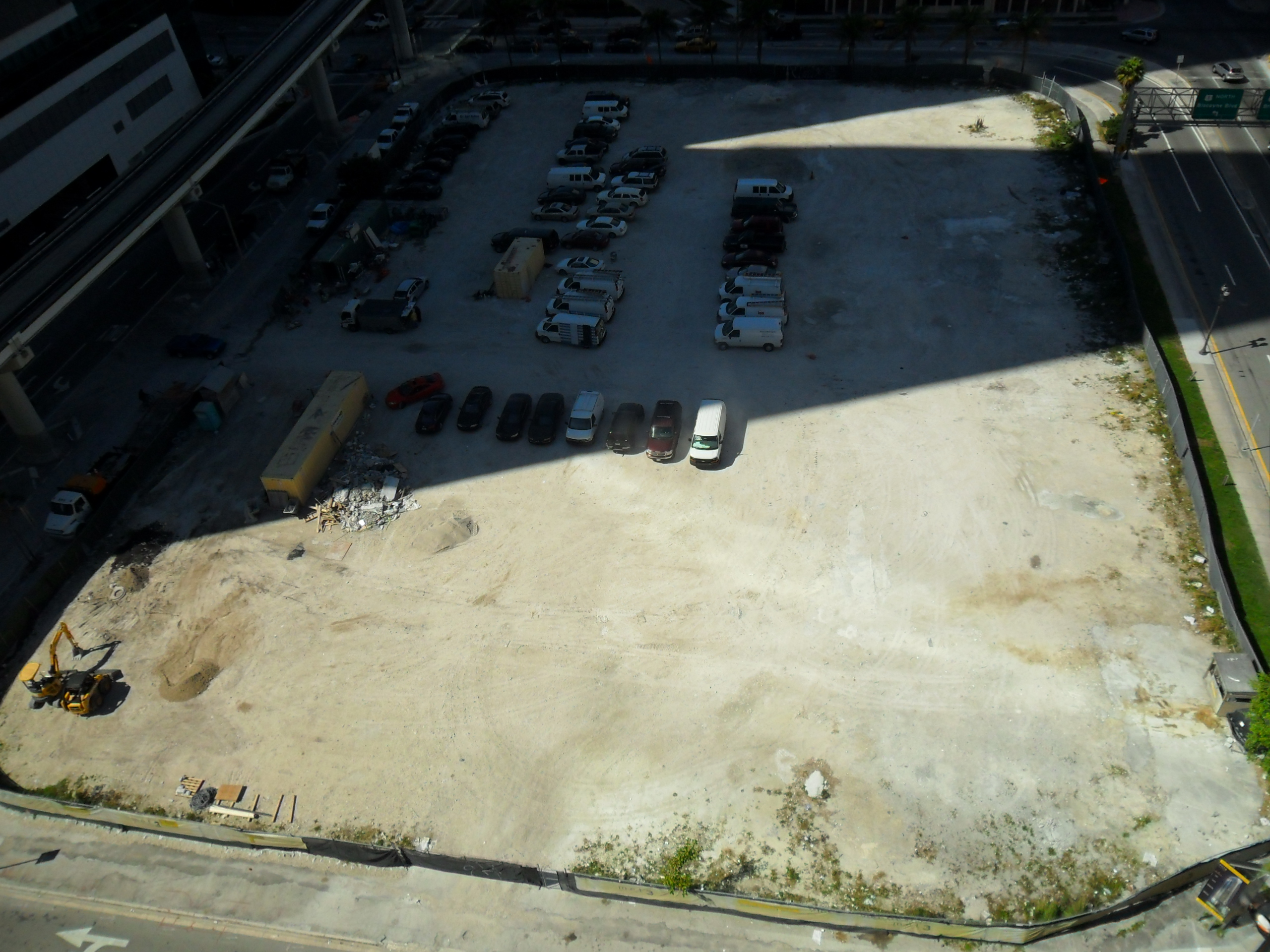
The site of Met 3 being used as a parking lot (February 2011)

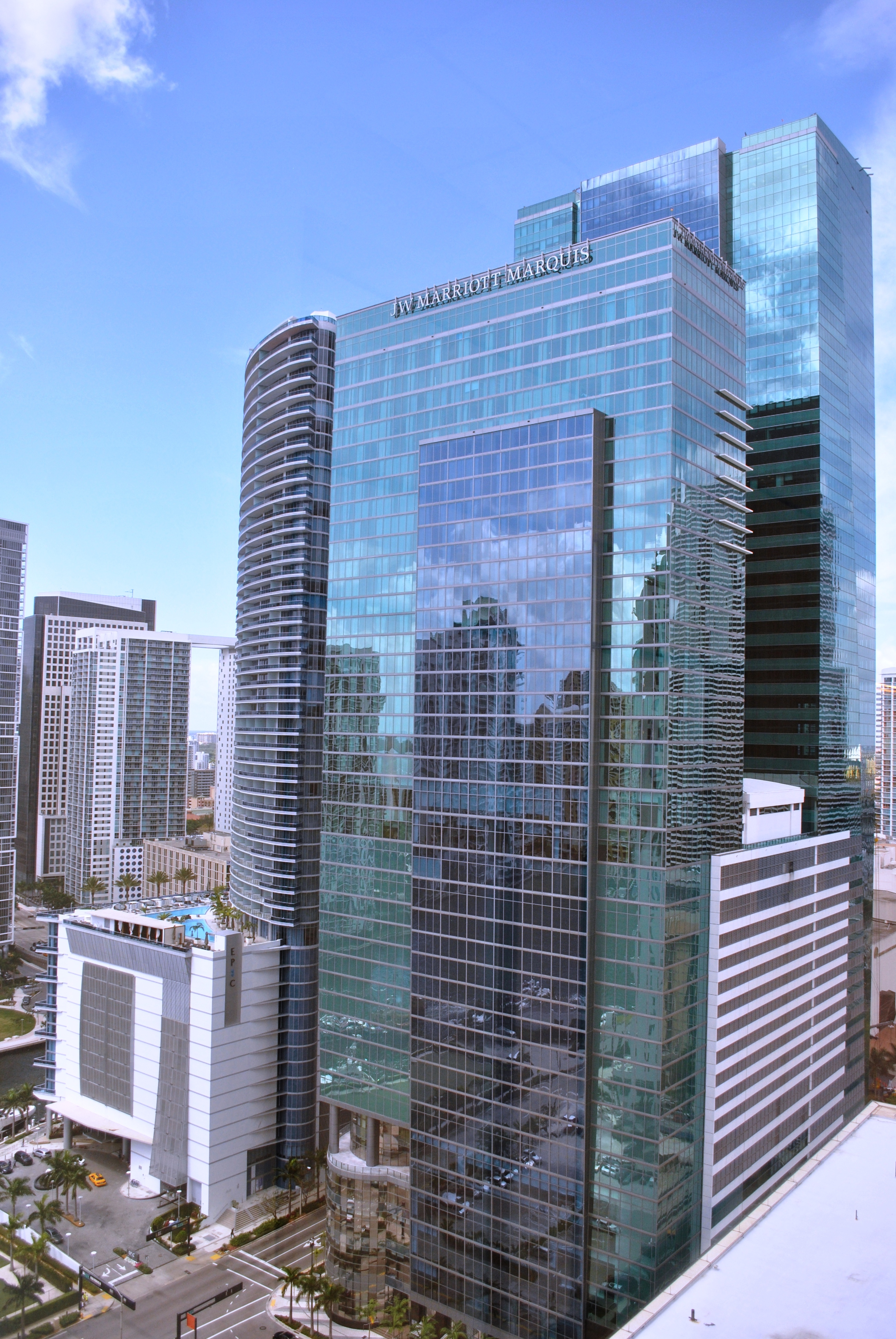
JW Marriott Marquis Miami

== See also ==
- Met 1
- JW Marriott Marquis Miami
- Wells Fargo Center (Miami)
- Met 3
- List of tallest buildings in Miami
