= Wells Fargo Center (Miami) =

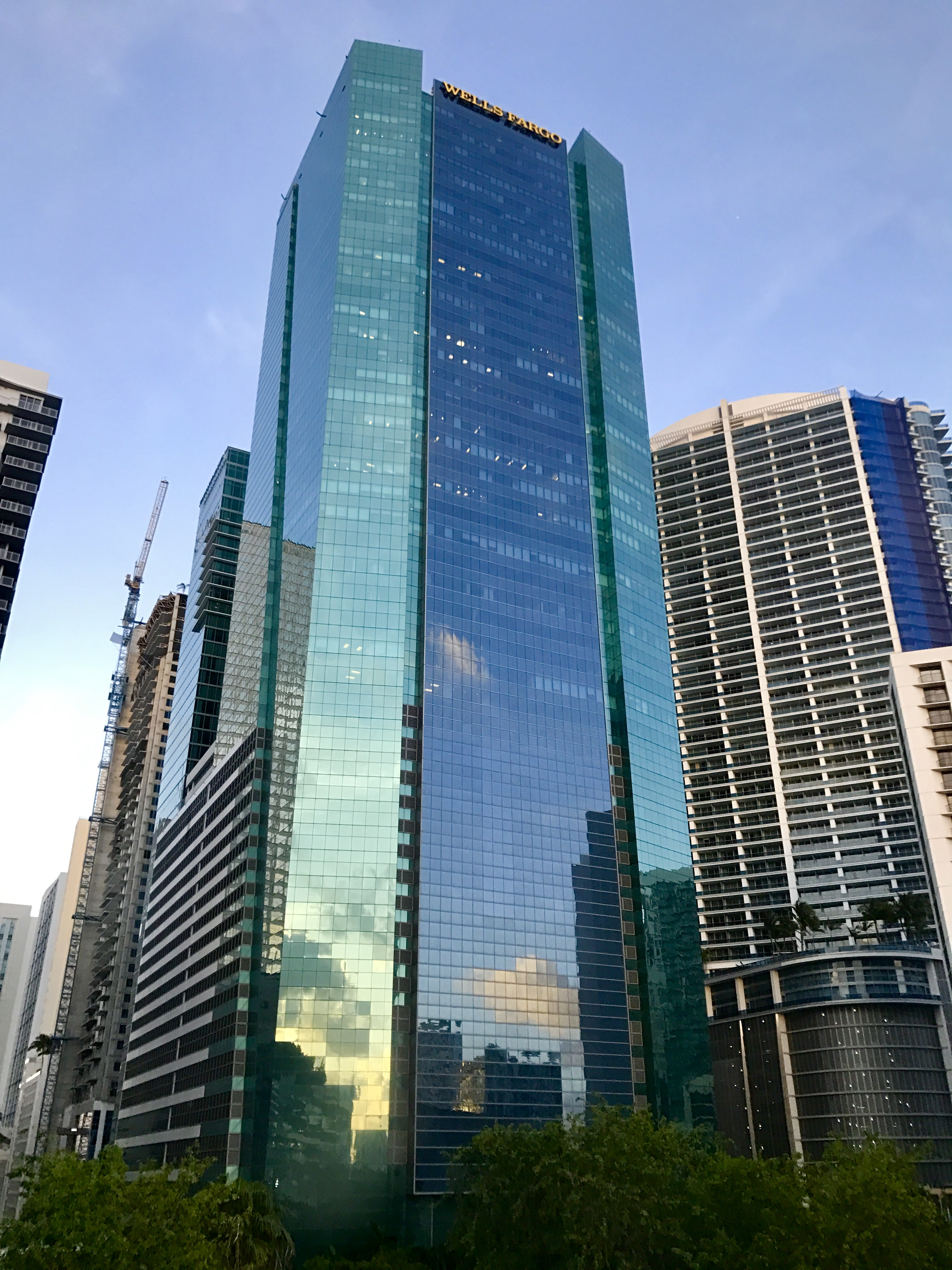
- Wells Fargo Center from the west

- Location within Florida
- Former names: Met 2 Financial Center

General information
- Status: Completed
- Type: Office
- Location: 333 Avenue of the Americas, Miami, Florida, United States
- Coordinates: 25.771364°N 80.188608°W
- Construction started: 2006
- Completed: 2009
- Opening: 2010

Height
- Roof: 647 ft (197 m)

Technical details
- Floor count: 47

Design and construction
- Architects: Nichols Brosch Wurst Wolf & Associates
- Developer: MDM Development Group
- Engineer: HNGS Engineers

The Wells Fargo Center (previously known as Met 2 Financial Center) is part of the Metropolitan Miami complex in the central business district of Downtown Miami, Florida. It was completed in 2010 and is one of the top twenty tallest buildings in Miami.

The Wells Fargo Center is a 47-story, 655 foot (200M) building that is adjacent to the JW Marriott Marquis Miami. The two structures are connected to each other via a parking garage.

The Metropolitan Miami project gained attention due to NBA star Shaquille O'Neal's involvement in the project. In 2006, he formed the O'Neal Group, a building-development company. The Metropolitan Miami project was the group's first project.

== Tenants ==
- Greenberg Traurig
- Silversea Cruises

== Gallery ==
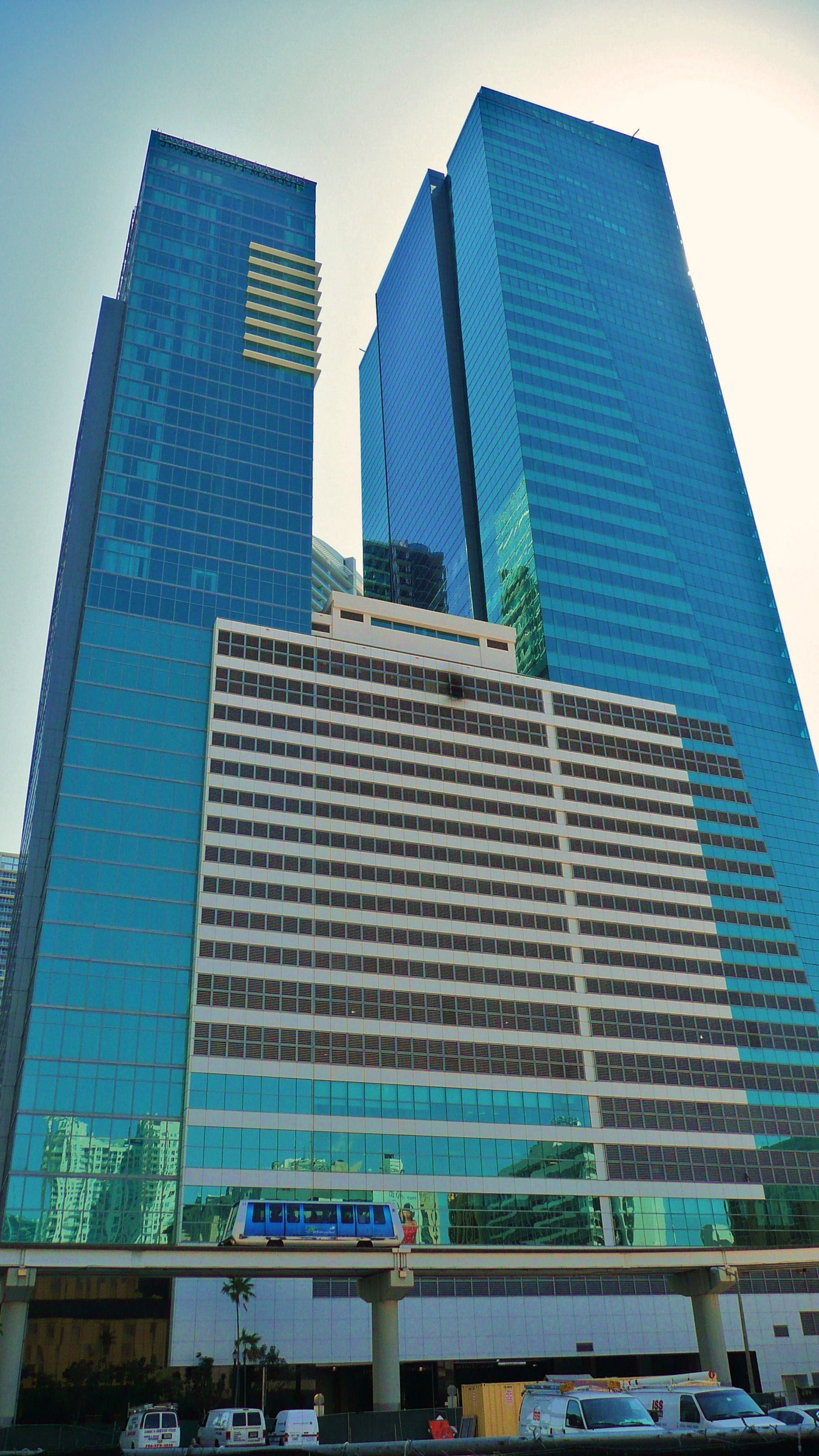
From the north; the JW Marriott Marquis Miami (left), and the Wells Fargo Center (right).

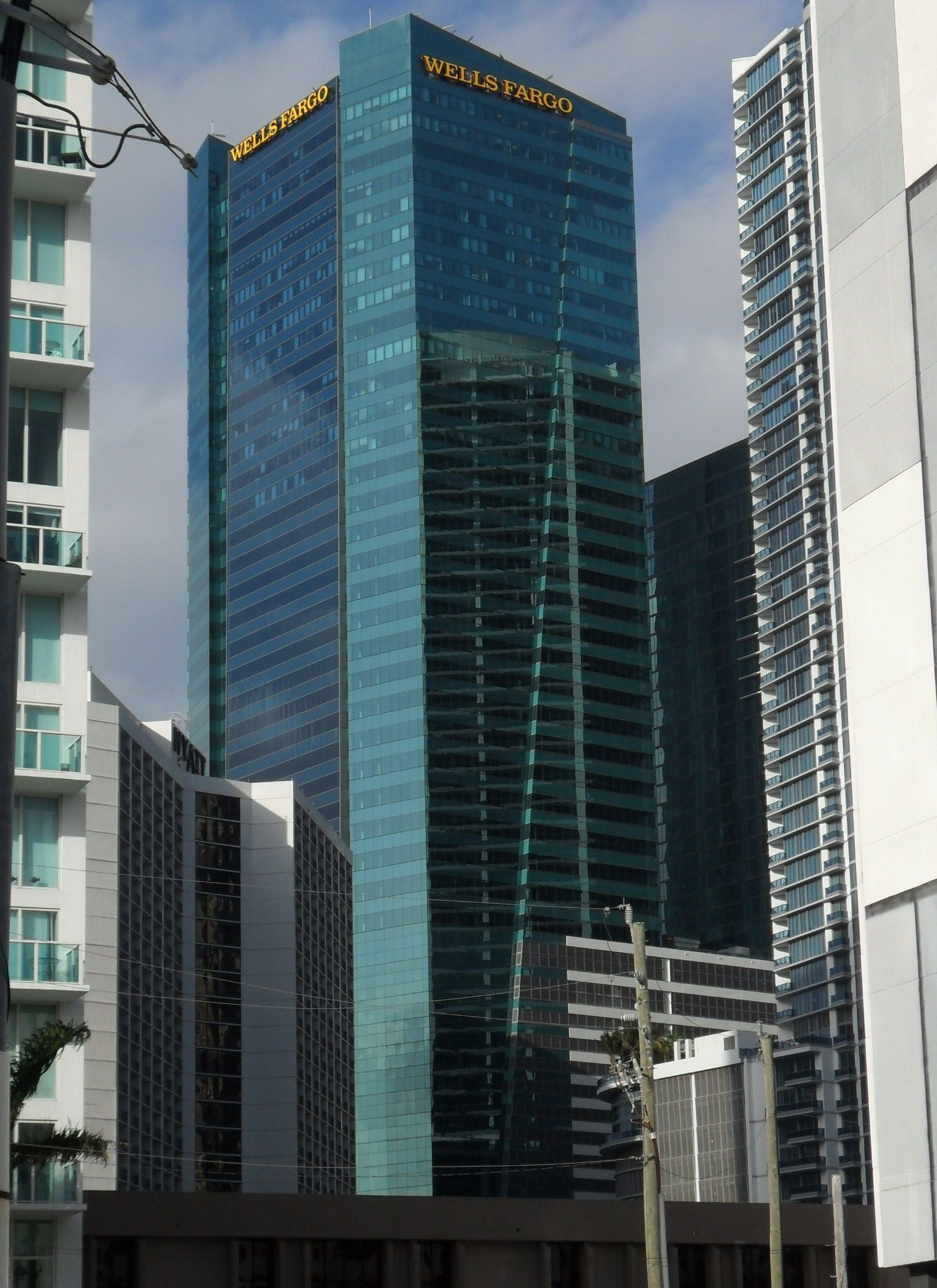
From the southwest

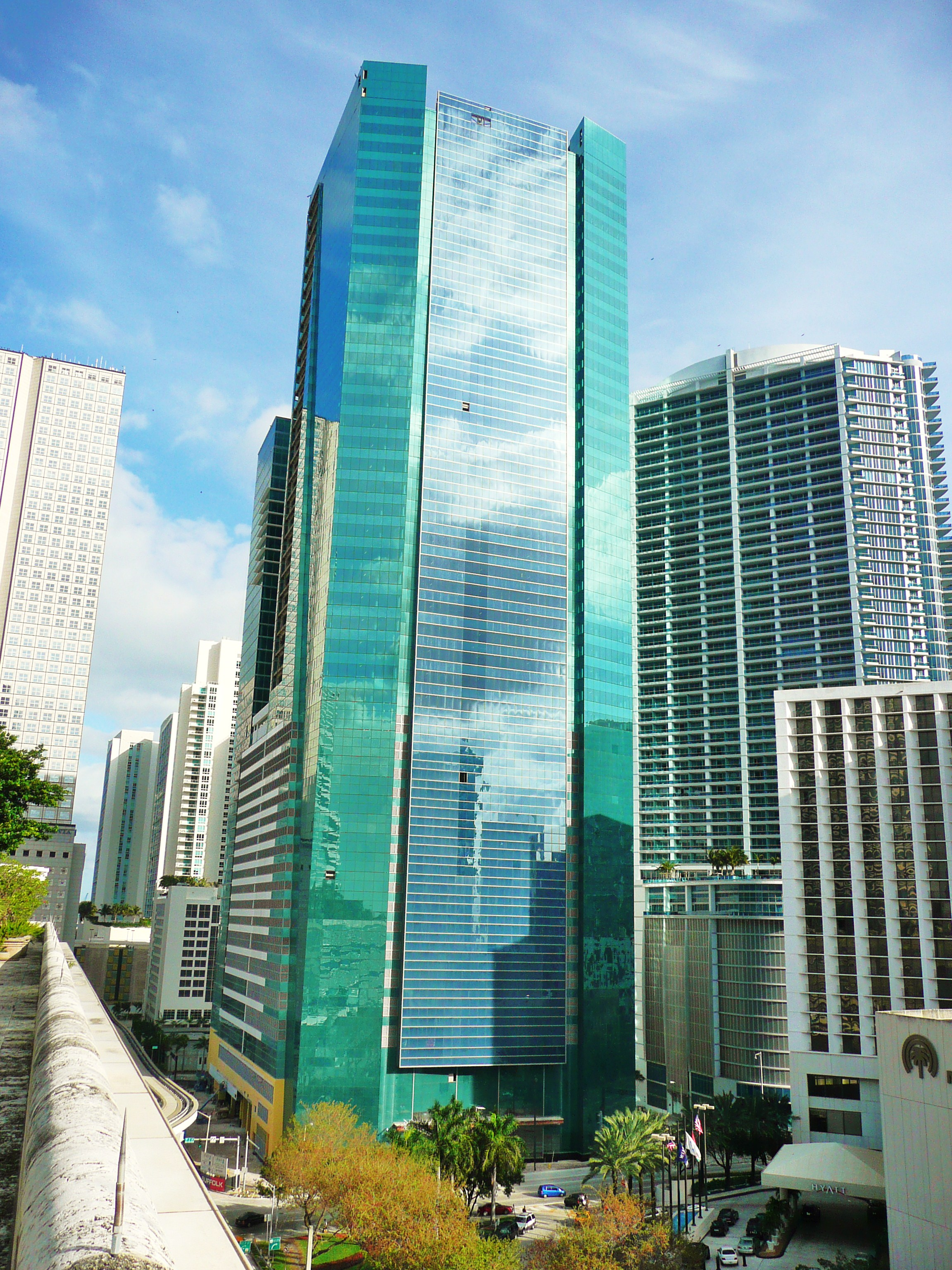
Met 2 from the west in January 2010 before the Wells Fargo signage was put on.

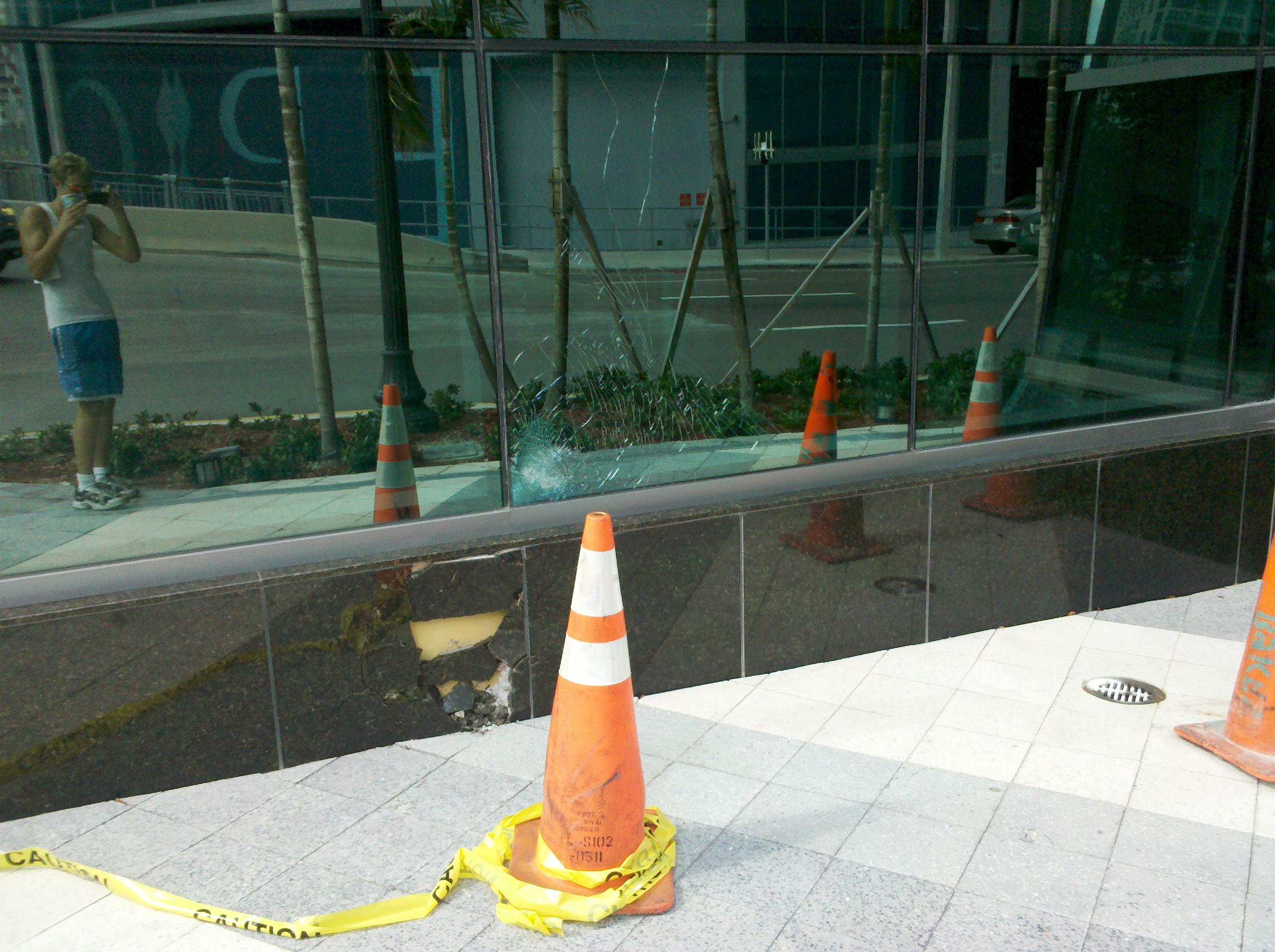
A broken window and facade panel on the Wells Fargo Center after a crash in 2011.

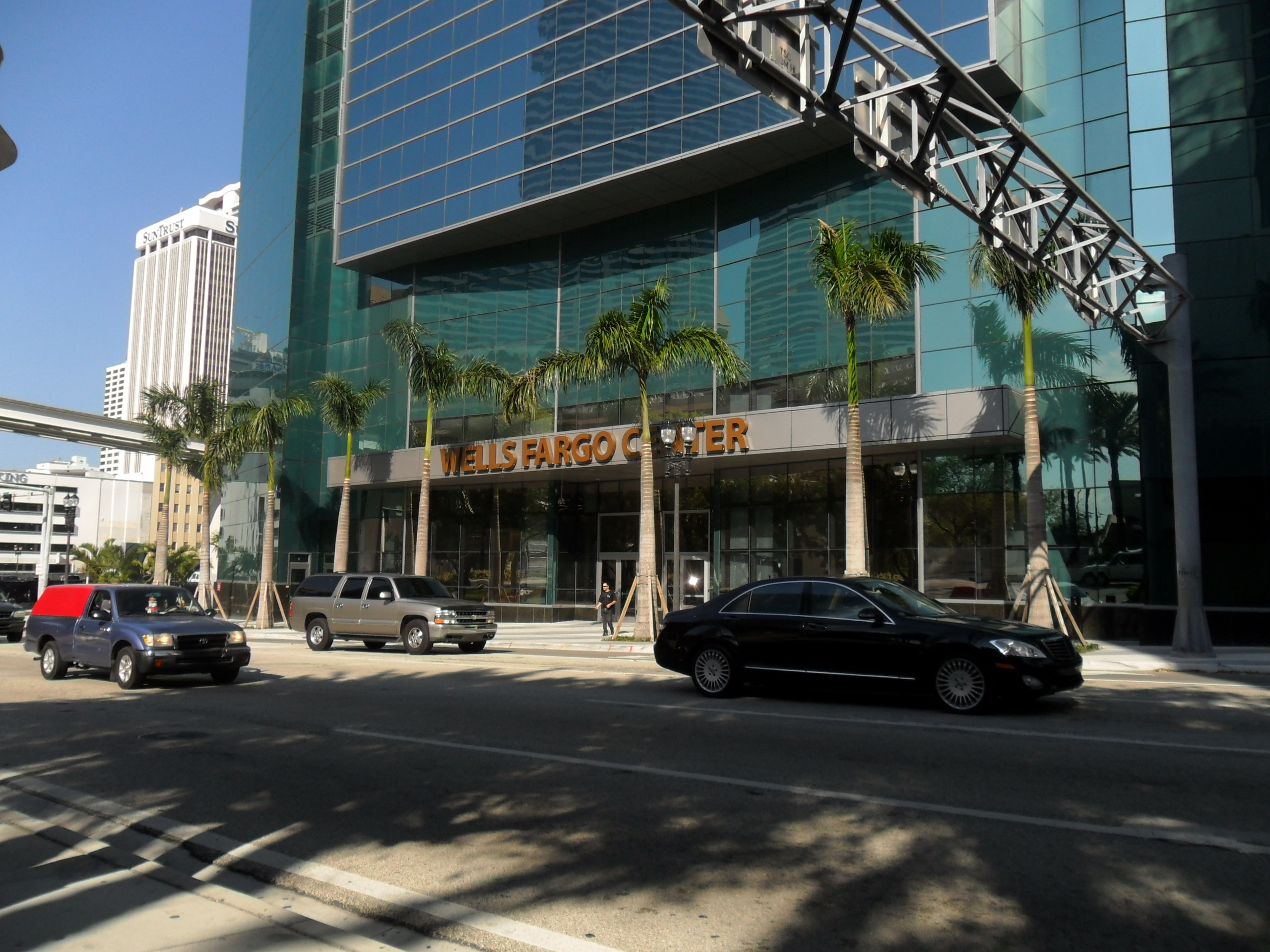
The main entrance to the Wells Fargo Center at 333 Avenue of the Americas.

== See also ==
- Metropolitan Miami (development)
- JW Marriott Marquis Miami
- Met 1
- Met 3
- List of tallest buildings in Florida
