= Wells Fargo Tower (Colorado Springs) =

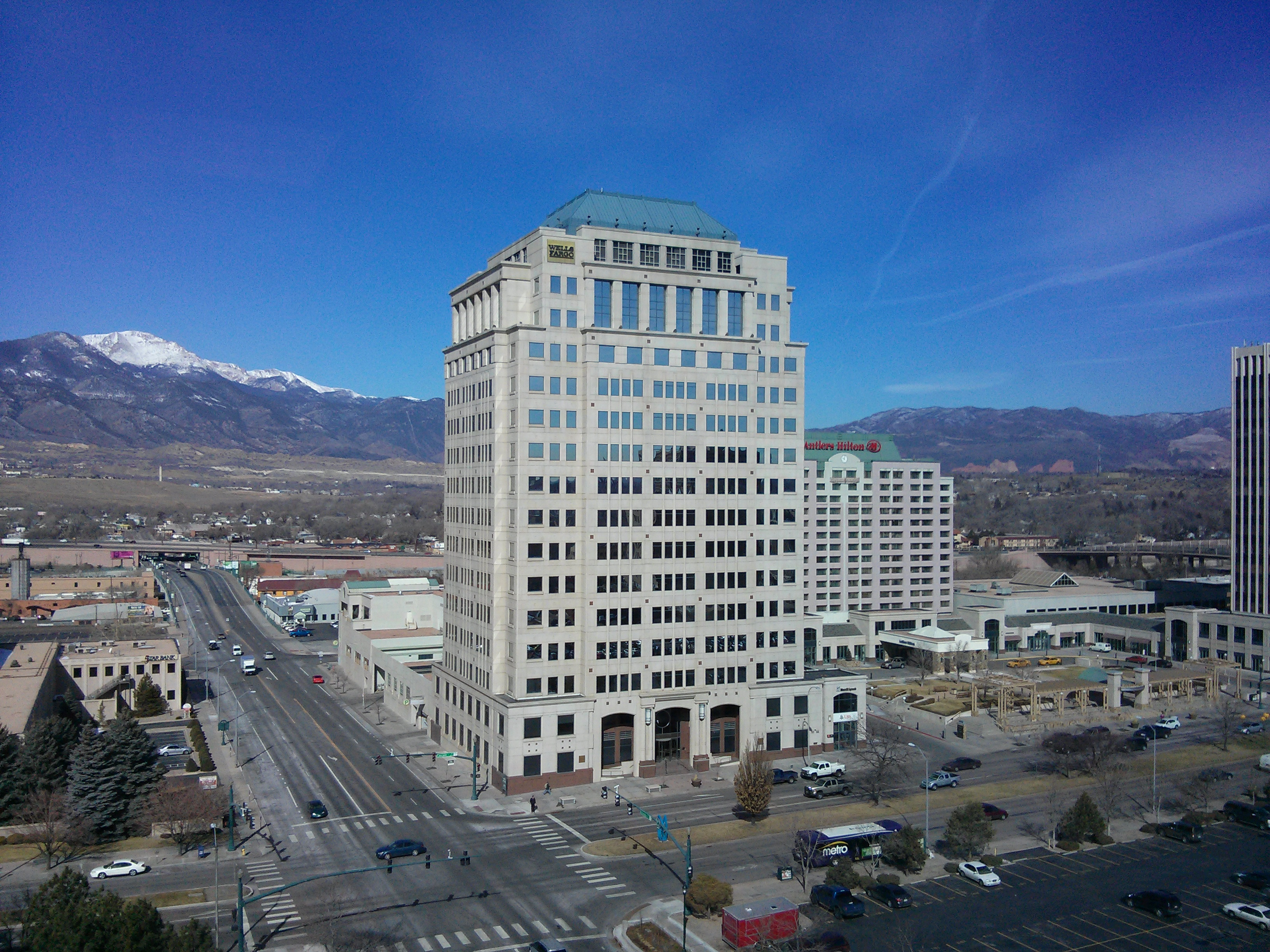
- Wells Fargo Tower
- Interactive map of the Wells Fargo Tower area

General information
- Status: Completed
- Type: Office
- Location: 90 S. Cascade Ave, Colorado Springs, Colorado, United States
- Coordinates: 38°49′59″N 104°49′33″W
- Opening: 1990

Height
- Roof: 247 ft (75 m)

Technical details
- Floor count: 16

Design and construction
- Architects: Kohn Pedersen Fox Associates PC, Klipp Colussy Jenks Dubois

Wells Fargo Tower, part of the Palmer Center complex, is the tallest building in Colorado Springs, Colorado. Its construction was completed in 1990 and is located at 90 South Cascade Avenue. Before June 2000, the building was known as the Norwest Bank Tower.
