= Paradise Center for the Arts =

Coordinates: 44°17′40″N 93°16′06″W

- Paradise Center for the Arts
- Interactive map of Paradise Center for the Arts
- Address: 321 Central Avenue; Faribault, Minnesota; USA
- Capacity: 915 (orig.), 300 (post reno.)
- Type: Atmospheric theatre
- Current use: live theatre, art gallery

Construction
- Opened: 1929
- Rebuilt: 2007
- Years active: 1929-1980s, 2007-present
- Architect: Liebenberg and Kaplan

Website
- www.paradisecenterforthearts.org

The Paradise Center for the Arts is a historic theater in Faribault, Minnesota which is part of the downtown historic preservation district. The Paradise Center for the Arts is located at 321 Central Avenue.

== History ==
The site of the Paradise Center for the Arts was first the Faribault Opera House, which opened in 1894. The opera house presented everything from Shakespeare, operas, lectures, and comedic plays. In 1908, the opera house was converted to a moving picture venue and was renamed the Grand Theater.

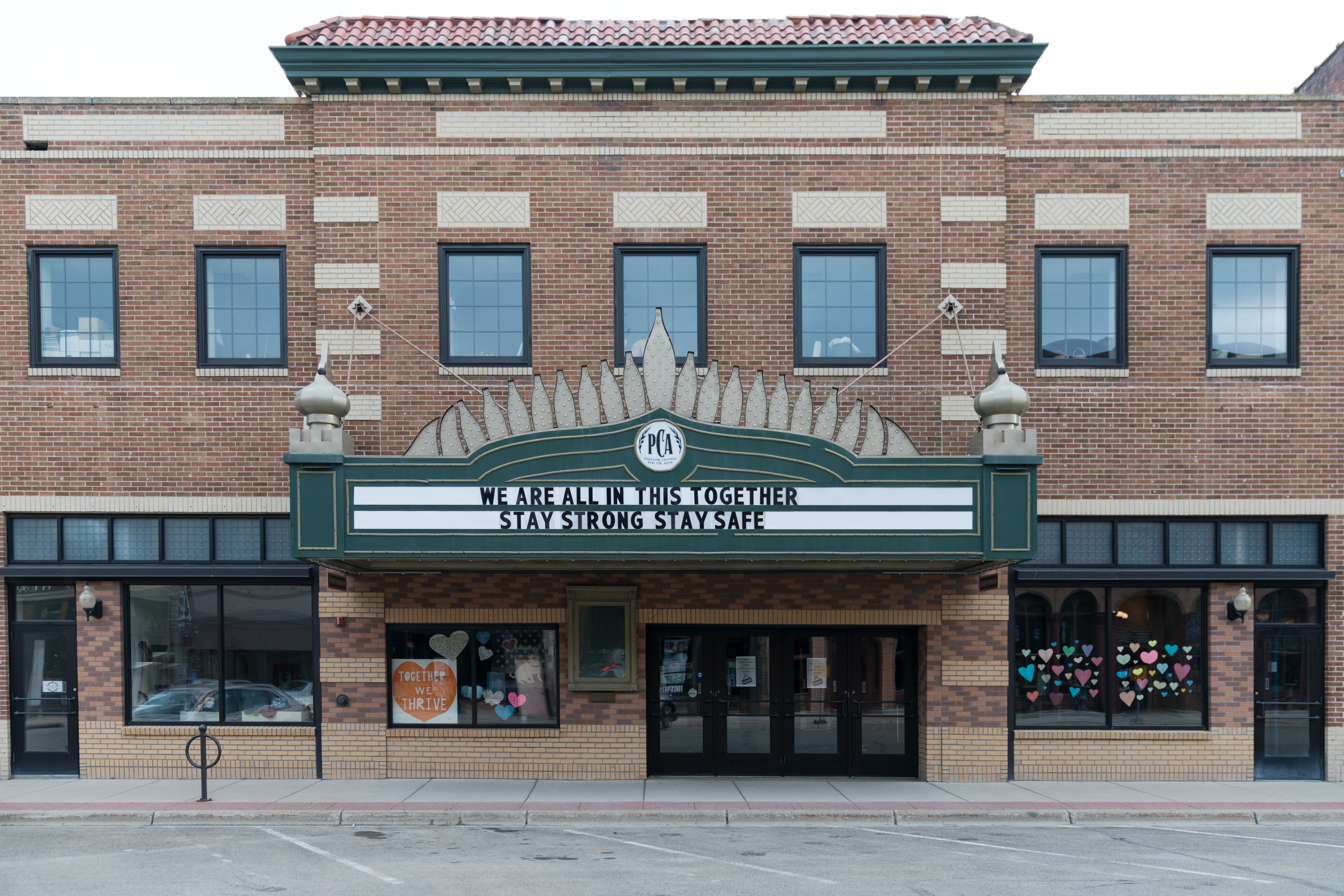
Paradise Center for the Arts during the COVID-19 pandemic.

In January 1929, on a cold night, the Grand burned. The owner, Will Glaser, announced plans to rebuild and "take advantage of the newest inventions of sound picture equipment" in order to show "talkies". The idea of the theater was to be "atmospheric" and offer an enhanced experience. It was designed by the firm of Liebenberg and Kaplan (who also designed the Uptown Theater and the Oak Street Cinema in Minneapolis). The motif is one of a Moorish courtyard with Turkish caps over the doors, turrets and "stonework" on the walls. The new building was called the Paramount Theatre.

For more than 60 years, this building, the Paradise Theater, served the region with a 915-seat atmospheric theatre, capable of producing arts programming on a fully functioning stage and showing newly released films. The theater closed in the late 1980s, under pressure from more modern, multiplex theaters that had sprung up in the region.

The Paradise was renovated. Originally built to seat 915, the Paradise has been altered to seat 300. The remainder of the building has become a multi-purpose art center with an exhibition gallery, classrooms, and retail space, with fully restored facades in the lobby. The Bahl Family Auditorium was restored (with the change in size) to its original 1929 splendor.

== Management ==
The period of vacancy at the Paradise Theater was not void of artistic enterprises. The Faribault Art Center (FAC) which became a nonprofit in 1965, Faribault Area Community Theater (FACT), founded in 1988, and The Merlin Players all became very active players in the regional arts scene. For over 40 years, the Faribault Art Center (now the Paradise Center for the Arts) has been part of the Faribault community. Begun in the 1950s by a small group of artists, FAC promoted visual arts to local artists and art lovers through classes, exhibitions, and community involvement projects. FACT also had a strong history of making theatrical performances accessible to community participants as well as patrons. There are currently four community theater performances a year.

The Merlin Players (TMP) is a non-profit theater organization that provides professional, affordable theatre experiences to audiences throughout southeastern Minnesota. These productions are designed to offer actors, technical staff and director's challenges for artistic growth. Dedicated to the ideology that artists are deserving of monetary reimbursement for their talents and efforts just like any other work, TMP provides stipends to everyone involved in productions, not just the actors, including students who provide backstage and technical support. This relationship provides students with experience working with professionals, which has led to strong mentoring relationships. TMP has a production schedule of four full shows a year at the Paradise starting with Always, Patsy Cline in May 2008. Their first show in the Paradise was in December 2007, a production of A Christmas Carol.
