= Riverview Theater =

Movie theater in Minneapolis, US

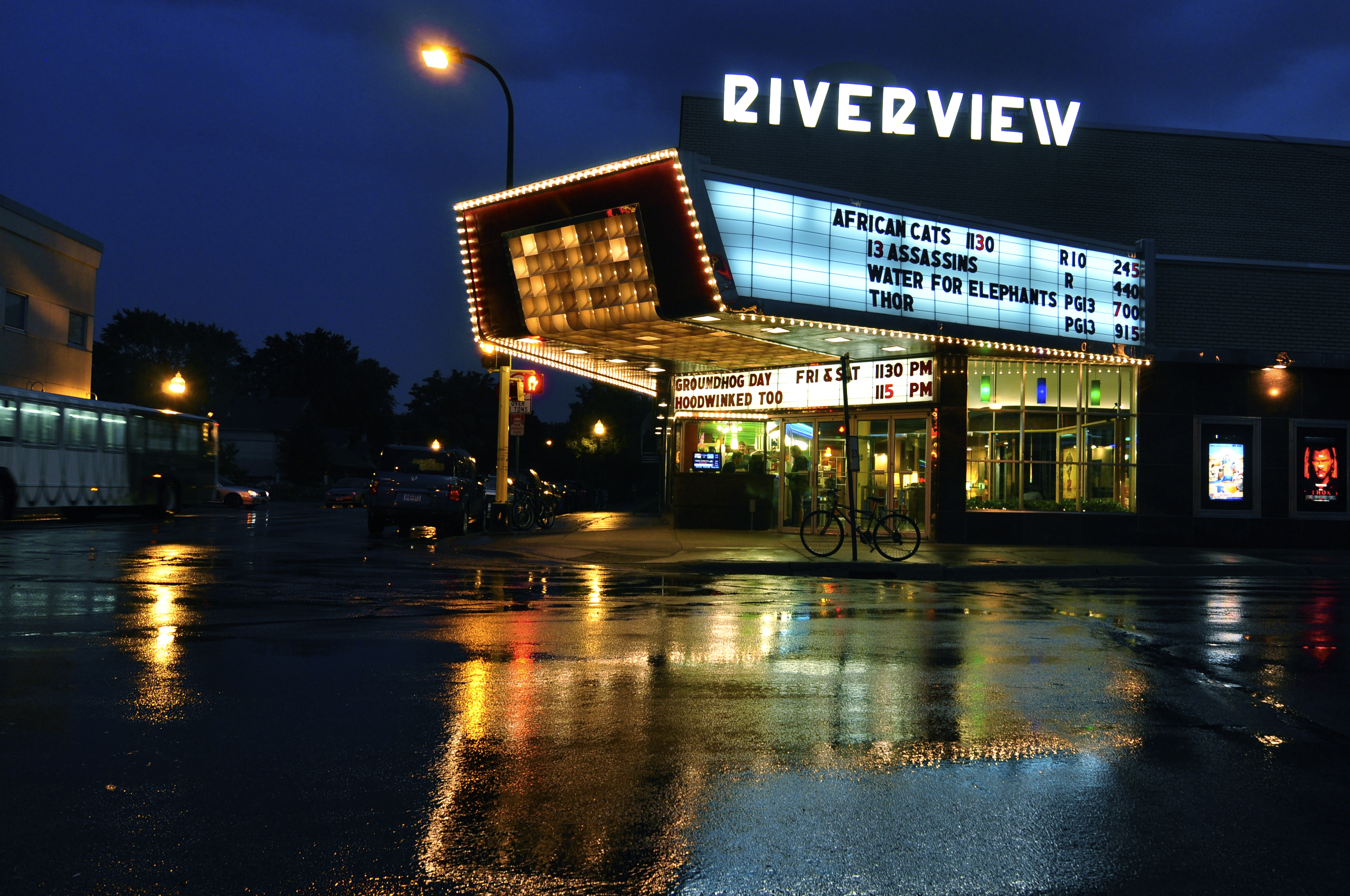
- The Riverview's lit marquee in 2011
- Interactive map of Riverview Theater
- Address: 3800 42nd Avenue South; Minneapolis, MN 55406
- Coordinates: 44.934051°N 93.21316°W
- Seating type: Stadium
- Capacity: >700
- Type: Indoor movie theater

Construction
- Built: 1948
- Opened: December 30, 1948
- Renovated: 1956
- Architect: Liebenberg and Kaplan

Website
- riverviewtheater.com

The Riverview Theater is a cinema in the Howe neighborhood of Minneapolis, Minnesota, United States. Designed by Liebenberg and Kaplan, the theater was built by theater owners Bill and Sidney Volk in 1948. After building a subsequent theater in a new ultramodern style, the Volks returned to the Riverview in 1956 and had its lobby area heavily renovated and updated. The Riverview remains one of several surviving single-screen cinemas in the Minneapolis–Saint Paul area and typically showed second-run films until the COVID-19 pandemic, when it switched to showing first-run movies. Since the early 2000s, it has been consistently recognized by City Pages as one of the best movie theaters in the area.

== History ==
The Lithuania-born Volk brothers, Bill and Sidney, came to Minnesota in the early 1920s and got involved in the movie business by purchasing neighborhood theaters during the Great Depression. In 1946, the Volks initiated what the publication Greater Amusements called a "theater-building orgy" when they received a permit from the Minneapolis City Council to build the first new theater in Minneapolis in twelve years in spite of the protests of other theater managers. The Riverview was designed by architectural firm Liebenberg and Kaplan and built in 1948 in the Streamline Moderne style. It opened December 30, 1948, with a showing of June Bride. The single-screen theater utilized stadium seating, making it one of the earlier movie theaters to do so.

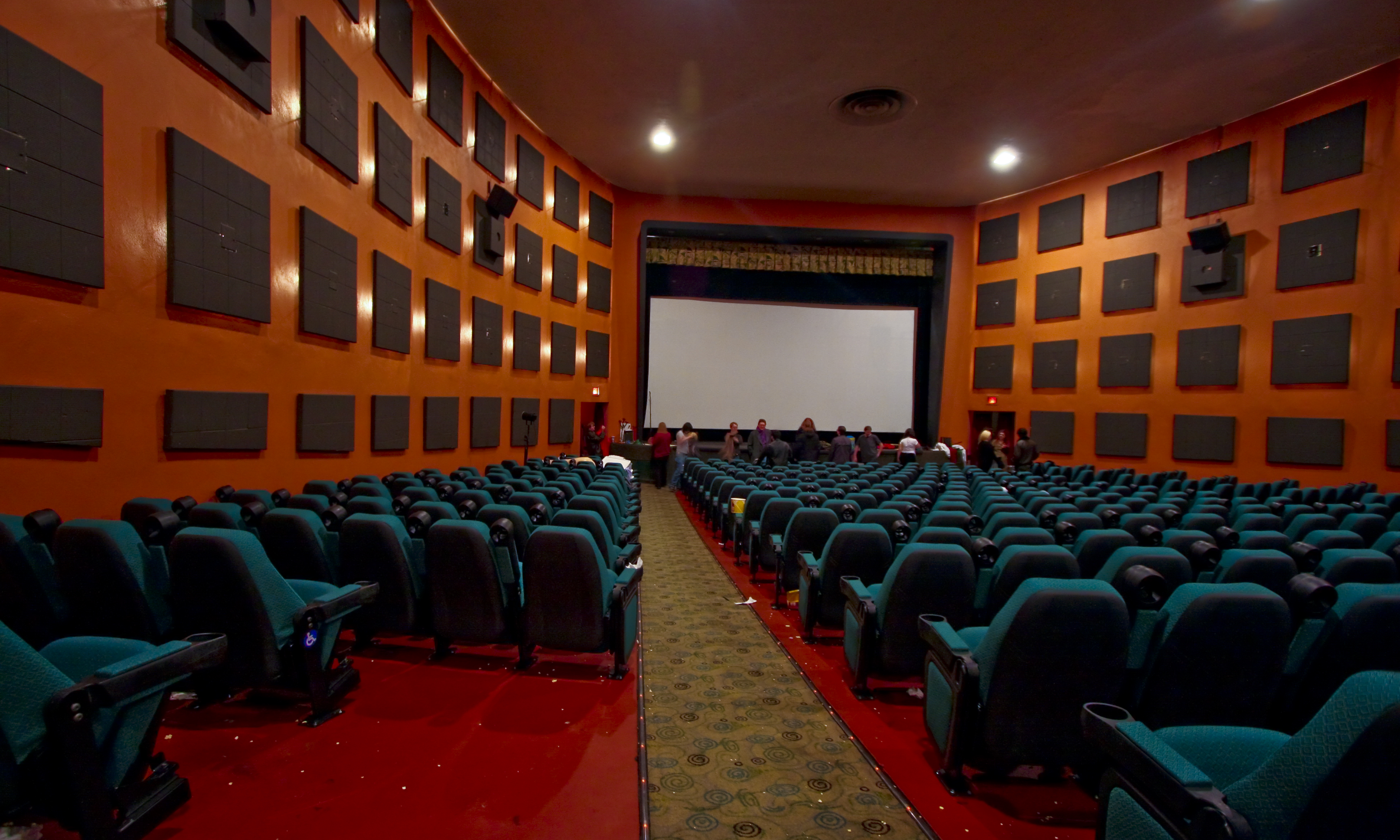
The interior of the Riverview's auditorium in 2008

Three years later, the Volks again called on Liebenberg and Kaplan to construct the Terrace Theater in Robbinsdale, Minnesota, "one of the first ultramodern theaters in America", and considered by author Larry Millett to be "their masterpiece". Pleased with the results (and the industry-bucking receipts), the Volks turned back to the Riverview and had Liebenberg and Kaplan remodel it to reflect the successful Terrace model. This occurred in 1956, eight years after the theater's initial construction. The new lobby space was intended to reflect a living room and even included a separate TV lounge. Amenities were ample: "Dunbar tables, McCobb stools, Herman Miller divans and chairs, walnut panels imposed on light wood, graceful modern lamps, stunning draperies." Inside the theater space, however, little changed about the proscenium stage and seating.

The Riverview became one of the few remaining single-screen theaters in the Minneapolis–Saint Paul area; by the end of the 1980s, it was one of only six left, and after 1998, it was one of only four left, with the Uptown and Parkway Theaters and the Oak Street Cinema, (Note: The Oak Street Cinema was demolished in 2011.) although since 1998, several new single-screen theaters–the Trylon Cinema and the Heights Theater–have opened. The owners installed new seats in 1999 that allowed for greater leg room and more space between patrons.

== Contemporary status ==
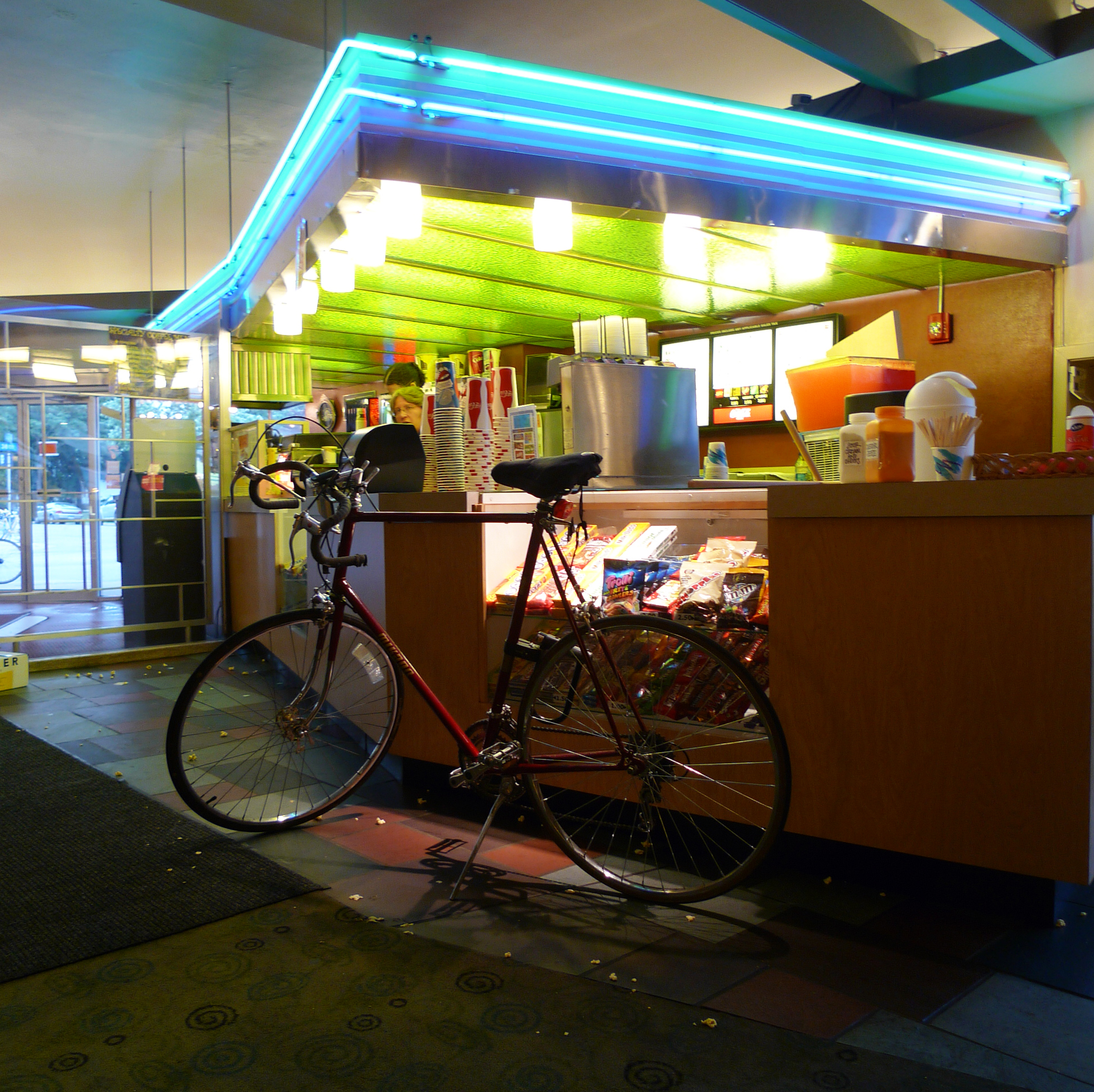
The Riverview's lobby, largely unchanged since 1956

The Riverview is located in Minneapolis's Howe neighborhood and seats 700 patrons. Prior to the COVID-19 pandemic, the theater typically played second-run films for between $2–3 per ticket and its concessions were also "much cheaper than at the suburban multiplexes". Upon reopening after the start of the pandemic, the theater shifted its model to playing first-run films.

Sometimes, other events are shown, including midnight movies, sporting events, film festivals, an annual screening of the Lord of the Rings trilogy, and political events such as Barack Obama's first inauguration in 2009. Take Up Productions, operator of the nearby 100-seat Trylon Cinema, sometimes uses the Riverview for screenings too large for the Trylon to accommodate. The theater won City Pages' Best Budget Movie Theater award in 2000, 2004, and 2005, and the Best Movie Theater award every year from 2006 to 2014 except 2011 and 2012. The Riverview's lobby remains largely unchanged from its 1956 renovation.
