= Trilon (disambiguation) =

Trilon may refer to:

- trilons, display devices often used on game shows
- Trilon, a trademark of BASF for various chelating agents derived from EDTA.
- ABS Trilon, a durable acrylonitrile butadiene styrene elastomer used in packaging and building materials
- Trilon-83, a codename for the nerve agent tabun.
- Trilon, the publisher of xv (software)
- Trilon Financial Corp., a Toronto-based financial services provider now part of Brascan Corporation.
- Trilon Inc., maker of ShotSpotter, a gunfire locator.
- Trilon Records, a jazz and blues label of the 1930s and 1940s.
- The Trylon and Perisphere, two geometric temporary structures at the 1939 New York World's Fair.
- Trylon Cinema, a movie theater in Minneapolis.
- Trylon, a company that manufactured triangular cross section radio masts and towers, now part of Trylon TSF.
