= Hollywood Theater (Minneapolis) =

- U.S. National Register of Historic Places
- Minneapolis Landmark
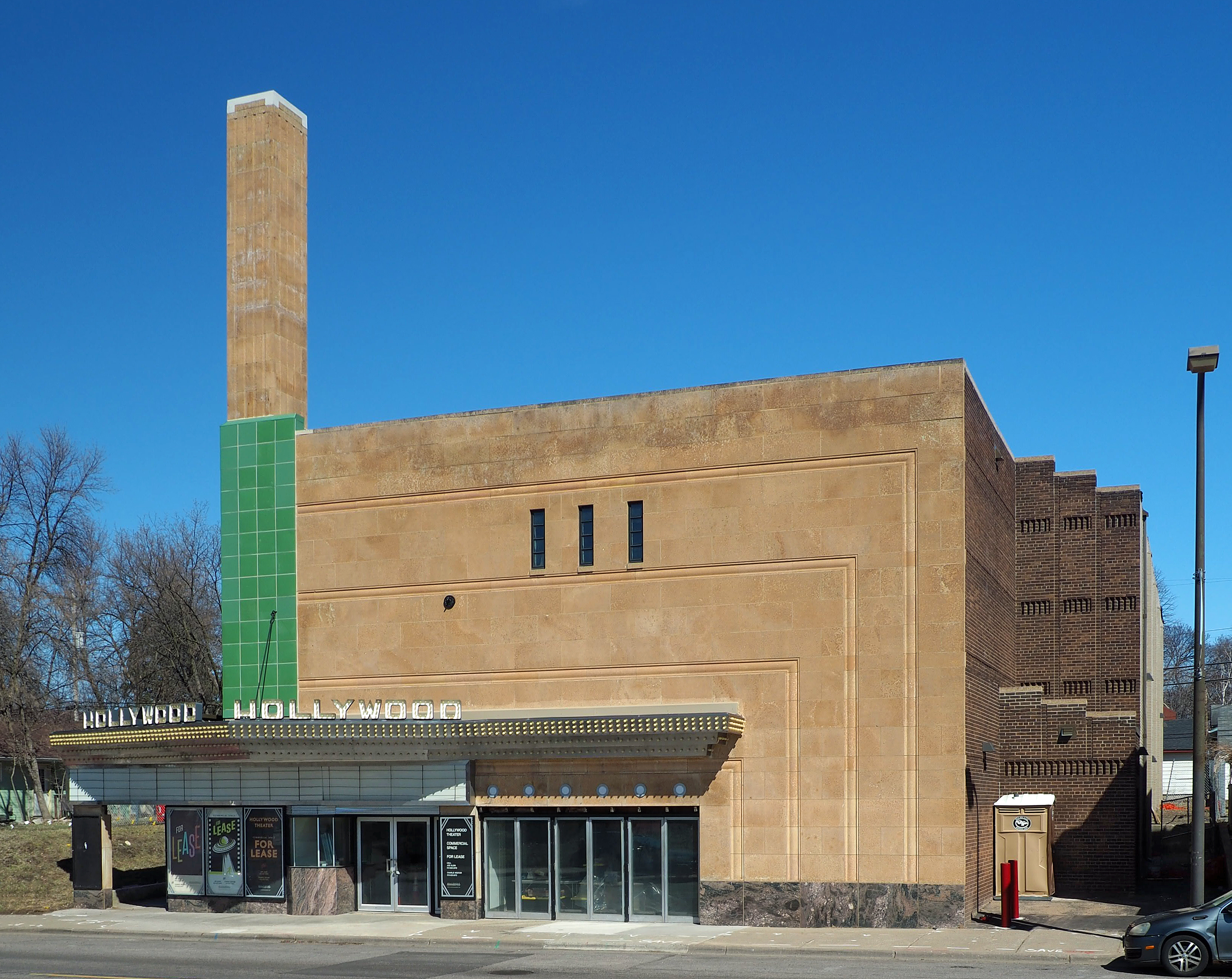
- The Hollywood Theater building from the southwest

- Location within Minnesota Location within the United States
- Location: 2815 Johnson Street Northeast, Minneapolis, Minnesota
- Coordinates: 45°01′09″N 93°14′13″W
- Area: less than one acre
- Built: 1935
- Architect: Jack Liebenberg and Seeman Kaplan
- Architectural style: Streamline Moderne
- Website: hollywoodmpls.com
- NRHP reference No.: 13001145

Significant dates
- Added to NRHP: February 5, 2014
- Designated MPLSL: 1990

The Hollywood Theater is a historic theater building in Minneapolis which is listed on the U.S. National Register of Historic Places. It is located in the Audubon Park neighborhood of Minneapolis.

The Art Deco theater building opened on October 26, 1935, and the marquee proclaimed it the "Incomparable Showcase of the Northwest". The theater, designed by architects Jack Liebenberg and Seeman Kaplan, had a generous budget that allowed for elaborate decoration in the Streamline Deco style of design; its facade and structure made a "powerful statement of geometric mass punctuated by the entrance, exits, and three small windows that served the projection booth." Liebenberg and Kaplan went on to design the Riverview Theatre in Minneapolis and the Terrace Theatre in Robbinsdale. The building featured a tall vertical sign, a patterned terrazzo floor, gilded pillars, and acoustical tiles in geometric patterns. It had a seating capacity of just under 1000. Much of the interior features are influenced by the Zig-Zag Moderne and Streamline Moderne styles. The exterior is built of smooth Kasota limestone with vertical lines that transition to horizontal.

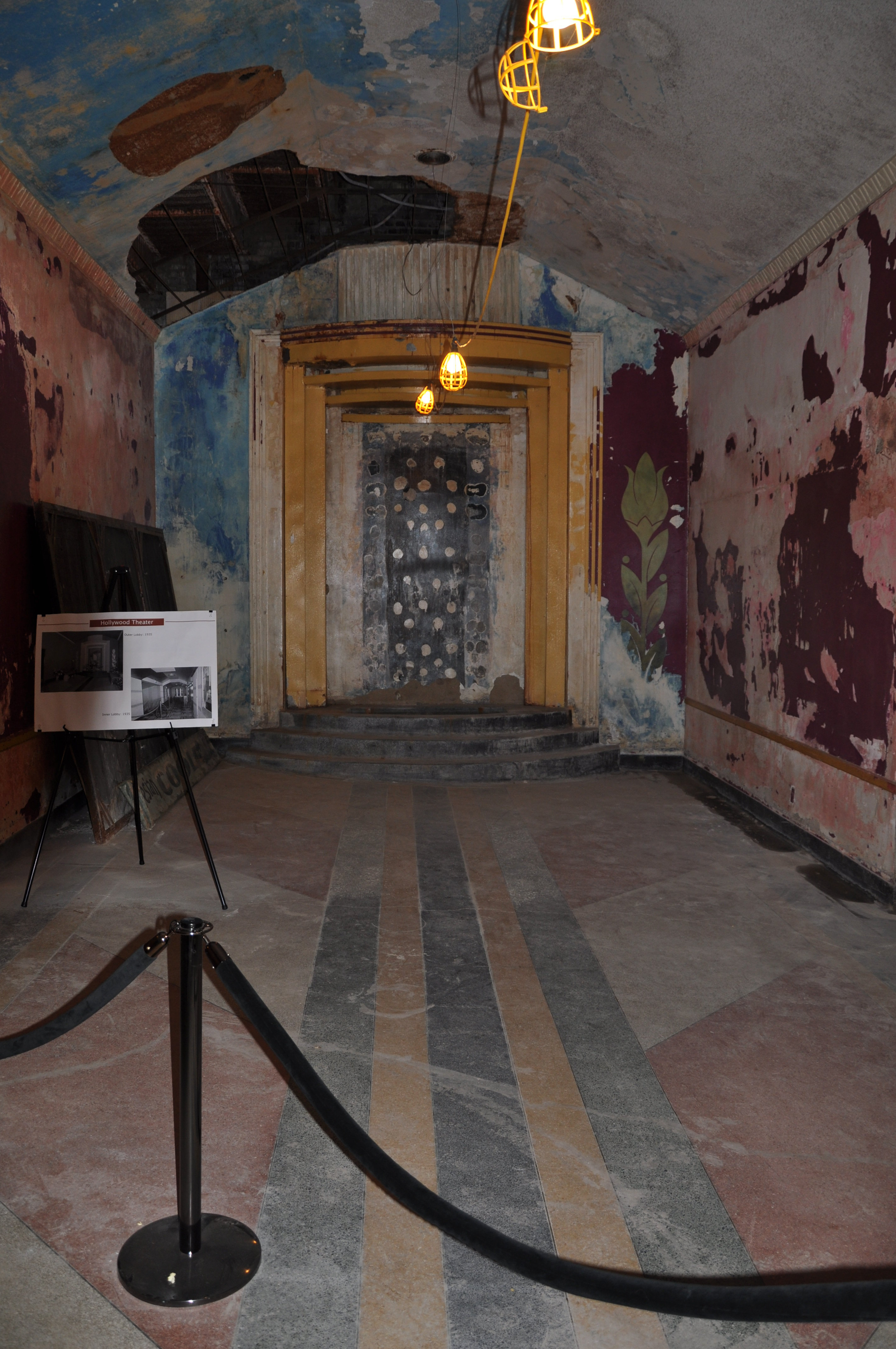
The theater's lobby area in May 2010

Although the theater was praised as "the Twin Cities' most beautiful and modern neighborhood theatre" and the "incomparable showplace of the Northwest", it was not financially successful. It went through a series of ownership changes until it closed in 1987.

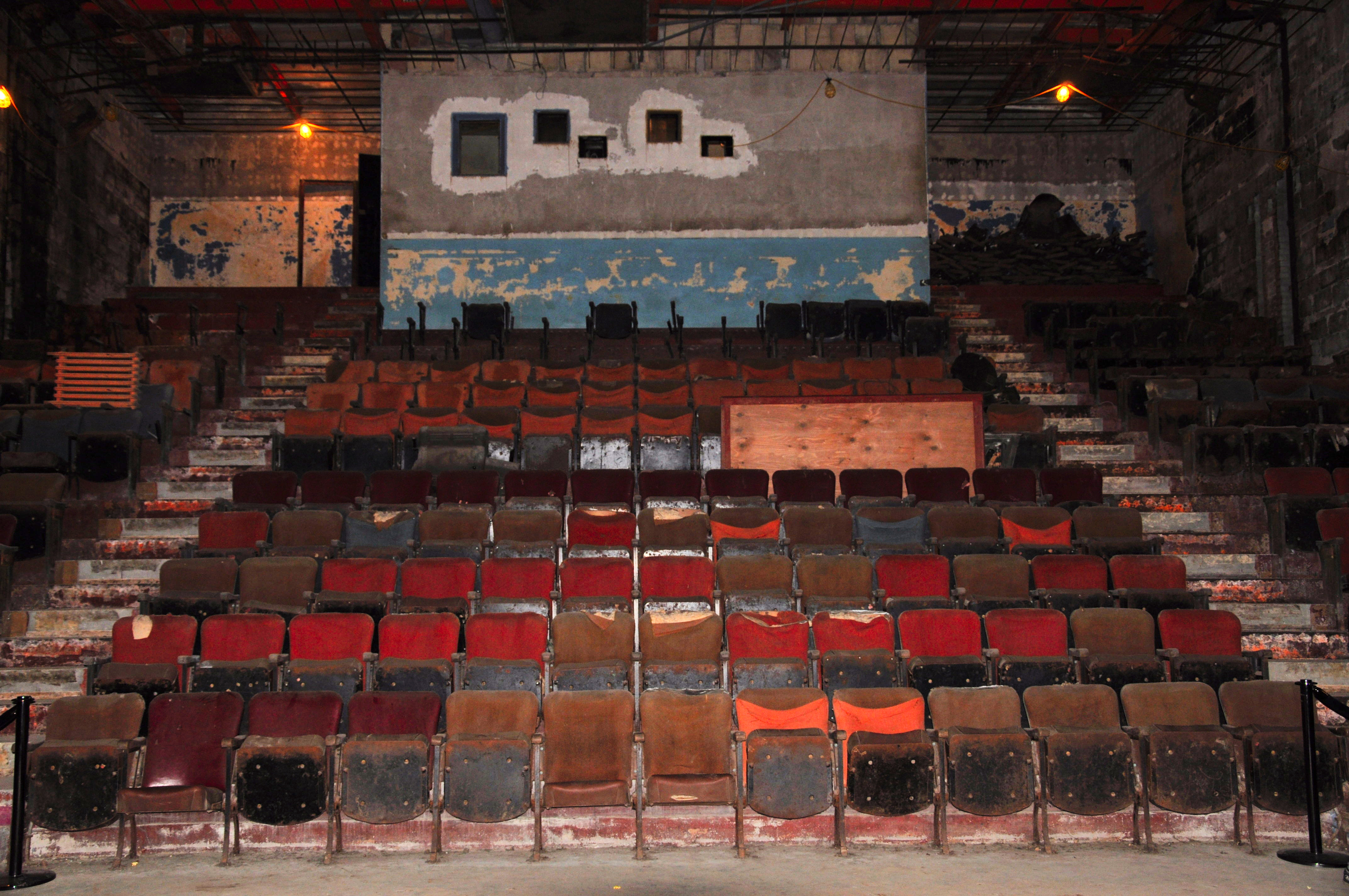
Interior of Hollywood Theater in 2010

The theater was designated as a local landmark by the Minneapolis Heritage Preservation Commission in 1990. It was unable to compete with video stores and multiplexes. Despite the historic designation, a number of development proposals for the property have fizzled since its closing. A 1989 proposal hinted at converting the theater into fourteen apartments, and another proposal in 1989 included converting the building to a photograph and film production studio. The Minneapolis Community Development Agency bought the theater in 1993. In 1998, they considered proposals for reuse, such as a full restoration, a partial rehabilitation such as the lobby area, or completely demolishing the theater. At the time, concerns included deterioration of the brick walls and water in the basement. In 2009, the city bought an adjacent property and cleared it to provide extra space for parking or related development. In 2015, the property was sold to Minneapolis real estate developer and entrepreneur Andrew Volna with plans to renovate it into an event venue while retaining the building's historic character. Renovation of the theater was completed in early 2023 and reopened shortly afterwards.

The Hollywood Theater was listed on the National Register of Historic Places on February 5, 2014. It was considered notable for its Streamline Moderne design by prominent theater architects Liebenberg & Kaplan and its association with the growth of locally owned, streetcar-accessible neighborhood cinemas during the Great Depression.
