= Ely State Theater =

- U.S. National Register of Historic Places
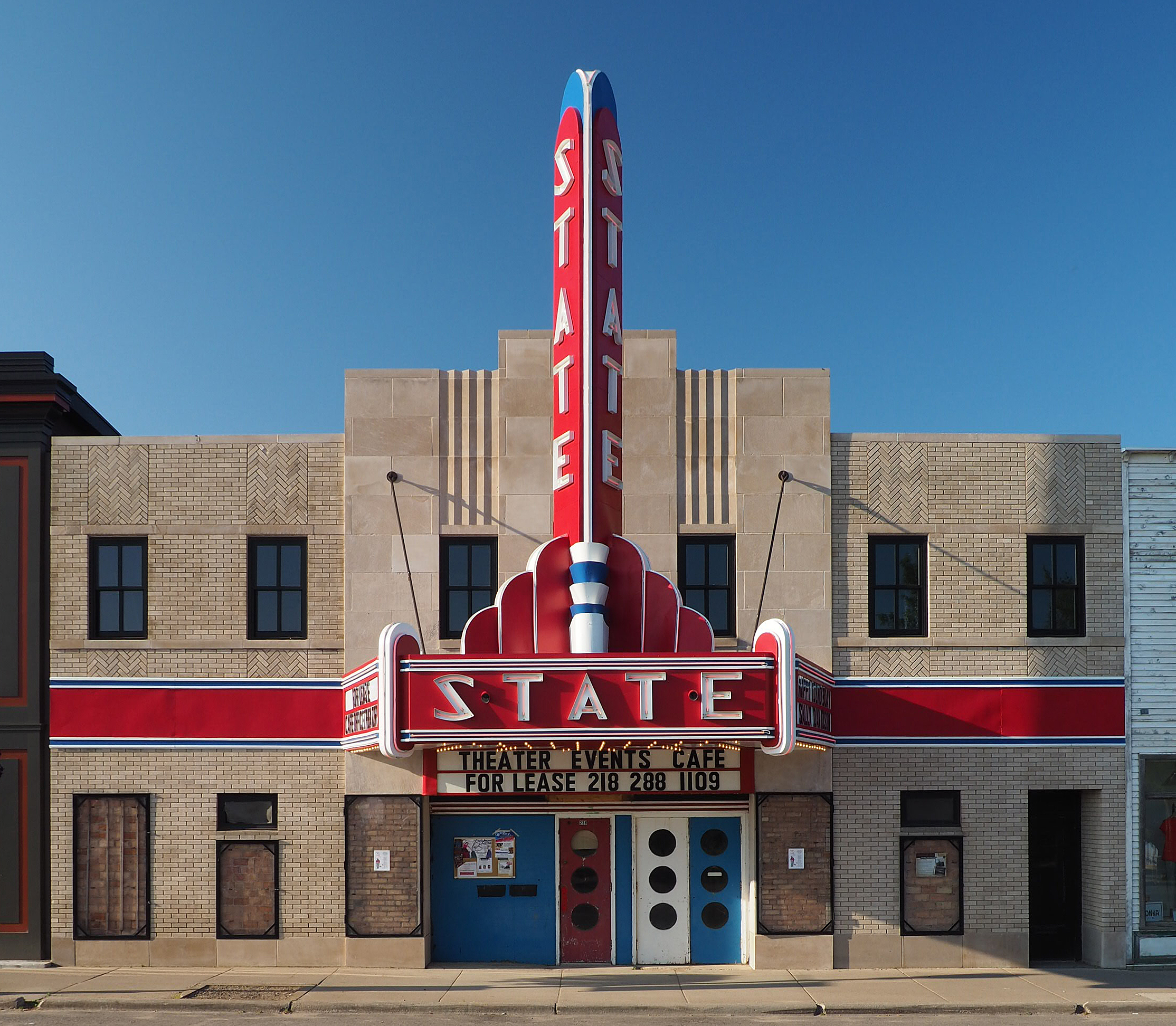
- Ely's Historic State Theater viewed from the north

- Location within Minnesota Location within the United States
- Location: 238 E. Sheridan Street, Ely, Minnesota
- Coordinates: 47°54′11″N 91°51′46.5″W
- Area: Less than one acre
- Built: 1936
- Built by: J. N. Rautio Builders
- Architect: Liebenberg and Kaplan
- NRHP reference No.: 15000440
- Designated: July 21, 2015

The Ely State Theater is a historic movie theater in Ely, Minnesota, United States. It was designed by Liebenberg and Kaplan in Streamline Moderne style and built in 1936. The theater was listed on the National Register of Historic Places in 2015. It was nominated for epitomizing the small-town commissions of Liebenberg and Kaplan, the leading movie theater designers in the Upper Midwest during the Golden Age of Hollywood.

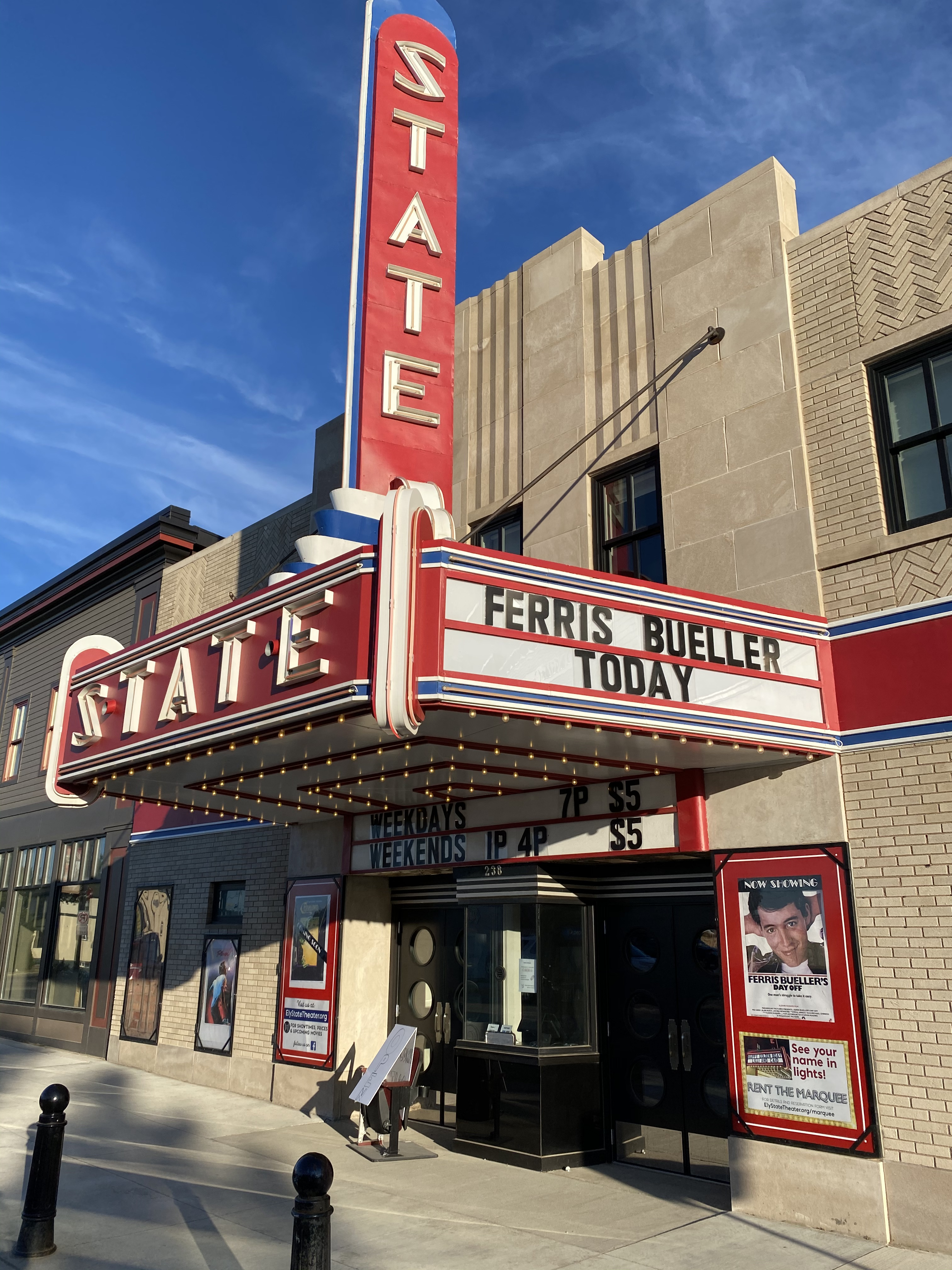
June 24th, 2020

The Ely State Theater closed in 2008 due to the Great Recession. The building quickly fell into disrepair. Restoration efforts began in 2014 and reopened in December 2019 with local live theater in a showing of "The Quiltmaker's Gift." On June 24, 2020, the theater held its first film screening in over a decade, featuring Ferris Bueller's Day Off. Ely's Historic State Theater is now open to the public and is a cinema and live event venue with an attached concessions area and second theater in the adjacent building. There is a one-bedroom apartment above the lobby and is available as a short-term rental on Air B&B.

== See also ==
- National Register of Historic Places listings in St. Louis County, Minnesota

== Gallery ==
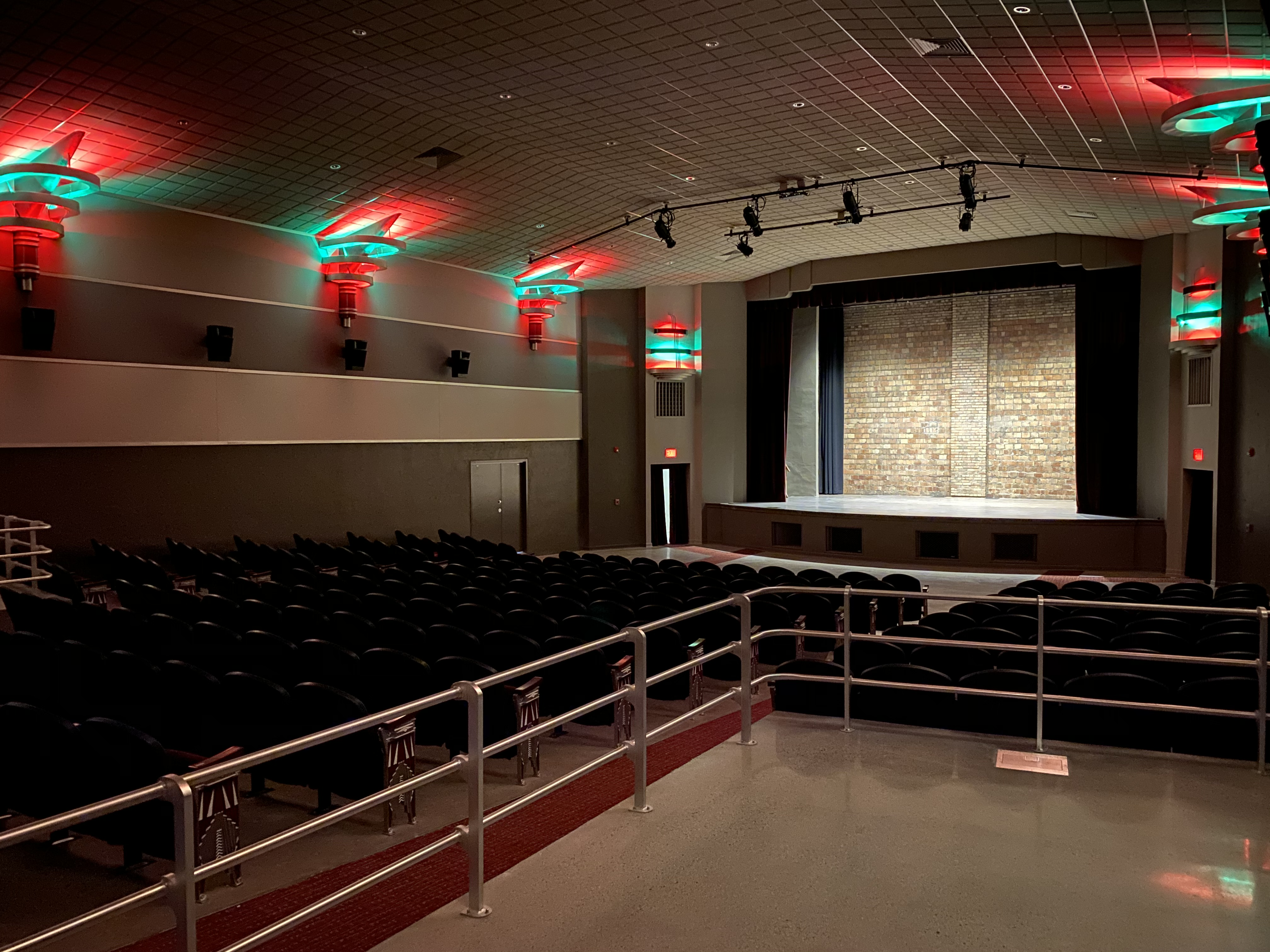
Interior

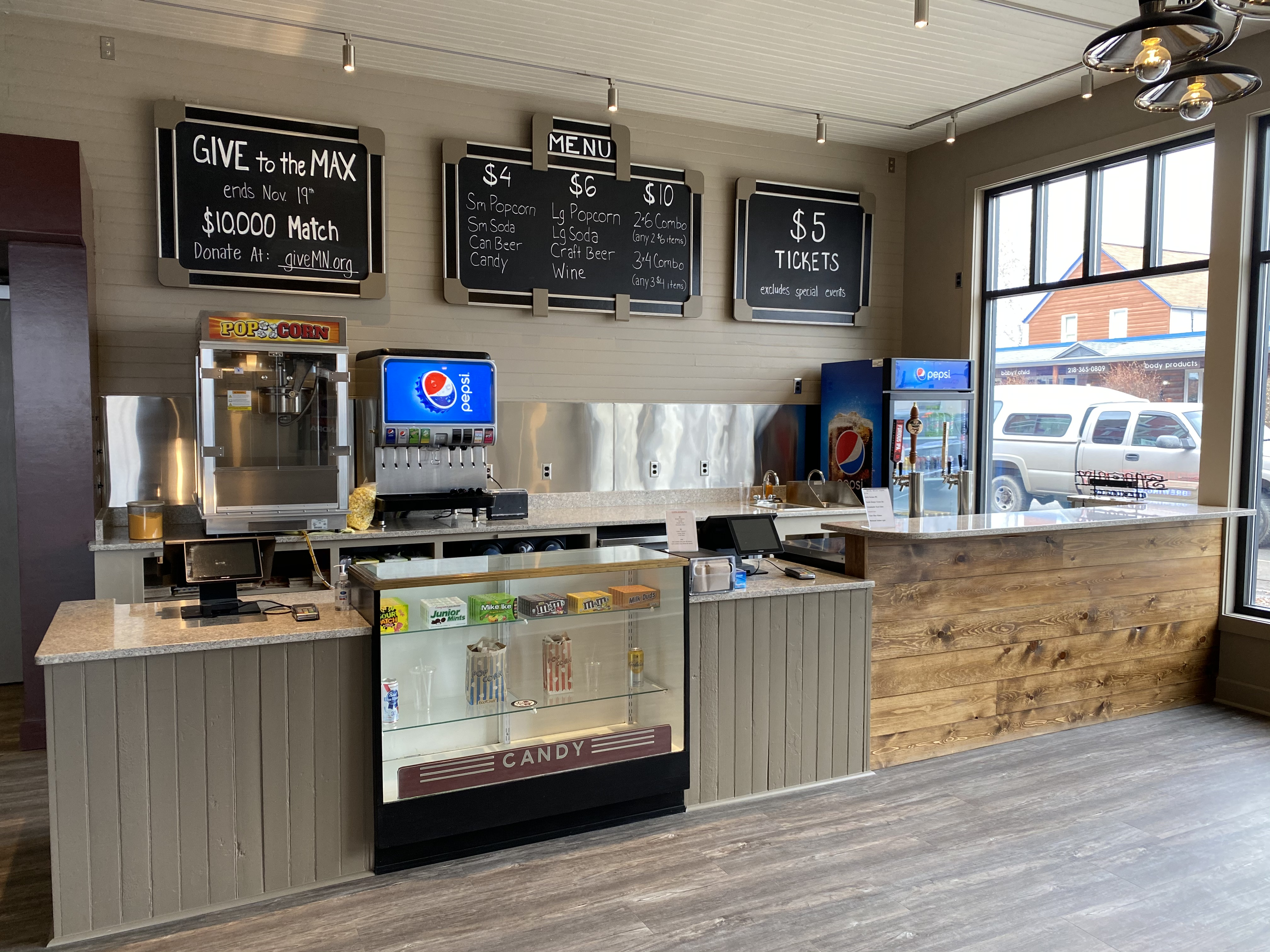
Concessions Area in adjacent building
