= Trylon Cinema =

Movie theater in Minneapolis, Minnesota

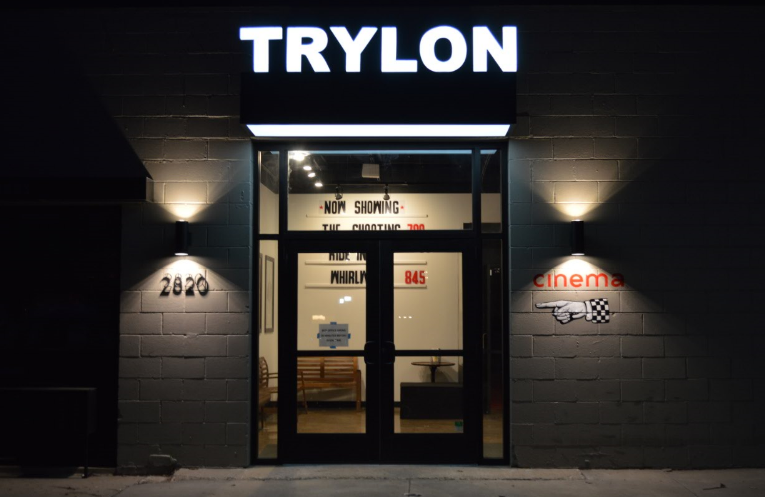
- Exterior of the Trylon Cinema, April 2018
- Interactive map of Trylon Cinema
- Former names: Trylon Microcinema
- Address: 2820 East 33rd Street, Minneapolis, Minnesota, United States
- Coordinates: 44.9432948°N 93.2329897°W
- Operator: Take-Up Productions
- Seating type: Rocking
- Capacity: 90
- Type: Indoor microcinema

Construction
- Opened: July 17, 2009

Website
- trylon.org

The Trylon Cinema (formerly Trylon Microcinema) is a 90-seat movie theater in the Longfellow neighborhood of Minneapolis, Minnesota. The cinema was founded and is currently run by Take-Up Productions, a group of volunteers who got their start at the Oak Street Cinema before establishing the Trylon in 2009 within a former warehouse. A 2017 expansion resulted in an increase in the cinema's seating capacity and accessibility. Throughout its history, the venue has featured a variety of regular programming, ranging from career retrospectives of famous directors to B movies and cult films. The Trylon has been well received by critics who have praised its film lineup, intimacy, and atmosphere.

== History ==
Minneapolis's Oak Street Cinema, a volunteer-run repertory cinema, ran films seven days per week until cutbacks in programming had to be made for financial reasons. A collective of the Oak Street volunteers formed Take-Up Productions, which was established to promote showing films not typically screened in larger movie houses. The organization began with outdoor screenings, starting with Watermelon Man, which was projected against a white brick wall behind a coffee shop, and then began to rent out theaters throughout the Minneapolis–Saint Paul area, including the Riverview, Heights, and Parkway. Some screenings, such as that of Lawrence of Arabia and a series of Alfred Hitchcock films, drew hundreds of viewers.

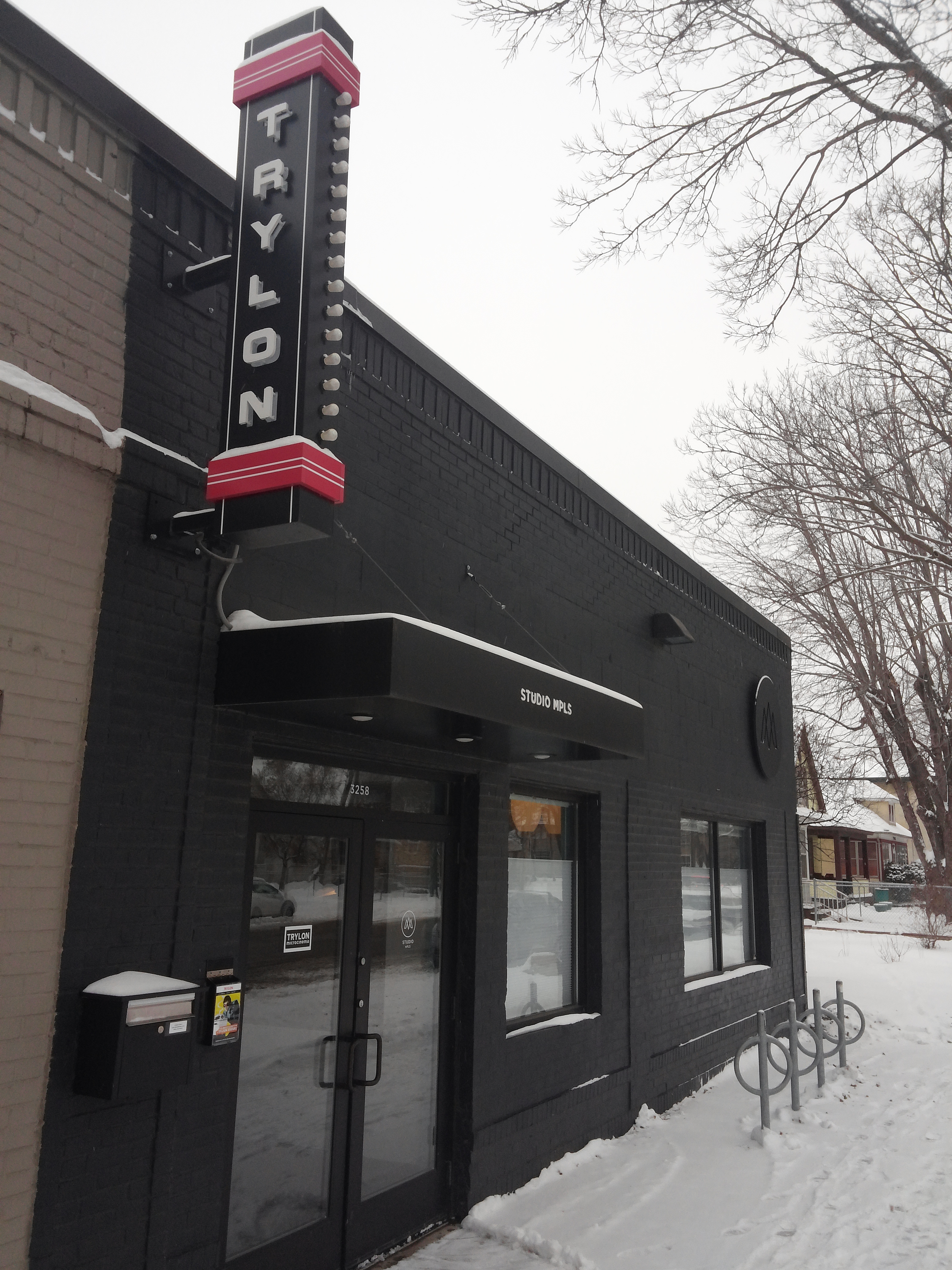
Trylon's original facade on Minnehaha Avenue

Barry Kryshka of Take-Up Productions, a 501(c)(3) nonprofit organization, oversees and manages the Trylon. The cinema sits in an old warehouse in the Longfellow neighborhood along Minnehaha Avenue that was rented, in 2009, at a rate of $800 a month. Kryshka contracted Bright Star Systems, Inc. to retrofit the space with 50 old rocking seats purchased from a nearby cinema chain, a 20-foot (6.1 m) projection screen, two 35 mm movie projectors, and a minute concessions stand. Trylon acquired its name from an eponymous theater in Kryshka's native Queens, New York, itself named for the Trylon sculpture at the 1939 New York World's Fair. Founded as Trylon Microcinema, the movie house opened on the weekend of July 17–18, 2009, with a showing of Sherlock Jr. featuring live musical accompaniment from Dreamland Faces, a local accordion–musical saw duo. Each of the venue's first 12 showings sold out.

The Trylon closed for three months in summer 2017 as Kryshka supervised a major renovation and expansion of the theater, at a projected cost of $175,000. MSR Design of Minneapolis worked pro bono to create updated architectural plans. As part of the renovation, the entrance was moved from Minnehaha Ave to 33rd Street. An outdoor courtyard was created outside the entrance, a new lobby and concession stand were built, and the space was updated to be more accessible to wheelchair users. The auditorium was expanded from 50 to 90 seats, and a new screen and sound system were added. Relinquishing the Microcinema moniker, the movie house reopened as the Trylon Cinema over the weekend of September 22–24, 2017, with screenings of Charlie Chaplin's The Great Dictator.

Due to the COVID-19 pandemic, Trylon closed from mid-March 2020 until July 3. During the temporary closure, no employees were laid off and Krysha and the rest of the staff were able to install a new digital projector in the theater. Trylon reopened at a reduced capacity of 20 seats with a screening of Attack the Block.

== Programming and reception ==
Every three months, the Trylon Cinema publishes a full schedule of screenings, most of which are second-run films. Scheduled programming can focus on specific genres or act as retrospectives on a particular actor, director or writer. The venue also features a variety of regular exhibitions, ranging from the Trash Film Debauchery series of B movies to Sound Unseen, a documentary project covering behind-the-scenes aspects of musicians' creative processes. Today, the theater hosts five regular rental programs as well as operates as the home for the Cult Film Collective, an organization dedicated to projecting and preserving 35mm and 16mm film prints. Take-Up Productions continues to use other venues such as the Heights and the Riverview for screenings necessitating larger houses. The Cinema is staffed almost entirely with volunteers.

Critical reception for the Trylon has been positive. It was voted the best movie theater in the Minneapolis–Saint Paul area in 2011, 2012 and 2018 by City Pages, which stated in 2018 that the cinema "offers film series and selections you won't find anywhere else in Minnesota. That includes kung fu hits, golden-era Hollywood movies, rare music documentaries, B-horror flicks, and, thanks to monthly sessions with Trash Film Debauchery, really weird films that time forgot". In an unranked list of Minneapolis–Saint Paul's best cinemas written for WCCO, Eric Henderson called the Trylon the "pluckiest upstart in the Twin Cities" and described the experience of walking into the theater as "stepp[ing] onto the set of a Michel Gondry fantasy-noir about a scrappy theater thriving in the midst of a Prohibition-style ban on the moviegoing experience." J. L. Sosa lauded the Trylon on Film School Rejects, praising the concessions selection, the physical intimacy of the space, and the cinema's programmers for their "impeccable taste in both high- and lowbrow culture."
