= Terrace Theatre (Minnesota) =

Theatre in Robbinsdale, Minnesota, US

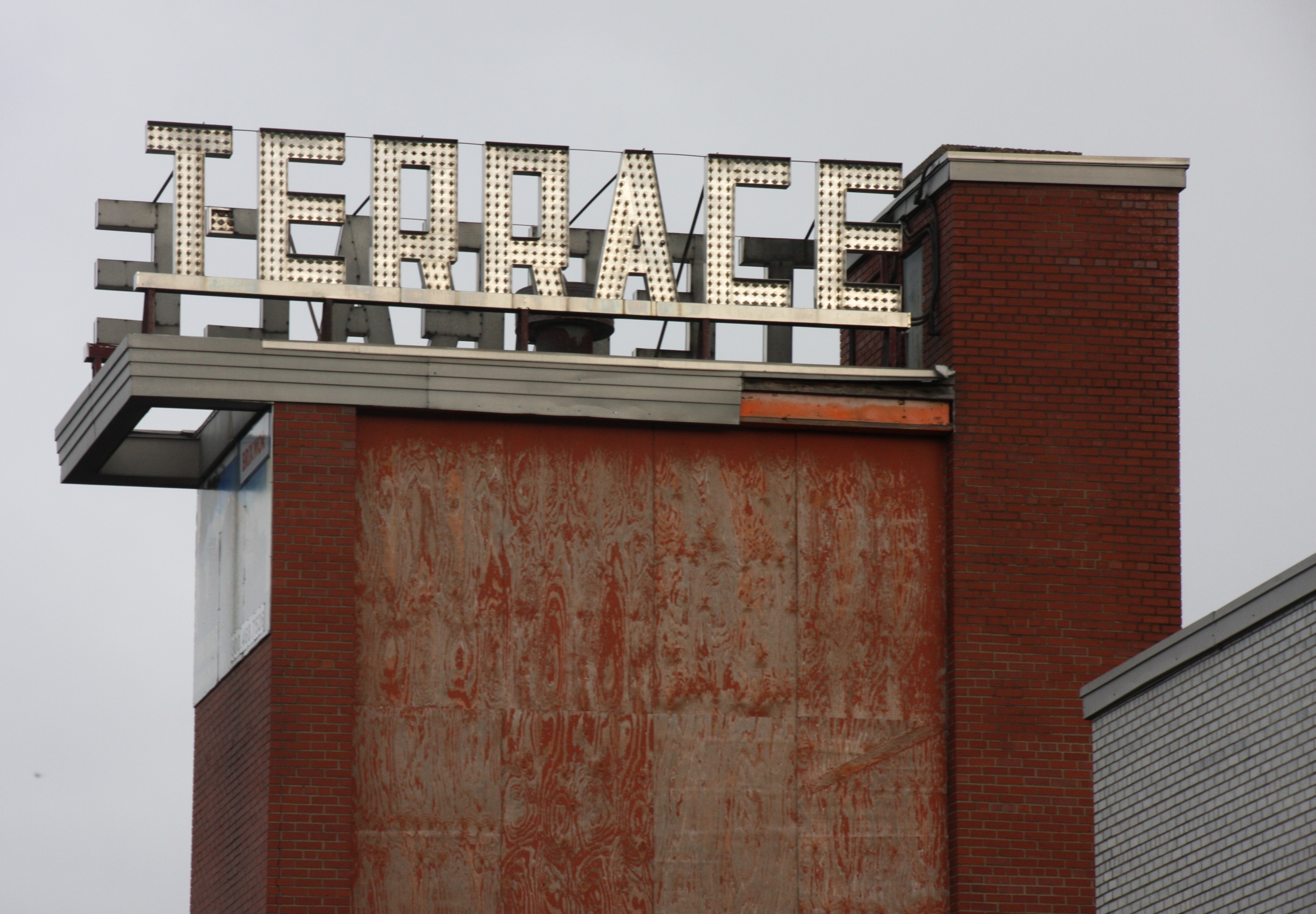
- The Terrace Theatre marquee in 2016

- Location within Minnesota
- Address: 3508 France Ave. N. Robbinsdale, Minnesota

Construction
- Opened: 1951
- Renovated: 1960
- Closed: 1999
- Demolished: 2016
- Architect: Liebenberg and Kaplan

The Terrace Theatre was located at 3508 France Avenue North in Robbinsdale, Minnesota. Upon its opening on May 23, 1951, the Terrace received critical acclaim for its “bold architectural lines [and] extensive patron services.” The 1,299-seat theater, designed in the mid-century modern style by the Minneapolis architectural firm of Liebenberg & Kaplan (L&K) for movie exhibitors Sidney and William Volk, was a popular Twin Cities destination for nearly fifty years. It changed hands in 1980 and again in 1987, when it was remodeled from a single-screen auditorium into three screens by dividing the balcony. The last movie was screened in 1999 and the theater remained boarded up for seventeen years before it was demolished in the fall of 2016 to be replaced by a Hy-Vee grocery store.

According to architectural historian Larry Millett, the Terrace was "among the finest movie theaters of its time in the United States." Despite efforts to preserve the theater, place it on the National Register of Historic Places, and restore it as a multi-use facility, the Robbinsdale City Council approved demolition in August 2016 and issued a permit in September. A lawsuit had been filed to prevent demolition, but the theater was demolished before the case was heard in court.

== Design ==
The theater "was instantly acclaimed as a masterpiece of mid-century design" upon opening. L&K designed notable residential and commercial buildings, but the firm came to specialize in movie theaters, designing the plans for construction and/or remodeling of more than two hundred theaters in the upper Midwest, including Minnesota, Iowa, Wisconsin, and North and South Dakota.

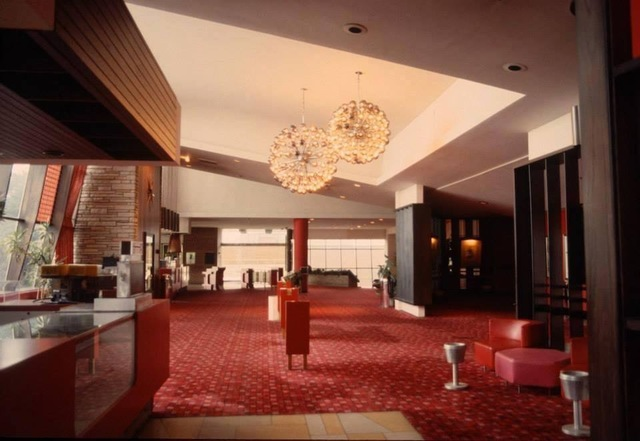
The Terrace Theatre lobby, 1970s. The theater was maintained in pristine condition under the Volks' ownership.

Most homes of this period were not air conditioned, so the theater's year-round cooling system, devised using 52-degree well water, was a summertime draw.

Inside the auditorium, the 26-foot (7.9 m)-screen was covered by a velvet curtain and fronted by a semicircular stage with carpeted steps between square stone planters. An innovative soundproofing material called Celotex (made of sugar cane waste and casein glue, originally used by L&K in their design of Temple Israel in Minneapolis and then at their first atmospheric theater, the Granada in Minneapolis) contributed to its excellent acoustics.

The auditorium featured sloped seating in the front portion and stepped stadium seating in the rear. The same design can be seen in other L&K theaters, including the Riverview Theater, which continues to operate as a successful movie house today.

== Site ==
The luxurious theater was built as the first phase of a 10-acre (4.0 ha) site design. The plans called for the theater to be the corner anchor, with a future addition of a shopping mall and public swimming pool, but the idea never came to fruition.

In 1980 a modern strip mall with an Applebaum's Grocery store (which later became Rainbow Foods) was added on the east side of the site along Bottineau Boulevard (then West Broadway), but it was not built according to the original L&K design. The 135,000-square-foot (12,500 m^{2}) Terrace Mall struggled to keep tenants and the grocery store closed in 2013. Located two blocks north of North Memorial Medical Center and adjacent to an outpatient clinic (formerly a Montgomery Wards store), the mall was torn down in 2017 following the demolition of the theater. The mall property and the block where the theater stood were purchased by Inland Development Partners in the spring of 2017 with plans to build a Hy-Vee grocery store on the site.

== Construction ==
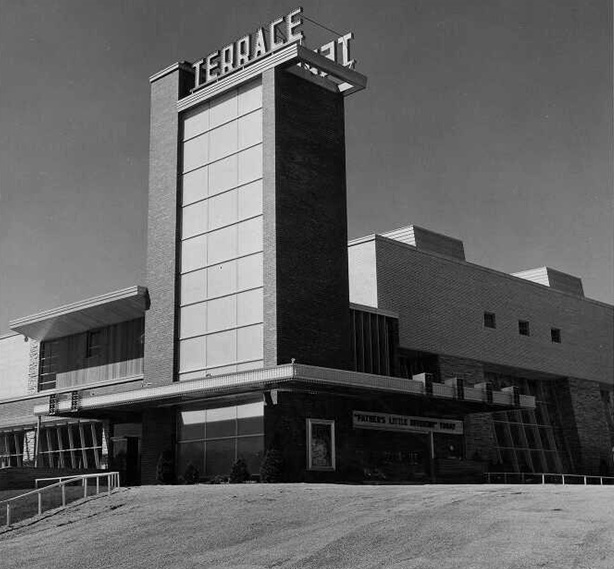
The Terrace Theatre opened May 23, 1951 with a showing of "Father's Little Dividend" starring Spencer Tracy and Elizabeth Taylor.

Materials chosen for the exterior included red and buff brick, stone, glass block windows, colored glass windows, and a metal canopy. A sign tower of brick, set off with backlit glass, was topped with the theater's name in bold capital letters. The primary entrance to the building was located at the northeast corner of the north façade. The interior gathering spaces were highly finished, with every detail planned by Liebenberg and Kaplan and the Volk brothers. While most of the interior finishes, fixtures, and furniture had been removed prior to demolition, widely published historic photographs and extensive project files held at the University of Minnesota's Northwest Architectural Archives have captured the unique character of the Terrace.

The theater opened on May 23, 1951, and until its demolition 65 years later all of the brick, stone, metal, and glass block remained intact, and the building was still structurally sound. According to Preservation Design Works, it was likely that the building's historic colored glass windows were also extant under the layer of plywood at the interior and exterior. As of the date of submission to the National Park Service for historic preservation, the theater's interior, lobby, and foyer retained original materials including Midcentury light fixtures, the stone and copper fireplace, and exposed stone and brick walls.

== History ==
Built at an estimated cost of $750,000, the Terrace was the first major movie theater to open in the Minneapolis suburbs after World War II, and it was one of the country's first ultra-modern theaters. Visitors from far and wide came to see the new "movie palace," billed as "America's Finest Theatre." A 1952 guest register showed signatures from 25,000 people from all 48 states and travelers from across the world.

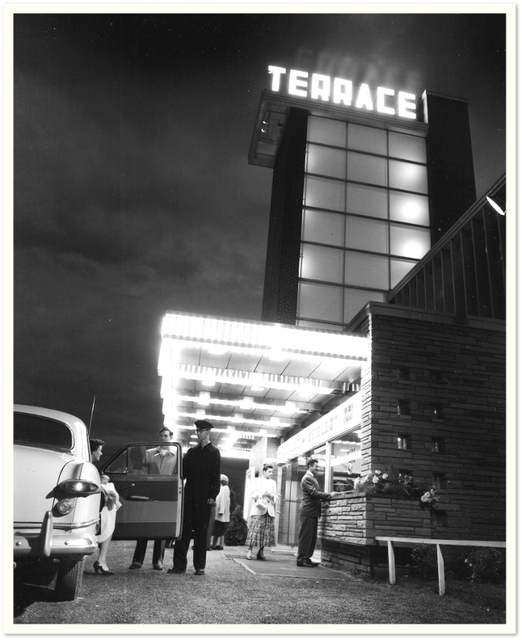
In the early years a uniformed doorman greeted patrons while drivers proceeded to the 1,000 car parking lot.

In 1955, as the theater's third anniversary approached, Post Associate Editor Bob Bork wrote, "The theater is operated by the Volk brothers, Sidney and William, both of whom also own and operate the Nile, Camden and Riverview theaters in Minneapolis. Why did they pick Robbinsdale as the location for the breathtaking Terrace? Most important, said Sidney, is the fact that it is adjacent to a large growing community. The Volk brothers planned the theater to serve all of the metropolitan area of the Twin Cities... One of the highest honors possible was bestowed upon the theater in 1952 when the Volk brothers received the international award for having the outstanding theater in United States that year. Covering 10 acres (4.0 ha) including parking lots and space not yet put to use, this theater also boasts the largest seating capacity of any suburban theater and the largest parking facilities... First-rate movies appear at the Terrace as early as possible, in other words, when they leave the downtown theaters. The Terrace can always boast that they are showing one of the top 10 films. The longest run enjoyed by any one film was for 11 days. The average showing is 4 days to a week, depending on public demand... Long range plans call for landscaping of the hollow behind the theater potentially including a lagoon.”

Over the years necessary improvements were made. The theater installed a wide CinemaScope screen with stereophonic sound in January 1954. In the 1970s, the Terrace was retrofitted with 70mm equipment.

The theater hosted major movie premieres and often provided free coffee and other refreshments to welcome movie-goers. In April 1984 musician David Byrne and director Jonathan Demme hosted the world premiere of the concert film Stop Making Sense at the Terrace. Featuring Talking Heads live on stage, the film was hailed by Leonard Maltin as “one of the greatest rock movies ever made.” Byrne became an enduring performer, returning to the Twin Cities several times over the decades, including his appearance as the featured act at Walker Art Center's "Rock the Garden" in 2004. Nearly thirty years after his appearance at the Terrace he brought his performing group to the Minneapolis Orpheum Theater (another movie house that had a Liebenberg & Kaplan stamp) on his "American Utopia" concert tour in May 2018.

The Volk brothers retained ownership of the theater until 1980, when it was purchased by Plitt Theaters. In 1987, Midcontinent Media ("Midco") purchased the Terrace. Midcontinent was founded in Minneapolis in 1931 as the Welworth Theater Company, an operator of movie theaters, and remained in that business until the 1990s, when it sold its theaters to various chains, including Carmike. According to a November 8, 1987 article in the Minneapolis Star Tribune, Midco Vice President Larry Kirschenmann believed that people still wanted to see movies on the big screen without paying the first run admissions. Under Midco's ownership, the auditorium was cut in half, with the front section retaining the large screen; the balcony space was turned into two separate, smaller screening rooms. This revised movie house, the Midco Terrace, opened with a showing of Roxanne starring Steve Martin, with a ticket price of $1. Splitting the once-grand auditorium seems to have marked the beginning of the end for the Terrace; in 1999 the Midco Terrace closed and the windows were boarded up.

Since its closing, according to a City of Robbinsdale proclamation, the theater "has received continued support from preservationists and historians as an important historical building, both culturally and architecturally," and that "for nearly 50 years, the Terrace offered family entertainment for the citizens of Robbinsdale and its surrounding area a place to go for family entertainment until the theatre closed its doors in the late 1990s." The proclamation, signed on by Mayor Regan L. Murphy and City Clerk Tom Marshall on May 3, 2016, designated May 23, 2016, the 65th anniversary of the opening of the Terrace, "Historic Terrace Theatre Day."

Governor Mark Dayton also proclaimed Historic Terrace Theatre Day, recognizing that Liebenberg and Kaplan brought the City of Robbinsdale and the State of Minnesota national attention due to the groundbreaking and innovative design work used in its construction as one of the first modern movie theaters in the country; that the theater was a longstanding fixture for family entertainment in the Twin Cities Metropolitan Area; and that it is vital to bring attention to historic buildings in order to show support for historic projects.

== Historic designation ==
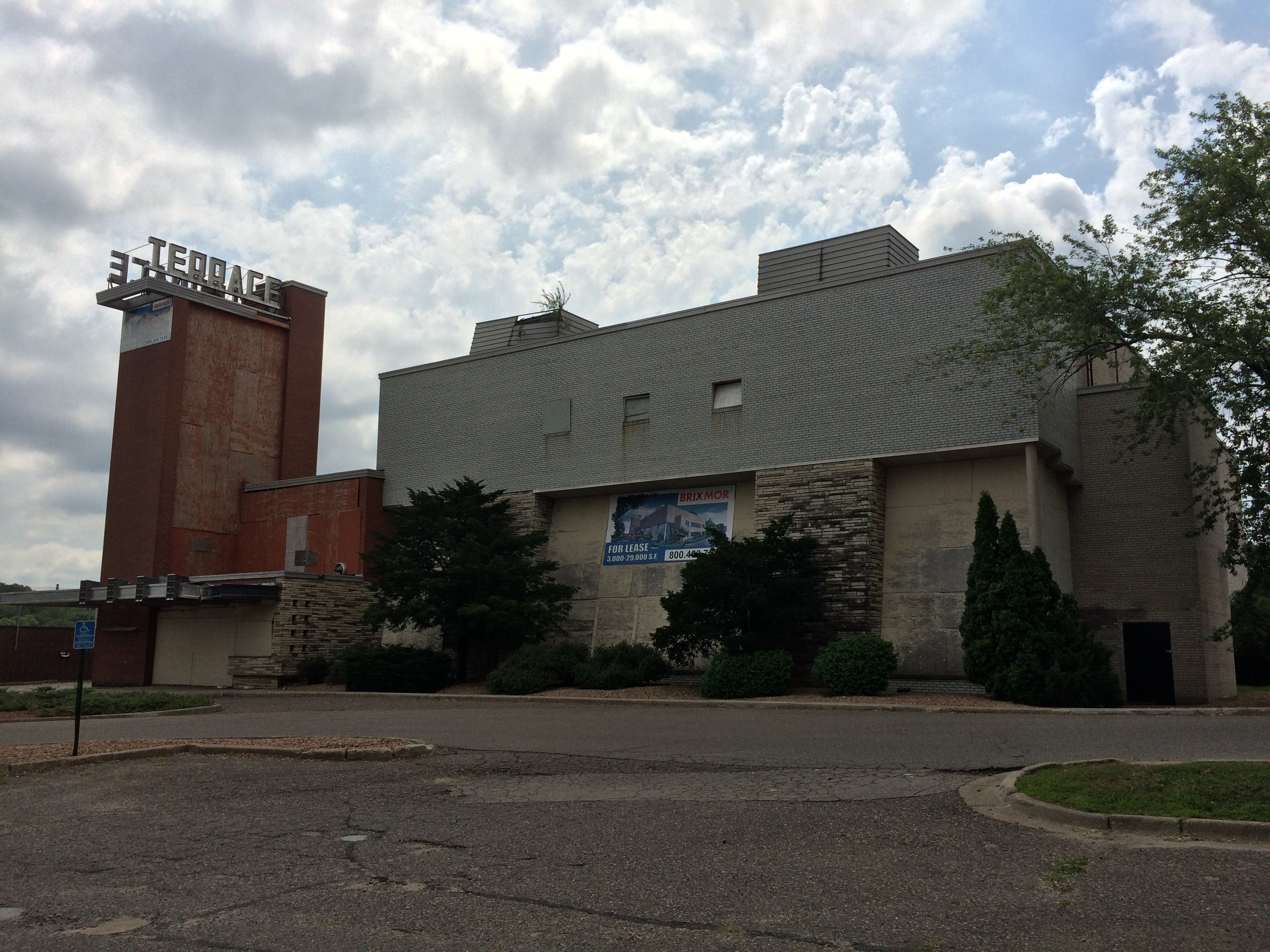
The theater in 2016

On August 15, 2015, the StarTribune reported that the Terrace was deemed eligible to be listed on the National Register of Historic Places in 2004 but the designation lapsed after a ten-year period. In 2015, Denis Gardner, the National Register historian for the Minnesota State Historic Preservation Office, said the theater is "one of the most distinctive buildings in Robbinsdale." Gardner said the Terrace was the culmination of L&K's "considerable theater-design experience and talents."

A nomination for the National Register of Historic Places was prepared by PVN in 2016. PVN's most prominent project, the Hollywood Theater in Northeast Minneapolis, is another Liebenberg & Kaplan-designed theater that was renovated after sitting vacant for decades. The firm worked with a developer, neighborhood groups, the City of Minneapolis, the State of Minnesota, and the National Park Service to achieve designation on the National Register of Historic Places, to honor its history, and to capitalize on preservation-related funding sources.

Though the Terrace had been unoccupied since 1999, its historic integrity was intact at the time of its demolition.

== Demolition ==
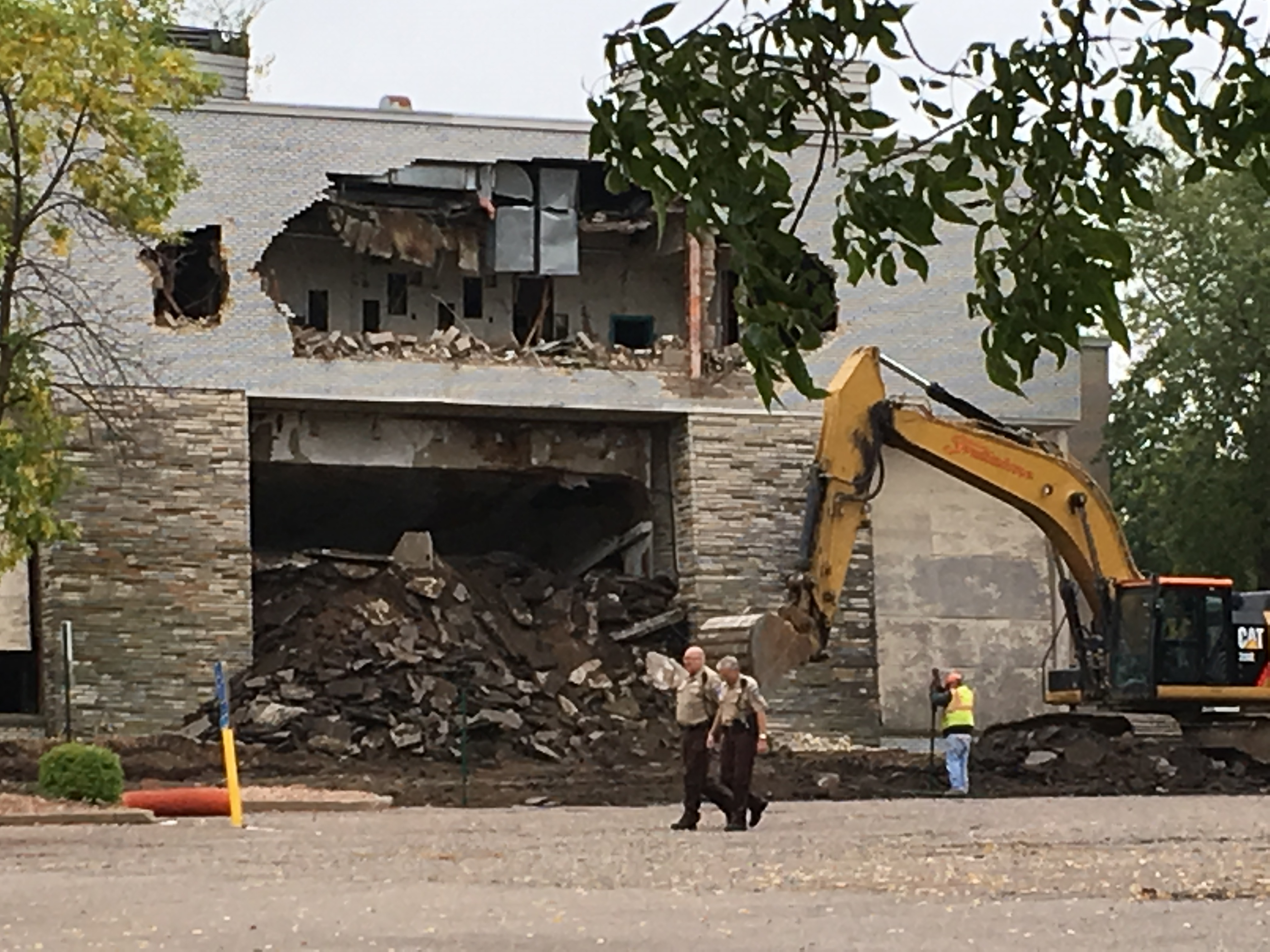
Partial demolition of the building in September 2016

In July 2016, the Robbinsdale Economic Development Authority voted to demolish the theater at the request of a developer to make way for a Hy-Vee grocery store. More than 2,200 people signed a "Save the Terrace" petition, but the City Council approved demolition on August 23, 2016 as part of a redevelopment plan that would replace the theater and the adjacent mall with a Hy-Vee.

The proposal became a flashpoint among community residents. Some asserted that the theater had become an eyesore and that the city needed a grocery store and the economic benefits it would bring; others, however, contended that the theater should be preserved for its historical significance and restored to its full potential, and that a grocery store could be built on the site without demolishing the theater.

A citizens group launched an internet petition against Hy-Vee and filed a suit with Hennepin County District Court on August 23 requesting that the demolition be halted. After the group's request was denied on September 19, an appeal was filed on September 23 with the Minnesota Court of Appeals asking that the court issue an emergency injunction to prevent the theater from being demolished. However, a demolition permit was obtained on Friday, September 23 and a crew began demolishing the theater the next day before the court could hear the case. A temporary restraining order was granted the same day by a Hennepin County judge and the demolition work was ordered to halt until September 27. On September 26, a judge's ruling required the citizens group to post a $2.8 million bond to the property owner and a $3.5 million bond to the city's Economic Development Authority by September 30.

The Preservation Alliance of Minnesota, serving as the fiscal sponsor for the citizens group that filed the suit, noted that "bond requirements are not unusual in preservation lawsuits, but the largest we had heard of was around $150,000. $6.3 million is excessive, and unprecedented. And it flies directly in the face of the Minnesota Environmental Rights Act, which states that ANY CITIZEN can file a lawsuit in defense of endangered resources." On September 29, the Minnesota Court of Appeals denied a request for a reduction of the amounts of the two bonds. Demolition then resumed on October 1, the day after the deadline for bond payment passed.

The reinforced concrete and steel frame structure withstood more than a month of demolition work. In December 2016, the landmark TERRACE letters that stood atop the tower for 65 years and the iconic "sputnik" chandeliers from the lobby were transferred to the Robbinsdale Historical Society. The letters were damaged during demolition and most of the bulbs from the chandeliers were broken.

Before demolition several groups of professional explorers found their way in and posted footage of their exploration on YouTube.

In August 2019, the Robbinsdale Historical Society and the Terrace Legacy Project exhibited damaged items recovered from the demolition, including the chandeliers, two restored marquee letters, photographs, and other memorabilia.

The Terrace Legacy Project plans to continue restoring and exhibiting artifacts as funds allow, so that people can still experience what was once "America's Finest Theatre."

== Robbinsdale Hy-Vee ==
Two years after the Terrace demolition began, the Hy-Vee grocery store opened on September 18, 2018, becoming the first grocery store within the city limits since the 2013 closure of Rainbow Foods in the Terrace Mall. The store joins a nearby Cub Foods, which sits a mile away in Crystal, across the street from Robbinsdale Middle School (formerly Robbinsdale High School) at Highway 100 and 36th Avenue North, and will also compete with the Crystal Target and the Lunds & Byerly's in Golden Valley, each about 2.5 miles away. The Twin Cities' first Hy-Vee is located 3.5 miles away in New Hope.

When it opened, the Robbinsdale location became the ninth Hy-Vee built in the Twin Cities metro area since 2015. Originally planned to be similar in size to other Twin Cities Hy-Vee locations, which range from 91,000 to 101,000 square feet, the Robbinsdale store is slightly smaller at 86,500 feet. Hy-Vee CEO Randy Edeker had stated in November 2017 that the Iowa-based company was reevaluating this size of its stores, expecting to focus on buildings ranging from 12,000 to 50,000 square feet.

The Robbinsdale store was built at a lower grade than the theater and faces Bottineau Boulevard (Highway 81). A new stoplight was installed to allow entrance to Hy-Vee's parking lot and gas station directly from the highway. With the road work, the monument sign that for years served as a marker from North Minneapolis into Robbinsdale was demolished.

Hy-Vee, headquartered in Des Moines, states that it is "employee-owned by direct stockholders—officers, store directors and executive staff members—and indirect stockholders, the more than 30,000 Hy-Vee employees who participate in The Hy-Vee and Affiliates 401(k) Plan." The Robbinsdale store was originally estimated to provide 700 jobs. At the time of its opening, it employed about 500 people, including about 110 full-time employees.
