= Liebenberg and Kaplan =

Architectural firm in the United States

Practice information
- Partners: Jacob J. Liebenberg; Seeman I.Kaplan
- Founded: 1923
- Dissolved: 1973
- Location: Minneapolis, Minnesota

Significant works and honors
- Buildings: Temple Israel, Granada Theater, Hollywood Theater, Varsity Theater, Paradise Theater, Riverview Theater, Uptown Theater
- Projects: Terrace Theatre, Hennepin County Medical Center

Liebenberg and Kaplan (L&K) was a Minneapolis architectural firm founded in 1923 by Jacob J. Liebenberg and Seeman I. Kaplan. Over a fifty-year period, L&K became one of the Twin Cities' most successful architectural firms, best known for designing/redesigning movie theaters.

The firm also designed hospitals, places of worship, commercial and institutional buildings, country clubs, prestigious homes, radio and television stations, hotels, and apartment buildings. After designing Temple Israel and the Granada Theater in Minneapolis, the firm began specializing in acoustics and theater design and went on to plan the construction and/or renovation of more than 200 movie houses throughout Minnesota, North and South Dakota, Iowa, and Wisconsin. Architectural records, original drawings, and plans for some 2,500 Liebenberg and Kaplan projects are available for public use at the Northwest Architectural Archives.

== Partners ==
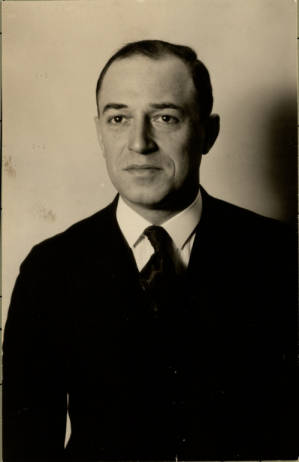
Jack Liebenberg, 1925

Architect Jacob "Jack" Liebenberg (born July 4, 1893), a Milwaukee native of German Jewish descent, arrived in Minneapolis in 1912 to work on construction of the Leamington Hotel. After learning that the University of Minnesota was starting an architecture school, he applied, was admitted, and became a member of the School of Architecture's first graduating class in 1916. He received a scholarship to attend Harvard University, where he obtained his master's degree in 1917. The French government awarded Liebenberg the Prix de Rome, a grant for a period of architectural study in Rome, but because of the outbreak of World War I, he was unable to take advantage of this scholarship. After serving in the U.S. Army Air Corps, he returned to the University of Minnesota as an instructor in the School of Architecture.

One of his students was Seeman Kaplan (born June 5, 1894), a son of Russian Jewish immigrants, who had worked as a draftsman and served as an officer in the Engineer Corps during World War I. The two became friends and Liebenberg eventually married Seeman's sister, Raleigh Kaplan. A Minneapolis native, Kaplan graduated with honors in architecture from the University of Minnesota in 1918.

While Liebenberg was teaching at the University of Minnesota, he was working for architectural firms such as the D.C. Bennett firm in Minneapolis. The William Wigginton house in the Tangletown neighborhood of Minneapolis is an example of Liebenberg's work for Bennett. The prairie box house was built in 1919.

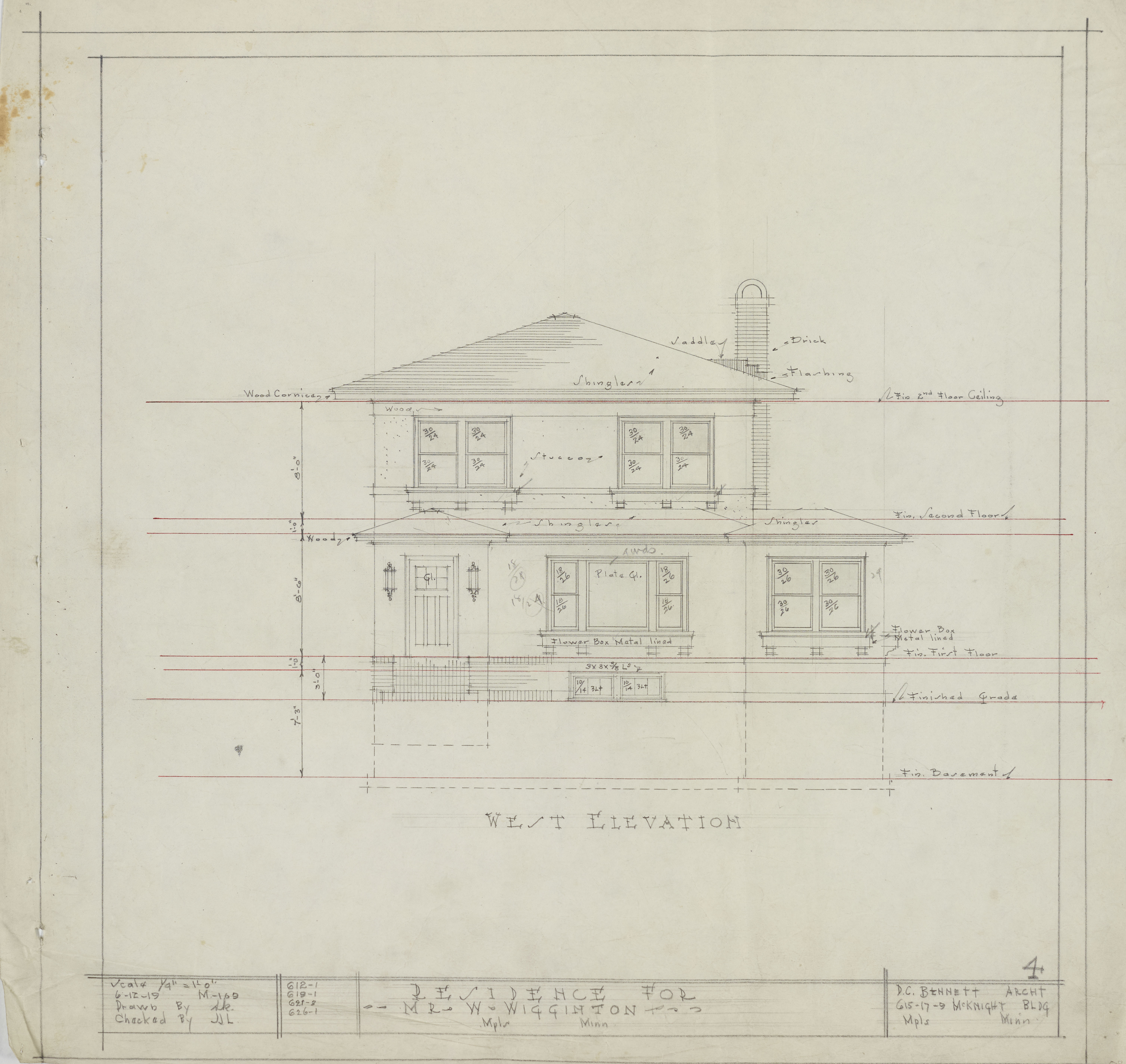
Front elevation plan for William Wigginton house

In 1923, Liebenberg and Kaplan formed a partnership, and over a fifty-year period the firm known as Liebenberg & Kaplan designed significant homes and buildings throughout the Twin Cities and beyond, many of which still stand. Kaplan focused on the business aspects of the firm and engineering details of their projects, while Liebenberg oversaw design. For the last twenty years of Liebenberg's career, Joel Glotter was also a partner in the firm.

In its early years, L&K was met with anti-Semitism, which was well-entrenched in the Minneapolis business community at the time, but in 1923 the firm was commissioned to design the remodel of the Arion Theater, one of the city's oldest movie houses. Many theaters at the time were owned by Jews; the Arion was owned by Louis Rubenstein and Abe Kaplan, who was Seeman Kaplan's brother.

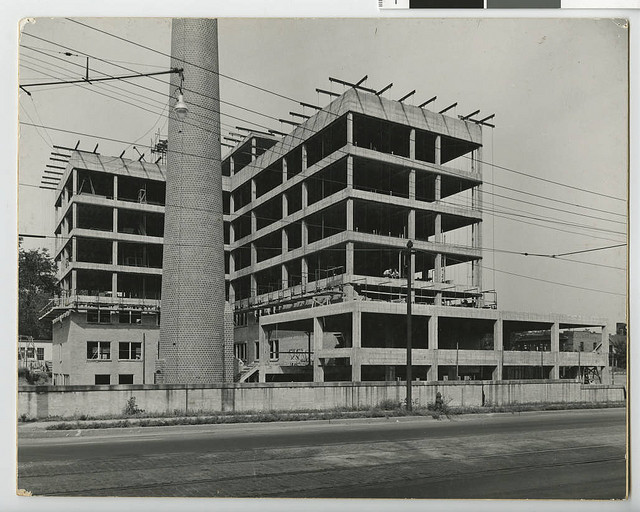
Construction of Mt. Sinai Hospital

=== Commercial design ===
The Minnesota Hotel, which stood at Washington and Second Avenues in Minneapolis from 1924 to 1963, was an early L&K project. Many other commercial designs followed, including several hospitals throughout the state; among them were St. Olaf Hospital in Austin (1939, 1954–55), Mount Sinai Hospital in Minneapolis (1951), and a portion of North Memorial Hospital in Robbinsdale (1962), as well as other hospitals throughout the state.

=== Places of worship ===
The firm's first for a high-profile commission was the design of Temple Israel (1928) in the Lowry Hill district of Minneapolis. Organized in 1878, the congregation had moved to the site in 1920 and in 1926 hired L&K to design a new synagogue on the site. An outstanding feature of the neoclassical revival–style building is the 950-seat main sanctuary, which became known for its superior acoustics.

L&K later designed a number places of worship in the Twin Cities, including Beth El Synagogue (1926) and a synagogue for the Adath Jeshurun Congregation (1927), both in Minneapolis, as well as the Moderne style Jewish Educational Center attached to the Temple of Aaron in St. Paul (1930). The Adath Jeshurun synagogue had a seating capacity of more than 1,000 and was the first synagogue to have a chapel; the structure is still standing and is currently home to First Universalist Church.

Many other churches of various denominations designed by the firm still stand in the Twin Cities and greater Minnesota, including Hope Presbyterian Church in Richfield (1954).

=== Architectural acousticians and theater designers ===
The firm's success with acoustics at Temple Israel led to the emergence of L&K's theater specialization. In 1927 theater owners Rubenstein and Kaplan hired L&K to design a place to show "Talkies," the Granada Theater (1927; later renamed the Suburban World). The architectural style chosen by L&K, with its Spanish-inspired Moorish atmosphere, reflected the trend toward "atmospheric theaters" and featured ornate balustrades, mock arched windows, and stars and moving clouds on the ceiling. Vacant since 2012, the Granada/Suburban World remains the only surviving example of an atmospheric theater in Minneapolis and one of few remaining in the state. Another atmospheric theater designed by the firm, the 915-seat Paradise in Faribault, Minnesota (1929) also had a Moorish theme; after closing in the late 1980s it was recently renovated and reopened as Paradise Center for the Arts, a 300-seat performance space that has been restored to its original splendor.

Every movie theater in the Twin Cities in the 1920s had been built to show silent movies. After the advent of talking pictures in 1927 and following the success of Temple Israel and the Granada Theater, Liebenberg and Kaplan were often called in by theater owners needing to update their auditoriums to improve the acoustics.

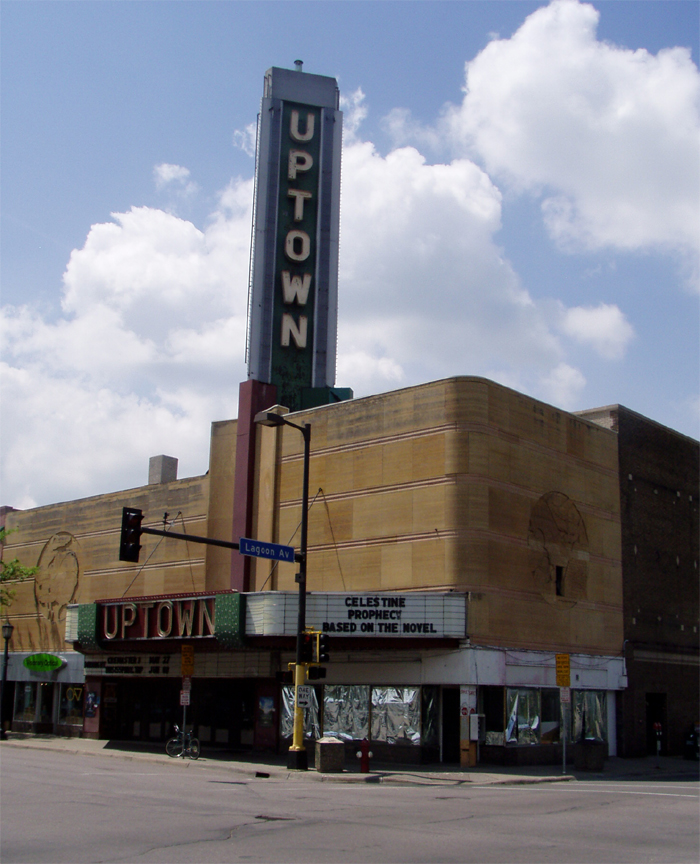
Uptown Theater, Minneapolis

The movie business was one of the few industries that thrived during the Great Depression; starting in the 1930s L&K was hired to design new movie houses in Minnesota and beyond. The firm became architect of record for prominent theater owners Finkelstein and Ruben, who later sold their business to Paramount; this led to L&K working for Paramount Corporation on small-town theaters throughout the Upper Midwest that needed extensive remodeling.

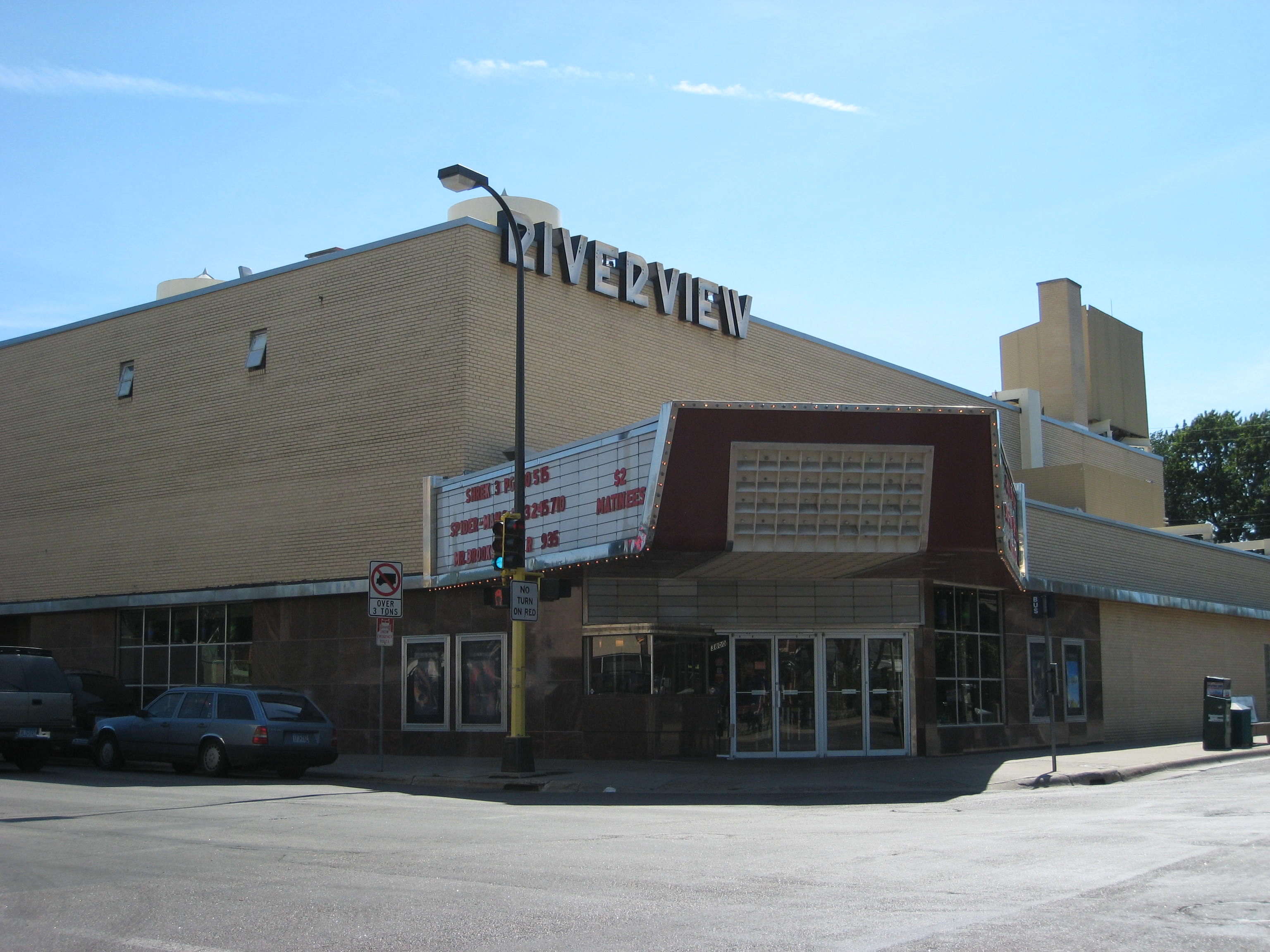
Riverview Theater exterior

Several of L&K's original theaters still function as movie houses today. L&K-designed theaters still extant in Minneapolis include the Hollywood (1935, "an early showcase of streamlined deco style: rounded corners, smooth surfaces, and asymmetrical balance"), the Varsity (1938, in Dinkytown near the University of Minnesota campus, now a music venue), the Uptown (1939, at the center of Uptown, Minneapolis), and the Riverview (1948, remodeled 1956, in the Howe neighborhood of Minneapolis).

In Edina, the upscale neighborhood of the Minneapolis suburb recently lost its L&K theater, the Edina (1934, once described as "a suburban temple of sharp-angled zigzag deco style") when it became a victim of the COVID-19 pandemic in 2021.

Other Minnesota theaters still in their original L&K structures are the Hollywood (1936, Litchfield) and the Chief (1937, Bemidji, now home to the Paul Bunyan Playhouse).

The partners also designed the 1936 remodel of the still-functioning Fargo (1926, Fargo, North Dakota), and the 1941 Art Deco renovation of the NorShor (1910, Duluth, Minnesota). One hundred years after its opening, the Duluth Economic Development Association purchased the NorShor with the intent to return it to life as a vibrant cultural center—serving the needs of the arts, dance, theatre and musical organizations from across the region. After a successful fundraising campaign, the newly renovated NorShor—with its L&K-designed Art Deco interiors still intact—opened with much fanfare in February 2018.

In northern Minnesota's Iron Range, two historic L&K theaters are currently under renovation; both are listed on the National Register of Historic Places. The Lyric Theater (1912; 1920s remodel, Virginia, Minnesota), originally built for vaudeville acts and silent movies and redesigned in the 1920s by Jack Liebenberg, is currently being redeveloped into a performing arts center. The Ely State Theater designed by L&K (1936, Ely, Minnesota), closed in 2008 but was added to the National Register of Historic Places in 2015. It is currently undergoing a five-year renovation, reopening as a film and performance venue in early 2020.

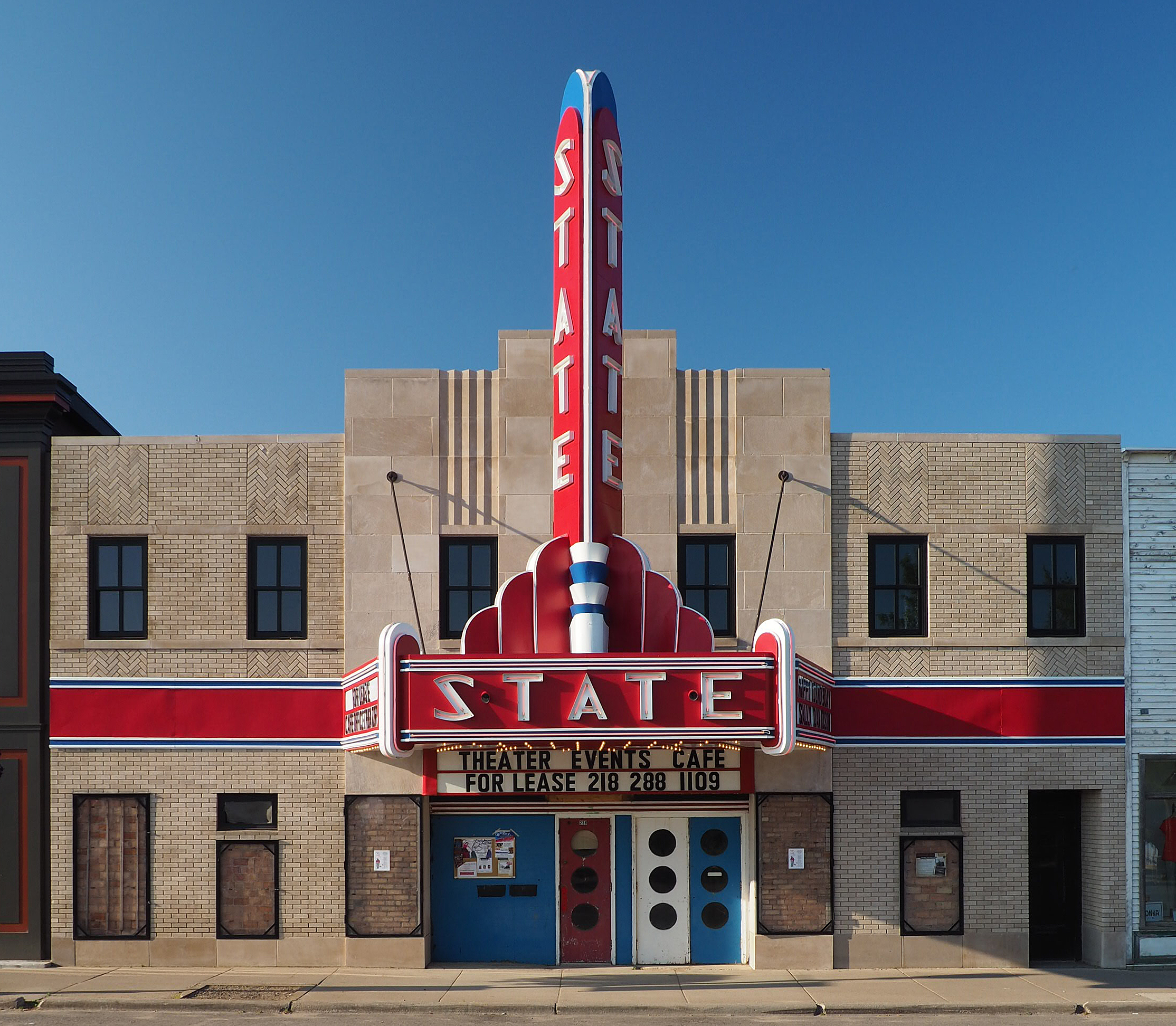
State Theater, Ely

Most of the theaters designed by Liebenberg and Kaplan were in the Art Deco or Streamline Moderne styles, including two built for Twin Cities theater proprietors Sidney and William Volk: the Camden (1938) and the Nile (1942). By the 1940s, the Volks owned three theaters in Minneapolis, one in St Paul, and one in suburban Robbinsdale.

The Volk brothers had planned to replace the aging theater in Robbinsdale before World War II, but theater construction was restricted during the war years. As a result, L&K's final two indoor theater projects represented a departure from the firm's earlier architectural style: both projects were designed in Midcentury Modern style. When construction limits were lifted, the Volks hired L&K to design the Riverview Theater (1948; remodeled 1956). Abandoning the Art Deco design of the prewar era, the firm created the Riverview as a "proper midcentury brick box set above a granite-clad base, with an angled corner entry pavilion ... solid, though a bit low-key compared to many of its earlier theaters".

In 1951, the Volk brothers called on L&K to finally draw plans for their new theater for the ten-acre site in Robbinsdale overlooking Crystal Lake. The firm's unprecedented design—"a cross between a movie house and a country club"—led to the construction of its "midcentury masterpiece—the magnificent Terrace".

==== Terrace Theatre ====
Upon its opening in 1951, the L&K-designed Terrace Theatre received accolades in the press. In an article titled "A Gem of the Lakes", the industry journal BoxOffice described the theatre as having "a feeling of fortress modernism. Blocky lines, broad expanses of large-paned windows and a massive light tower topped by the name sign express strength".

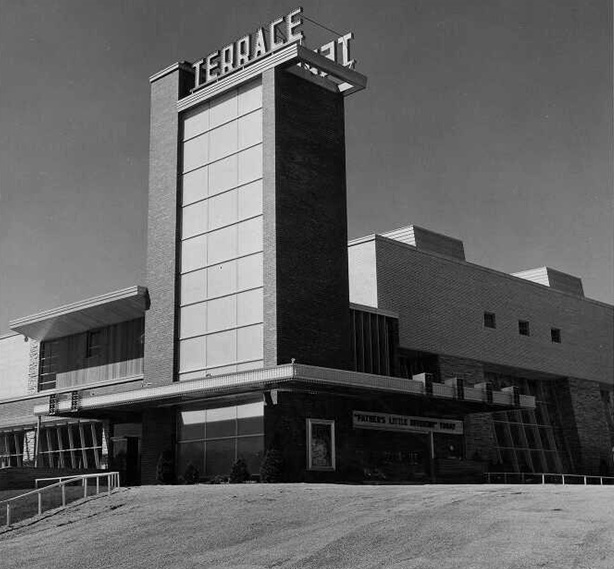
The Terrace Theatre, 1951

The architects embraced several popular Midcentury Modern design features such as geometric forms, tilted windows, a striking brick-and-glass tower, and large-scale signage. Two stone monument signs advertising the current feature stood at the driveway entrances. Exterior brick and stone were echoed in the interior, along with wood and copper, materials that reflected Midcentury residential trends. The Terrace was situated at the high end of the site with room for 1,000 cars, a nod to the automobile-centric postwar culture. The warm, elegant interiors included a sunken lounge with a copper fireplace, furnished like a luxurious living room of the day.

The one-of-a-kind Terrace Theatre was one of the country's first ultra-modern theaters, the Twin Cities' first major suburban movie theater built after World War II, and the last major movie theater designed by L&K. The StarTribune reported that the Terrace was deemed eligible to be listed on the National Register of Historic Places in 2004 but the designation lapsed after a ten-year period. In 2015, Denis Gardner, the National Register historian for the Minnesota State Historic Preservation Office, said the theater was "one of the most distinctive buildings in Robbinsdale" and that it was the culmination of L&K's "considerable theater-design experience and talents". A new owner changed the character of the building in 1987 by splitting it into three screens. The theater closed in 1999 and sat vacant for seventeen years. It was demolished in 2016 after a preservation effort by a citizens group failed to save the building.

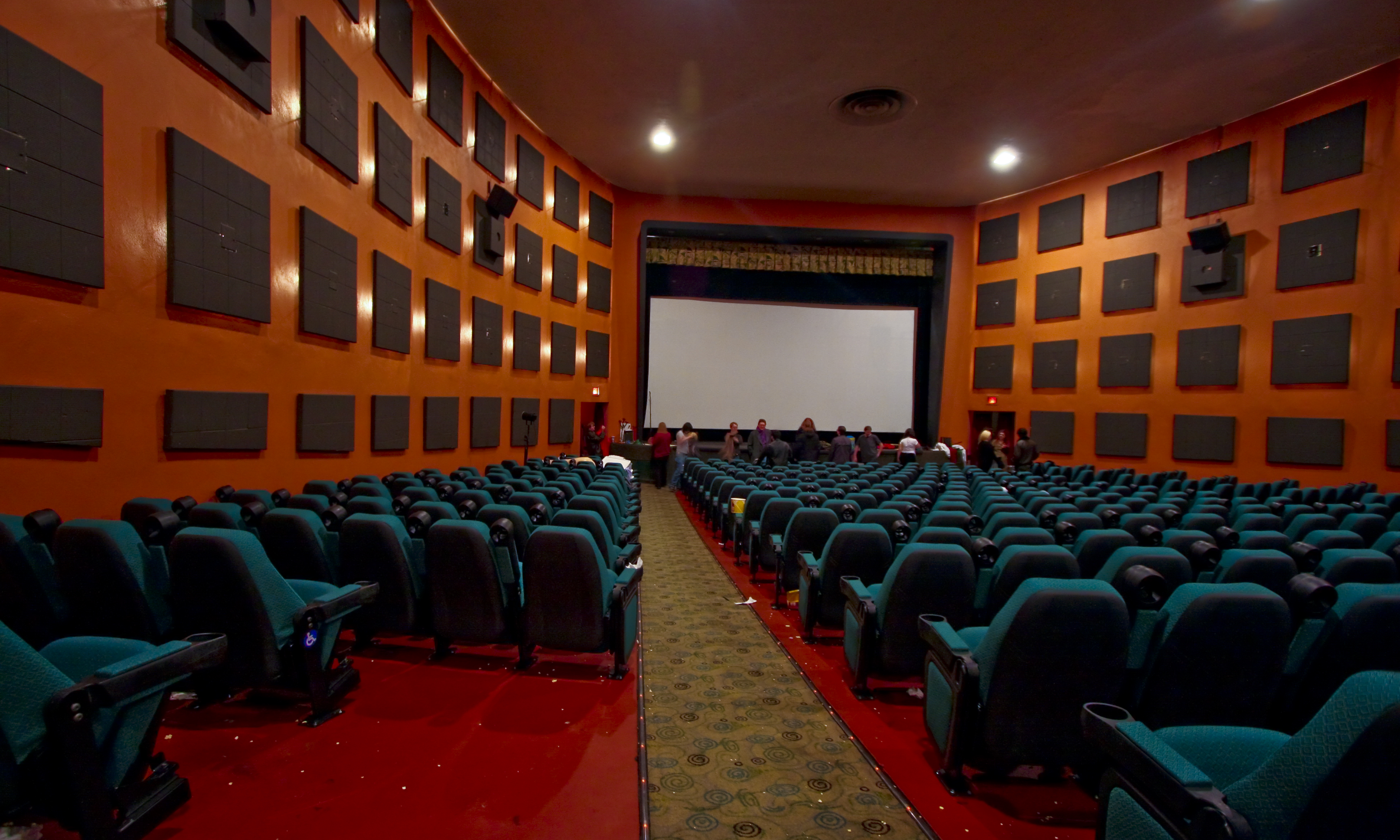
The Riverview auditorium resembles that of the Terrace.

Though the Terrace no longer stands, theater patrons can still experience some of its ambience at the Riverview, which preserves many of the interior features and furnishings of its 1956 L&K remodel, designed as a "postwar getaway reminiscent of the Terrace."

== Residential design ==
In addition to their work on theaters, houses of worship, and commercial buildings, Liebenberg and Kaplan made significant contributions to residential design in Minneapolis and surrounding suburbs, designing homes for the Davenport, Fredan, Hendel, Hochman, and Piper families, among other influential Minneapolis residents. Most of the prestigious homes the firm designed were in the Lowry Hill area of Minneapolis. A notable example of the firm's residential design in Lowry Hill is the Webster/Deinard residence (1924). Originally designed for George Webster, the residence was purchased in 1947 by Amos Spencer Deinard, who lived in the home until 1985. Amos and his brother, Benedict, sons of Temple Israel's first Rabbi, Samuel N. Deinard, were founding members of the longstanding Minneapolis law firm Leonard, Street, and Deinard, established in 1922. Amos Deinard practiced civil law, and was chair of the Minneapolis Fair Employment Practices Commission, which held its meetings at the residence. Mr. Deinard also founded the Minneapolis Federation for Jewish Service, among other accomplishments. The home is the only L&K-designed residence that has received historic designation (2014) and it retains virtually every element and material designed by its architects.

L&K designed Country Club District home, now on National Register of Historic Places

The firm also designed six model homes in a variety of historic revival styles for the Thorpe Brothers' Country Club Historic District (Edina, Minnesota) (1927–28). These homes are considered to have set the design standard for subsequent homes built in the district. Unlike other planned communities across the country, Samuel Thorpe's development didn't exclude ownership or residency by Jews or other ethnic minorities, but such potential buyers were known to be turned away by realtors, and it has been noted that no Jews lived in the Country Club development until the 1960s.

In spite of the 1919 Minnesota statute prohibiting discrimination in the sale of housing on religious grounds, the Minneapolis area was openly anti-Semitic throughout the first half of the twentieth century. In the 1930s L&K designed three contiguous homes in North Minneapolis referred to as "the closest thing to a mansion district on the North Side". The three brick homes in French Provincial Revival style are set on large lots with views of Wirth Park, and are among the twelve L&K-designed residences in the historically-significant Homewood subdivision, an enclave of middle- and upper-middle-class Jewish settlement during a period of intense anti-Semitism.

Following the success of the Terrace Theatre, Dr. Harvey Nelson called on L&K to design his family residence in the Tyrol Hills section of Golden Valley in 1952. The large home, which stands on a high-banked lot, exemplifies the classic Midcentury Modern raised ranch or split entry style. It features ample windows, dramatic spaces, and high-quality materials similar to those of the Terrace: brick, redwood, birch, oak, and slate. Its glass-enclosed foyer, with broad steps leading down to the lower level and up to the main living space, has been described as "theatrical." Thanks to Liebenberg's experience in commercial architecture, the home was not only well designed but well built with heavy-duty structural elements; it remains solidly intact and unchanged.

In 1955 then-Senator Hubert H. Humphrey commissioned the firm to design a family cottage in Waverly, Minnesota, a "retreat from the stress and pace of Washington". The home now serves as a chemical dependency treatment center, and its original living room is still intact, with its central fireplace and large, south-facing picture window overlooking Lake Waverly.

Architectural historian Larry Millett notes that some of Minneapolis's "snappiest apartments" were designed by L&K, including the six-story Calhoun Terrace Apartments (1959; now The Calhoun), situated on the north end of the city's chain of lakes and featuring corner windows, metal balconies, and a facade of southwestern Minnesota granite. The firm's 1961 "Hennepin Aristocrat Apartments" still stand on Hennepin Avenue in Uptown, a "highly decorated example of late midcentury design."

== Legacy ==
L&K's architectural success brought to life thousands of buildings in the Twin Cities and the Upper Midwest, either through original design or expansion/remodeling projects based on contemporary tastes and standards. In a 2015 article about L&K's accomplishments, StarTribune writer James Lileks cites the Hasty Tasty restaurant at Lake and Hennepin as "a reminder of what they gave the state, the hundreds and hundreds of structures that brought imagination and flair to everyday life". Many L&K-designed homes and buildings, both large and small, are still standing.

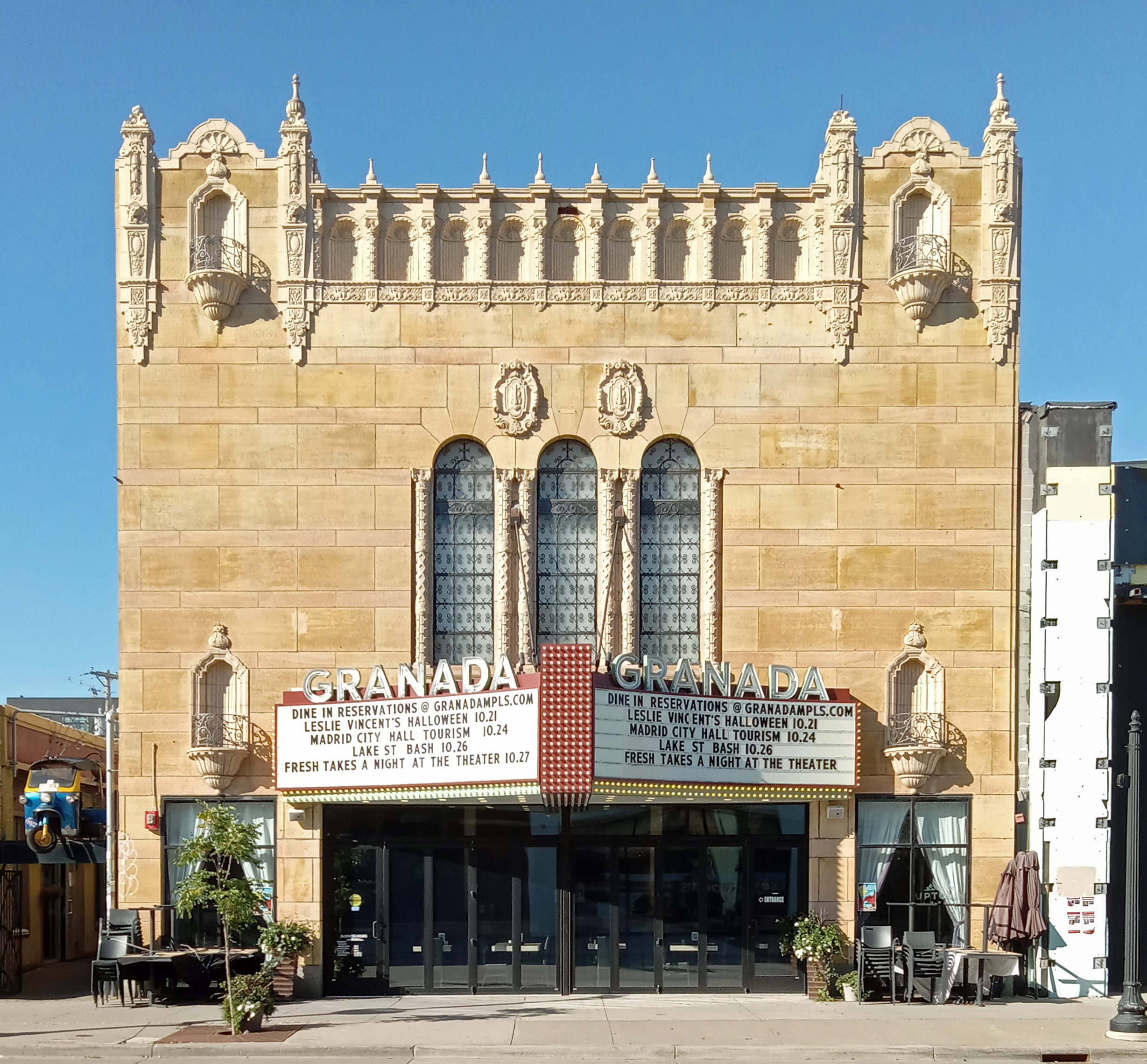
The Granada, L&K's first theater design

Of the more than 200 L&K-designed or redesigned theaters, few remain. In downtown Minneapolis, their lavish renovations of the Academy, World, and Gopher theaters were destroyed as a result of urban renewal, but the firm's 1929 Art Deco makeover of the State survives, restored in 1991 with city funding and now part of the Hennepin Theatre Trust.

The firm's first theater design, The Granada (later renamed Suburban World), showed movies from 1928 until it closed in 2003. Located in a high-rent area of Uptown, the building has managed to survive the wrecking ball, and after being vacant for five years it was purchased in 2018. The new owners plan to renovate and restore its original Spanish Revival style while converting the 6,000-square-foot space into a live music and entertainment space—the only one in the Uptown commercial district..

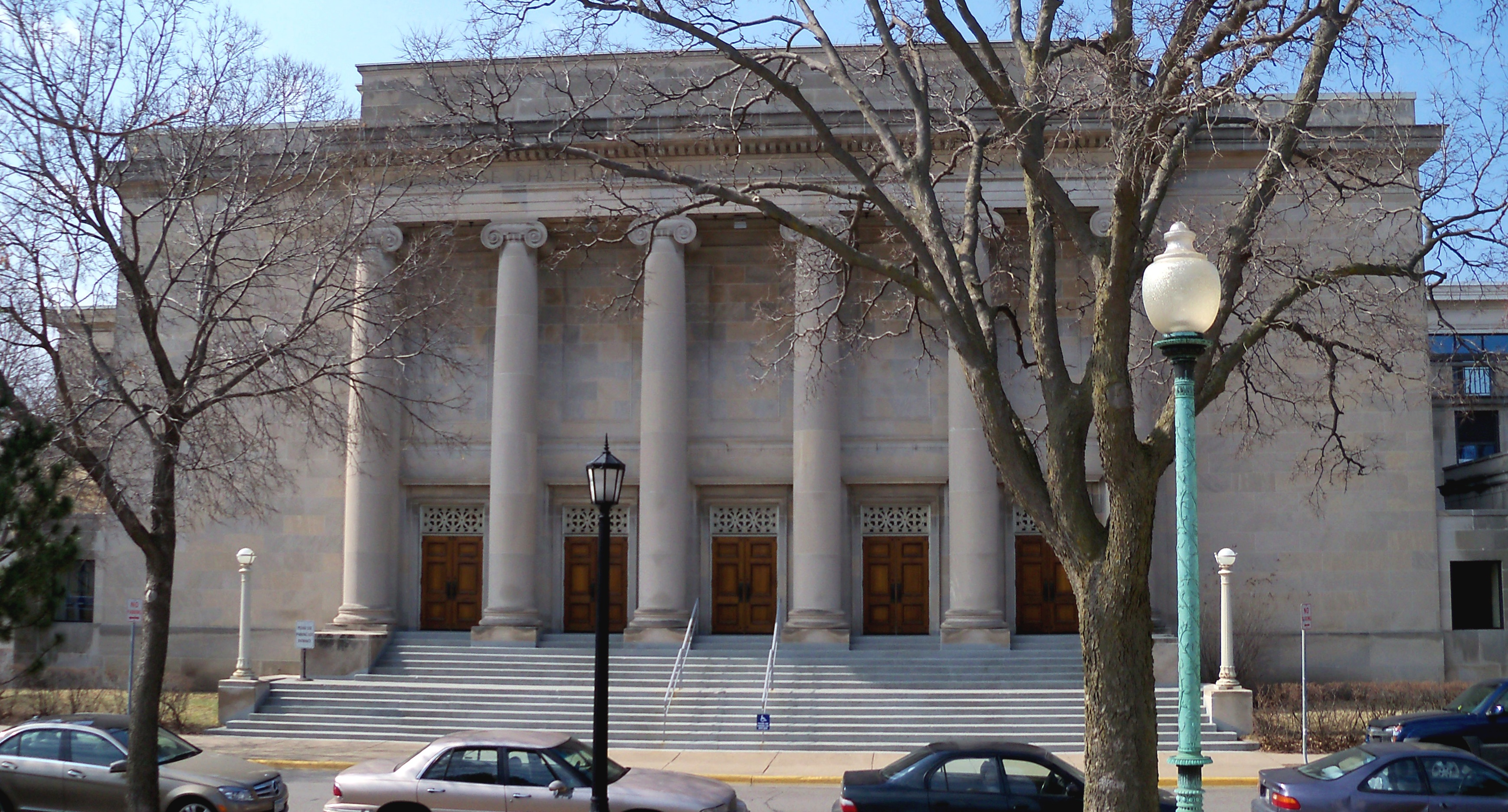
Temple Israel in 2012

In addition to Temple Israel (which has remained in continuous use by its congregation since its opening in 1928) and Adath Jeshurun ("considered one of the finest examples of synagogue architecture in the Northwest"; now First Universalist Church), several L&K-designed houses of worship still stand in the Twin Cities. The newly formed Valley Community Presbyterian Church in Golden Valley commissioned L&K for its 1951 building (the original chapel is now the lounge; the firm also designed the fellowship hall that was added in 1955). Hope Presbyterian Church, founded 1954, has a similar story, with its original sanctuary and a later addition designed by L&K.

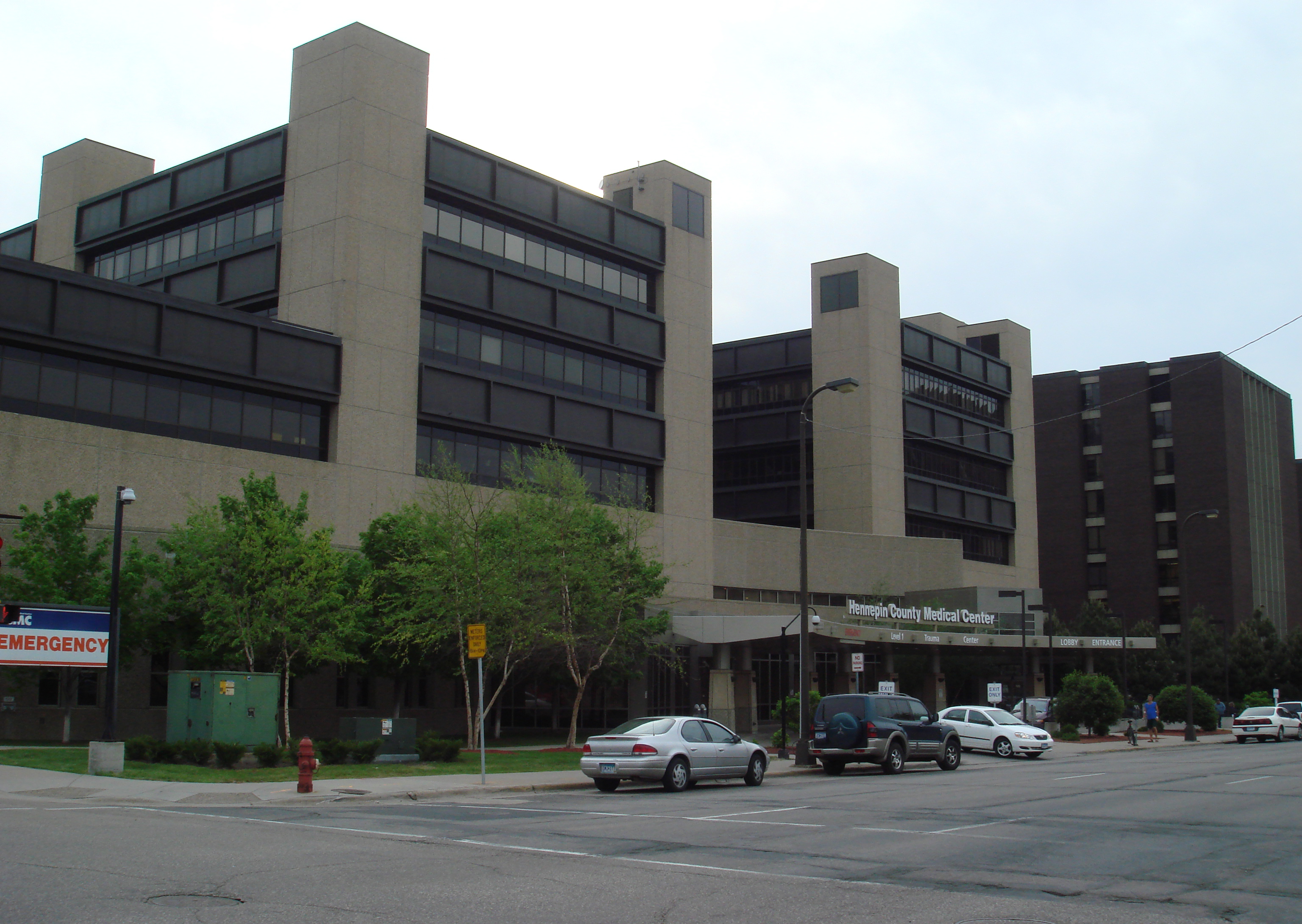
Hennepin County Medical Center in 2007

Surviving institutional buildings include the large, Georgian-style red-brick structure the firm designed by L&K for the Jewish Sheltering Home for Children in North Minneapolis (1934; renamed Oak Park Home in 1940), which remained in service until 1964; in 1997 it became the home of the nonprofit organization Avenues for Homeless Youth. Larger institutions that remain in their original L&K-designed buildings include the KSTP-TV headquarters in St. Paul (1948) as well as the Hennepin County Medical Center in downtown Minneapolis (1976). Jack Liebenberg was still at the firm at the time of the hospital's design.

Seeman Kaplan remained with the firm until his death in Tulsa, Oklahoma, on November 26, 1963; he was buried in the Minneapolis Jewish Cemetery in Richfield, Minnesota. Jack Liebenberg retained the partnership until 1973 and continued a private practice until 1980. He died in Edina, Minnesota, on March 23, 1985 at age 91; he was survived by his wife, Raleigh, his two daughters, seven grandchildren, and two great-grandchildren. His funeral service was held at Temple Israel.

As Lileks noted of the firm and the monolithic Hennepin County Medical Center, "it's possible to be born in a Liebenberg building and die in one—and enjoy some time in between watching stories in the beautiful rooms they made".

== See also ==
- National Register of Historic Places listings in St. Louis County, Minnesota
