= Oak Street Cinema =

Movie theatre in Minneapolis, Minnesota, U.S.

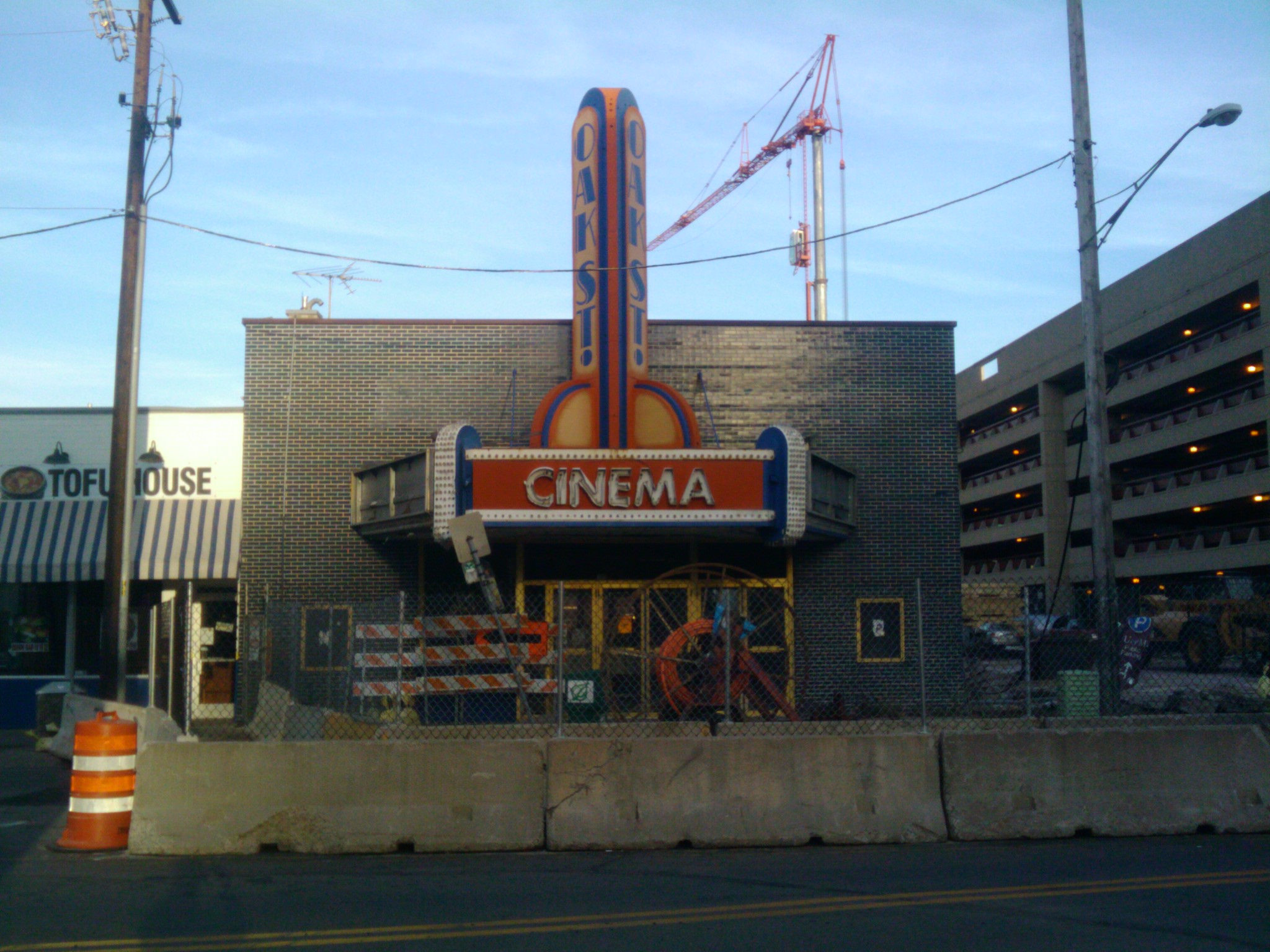
- Oak Street Cinema, in the early stages of demolition in 2011
- Interactive map of Oak Street Cinema
- Address: 309 Oak Street SE, Minneapolis, MN 55414
- Coordinates: 44°58′23.5302″N 93°13′37.0446″W
- Capacity: 312
- Type: Indoor movie theater

Construction
- Built: 1916
- Opened: 1916
- Renovated: 1935
- Closed: 2010
- Demolished: September 2011
- Years active: 1916-1989; 1995-2010
- Architect: Liebenberg and Kaplan

The Oak Street Cinema was a small, single-screen movie theater in the Stadium Village neighborhood of Minneapolis, Minnesota, near the University of Minnesota campus. The theater played both first-run independent films and repertory showings, including retrospectives of such filmmakers as Ingmar Bergman, Michelangelo Antonioni, Akira Kurosawa and others, as well as genre-based retrospectives. It had also been home to several local film festivals, including the Minneapolis-St. Paul International Film Festival. The theater has hosted visits from several well-known filmmakers and celebrities, such as Terry Gilliam, Michael Moore, Peter Fonda, Cyd Charisse, and many others.

The building was demolished in September 2011 after 95 years of existence.

== History ==
The theater, originally called the Oak, was built in 1916, but was renamed the Campus Theater in 1935 and remodeled by design firm Liebenberg & Kaplan, who also designed several other area theaters, including the nearby Varsity Theater, located on the other side of campus in Dinkytown. It was designed in Art Deco style, seated 312 people, in addition to a meeting area in the basement for film students. The Campus Theater closed in 1989, however it was reopened in 1995 under the name Oak Street Cinema under the direction of Bob Cowgill (formerly a professor at Augsburg University), Barry Hans and Randy Carpenter. The theater has been owned and operated by the Minnesota Film Art, an organization created when the theater, under Cowgill's leadership, merged with the U Film Society.

== Financial troubles and closing ==
When Bob Cowgill stepped down in 2004, the theater fell quickly into debt, in excess of $145,000 by the end of 2005. Cowgill's successor, Jamie Hook, was fired in September 2005 for mismanaging the budget and missing grant application deadlines. In the meantime, MFA board member Tim Grady loaned the organization over $75,000 to keep it afloat, guaranteed against the value of the property, which Grady estimated at approximately $600,000. By the beginning of 2006, the board of the Minnesota Film Arts publicly considered selling the theater, resulting in a protest by Cowgill and community members, under the auspices of the group Save The Oak, which they created for that cause. As of 2009, the theater was still struggling along amidst continuing financial troubles. Local papers reported that the theater was likely to be sold and demolished to make way for condominium development.

== Sources ==
- Covert, Collin (December 17, 2009). "Oak Street Cinema going dark, films move to St. Anthony Main". Star Tribune. Star Tribune Media Company LLC.
- Kardmas, Megan (March 6, 2008). "Hope flickers out for Oak Street Cinema". Star Tribune. Star Tribune Media Company, LLC.
- Kerr, Euan (April 10, 2006). "Arguing over the Oak Street's future". MPR News. American Public Media Group.
- Krefft, Bryan. "Oak Street Cinema". Cinema Treasures. Cinema Treasures LLC.
