= Uptown Theater (Minneapolis) =

Movie theater in Minneapolis, Minnesota

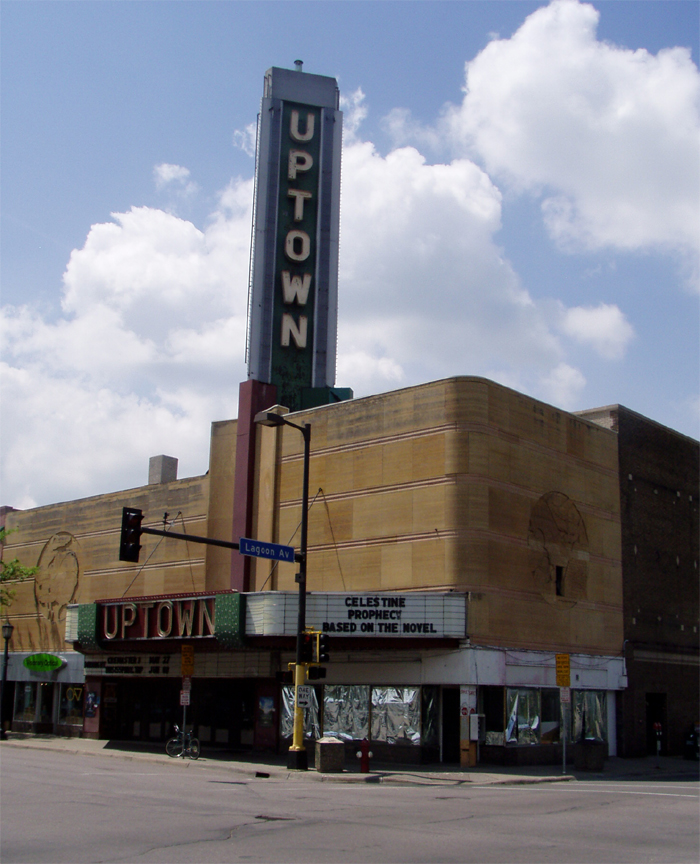
- Interactive map of Uptown Theater
- 44°56′56.55″N 93°17′55.00″W
- Location: East Isles, Minneapolis

History
- Built: 1939

Site notes
- Architect: Liebenberg and Kaplan
- Architectural style: Streamline Moderne

The Uptown Theatre is one of the oldest surviving theaters in the Twin Cities area. It was in active use from 1916 to 2020. The theater reopened on June 10, 2023 as a music and event venue.

== History ==
The theater was originally opened as the Lagoon Theater on June 3, 1916. A name change to the Uptown on April 11, 1929, coincided with the installation of sound equipment and a screening of The Dummy. A fire broke out in the ventilation system during Trade Winds on April 25, 1939, but the cinema was rebuilt soon after by the firm of Liebenberg & Kaplan.

This new Uptown Theater re-opened on November 16, 1939, with The Women. It was designed in streamline moderne, with two incised roundels on the exterior stone facade that portrayed themes of travel and adventure in cinema. Murals in the auditorium depict early explorers gazing at the future Minneapolis and the Father of the Waters presiding over water sprites that symbolize the lakes of the city.

The Uptown closed in 1975 but was purchased and re-opened by the Landmark Theatres chain in 1978. After years of classic double features, the theater began screening foreign and independent films starting with The Coca-Cola Kid in November 1985. The building was deemed a heritage site in 1990 and soon after remodeled their lobby to re-create art moderne and neo-baroque elements.

Landmark closed the theater on January 31, 2012, for renovation and upgrades. The theater re-opened September 14, 2012, showing Sleepwalk with Me. The new design added a full bar and replaced 35mm with digital projection.

The structure has a 60-foot tower that once featured a revolving beam of light marking the Uptown area of Minneapolis and could be seen for miles around. It was the first three-sided vertical tower sign in the country and had to be approved by civil aviation authorities.

The theater stands at one of the busiest intersections in the Uptown area (Hennepin-Lagoon) and has been a landmark in the area for decades. It is also one of the few cinemas in the midwest that offers balcony seating.

The Uptown screened mostly foreign and art films and ran cult films at midnight screenings. It ran The Rocky Horror Picture Show from May 19, 1978, through 1997. The film returned on a monthly basis in 2009.

The theater was known for its often clever and amusing marquees.

The theater closed in March 2020 during the COVID-19 pandemic; Landmark Theatres was evicted in June 2021 due to unpaid back rent.

The Uptown Theater was purchased by Swervo Development and it is planned to reopen as a music and event venue on May 5, 2023.

The theater's iconic sign was removed for restoration in September of 2022 and replaced with a replica on August 16, 2023.
