= Trace =

Trace may refer to:

== Arts and entertainment ==
=== Music ===
- Trace (Son Volt album), 1995
- Trace (Died Pretty album), 1993
- Trace (band), a Dutch progressive rock band
- The Trace (album), by Nell

=== Other uses in arts and entertainment ===
- Trace (magazine), British hip-hop magazine
- Trace (manhwa), a Korean internet cartoon
- Trace (manga), a Japanese manga series by Kei Koga
- Trace (TV series), a Russian crime drama
- Trace (novel), a novel by Patricia Cornwell
- The Trace (film), a 1994 Turkish film
- The Trace (video game), 2015 video game
- Sama (film), alternate title The Trace, a 1988 Tunisian film
- Trace, a fictional character in the game Metroid Prime Hunters
- Trace, the protagonist of Axiom Verge
- Trace, another name for Portgas D. Ace, a fictional character in the manga One Piece
- Trace, the main brand for a number of music channels such as Trace Urban

== Language ==
- Trace (deconstruction), a concept in Derridian deconstruction
- Trace (linguistics), a syntactic placeholder resulting from a transformation
- TRACE (psycholinguistics), a psycholinguistic model of speech perception
- Trace (semiology), the history carried by a sign
- Sign-trace, a detectable amount conceived of by Béatrice Galinon-Mélénec

== Mathematics, science, and technology ==
=== Computing and electronics ===
- TRACE, a request method in the HTTP protocol
- Traces, the equivalence classes of strings of a trace monoid, studied in trace theories of concurrent computation
- Digital traces, the traces of activities and behaviours that people leave when they interact in digital environments
- Packet trace, a timestamped sequence of packets captured on a computer network with a sniffer or similar tools
- Signal trace, a printed or etched wire on a printed circuit board
- Stack trace, report of the active steps of a computer program's execution
- Trace cache, a specialized CPU cache to speed up executable instruction fetch
- Trace table, a table used to test algorithms to ensure that no logical errors in calculation have occurred.

=== Mathematics ===
- Trace (linear algebra), the sum of the elements on the main diagonal of a square matrix or a linear transformation
  - Field trace, a particular trace in field theory
- Trace class, a certain set of operators in a Hilbert space
- Trace operator, a restriction-to-boundary operator in a Sobolev space

=== Physical sciences ===
- TRACE (Transition Region and Coronal Explorer), a NASA satellite
- Trace element, an element which composes less than 0.1% of a sample
- Trace evidence, material found at a crime scene
- Trace fossil, fossil record of biological activity
- Trace radioisotope, an element that is found in small quantities because it undergoes radioactive decay
- Seismic trace, in seismology, record of ground movement from a seismograph
- Trace (precipitation), in earth science, an amount of precipitation that falls that is too small to be measured with standard units

== Places ==
- Trace, West Virginia
- The Trace (Land Between the Lakes), a scenic roadway in Kentucky and Tennessee
- Trace Creek (Castor River), a stream in Missouri
- Trace Creek (Cub Creek), a stream in Missouri
- Trace Creek (Twelvemile Creek), a stream in Missouri
- Trace Lake, a lake in Minnesota

== Other uses ==
- Trace (name), a given name, nickname, and surname
- A synonym for trail, as in Natchez Trace
- Trace (tack), part of a draft animal's gear
- Track and trace, in goods distribution and logistics
- Trace, a type of eyeblink conditioning
- An Italian-derived synonym for star fort, in fortification
- TraceSecurity, cybersecurity company
- Trade reporting and compliance engine, a reporting system for American bond transactions
- The Trace (website), a website covering gun issues in the United States

== See also ==
- Traceability
- Tracer (disambiguation)
- Tracing (disambiguation)
- Tracking (disambiguation)
- DTrace
- Human-Trace (Ichnos-Anthropos)
