= Trace Creek =

Trace Creek may refer to the following streams in Missouri:

- Trace Creek (Castor River)
- Trace Creek (Cub Creek)
- Trace Creek (Twelvemile Creek)
