= List of Art Deco architecture in Minnesota =

This is a list of buildings that are examples of the Art Deco architectural style in Minnesota, United States.

== Ely ==
- Ely City Hall and Fire Department, Ely, 1920s
- Ely Community Center, Ely, 1938
- Ely State Theater, Ely, 1936

== Faribault ==
- Faribault Viaduct, Faribault, 1937
- Faribault Water Works, Faribault, 1933–1938
- Rice County Courthouse and Jail, Faribault, 1910 and 1934
- Thomas Scott Buckham Memorial Library, Faribault, 1930

== International Falls ==
- Alexander Baker School, International Falls, 1914
- E.W. Backus Junior High School, International Falls, 1936
- Pete Peterson Band Shell, International Falls, 1930s

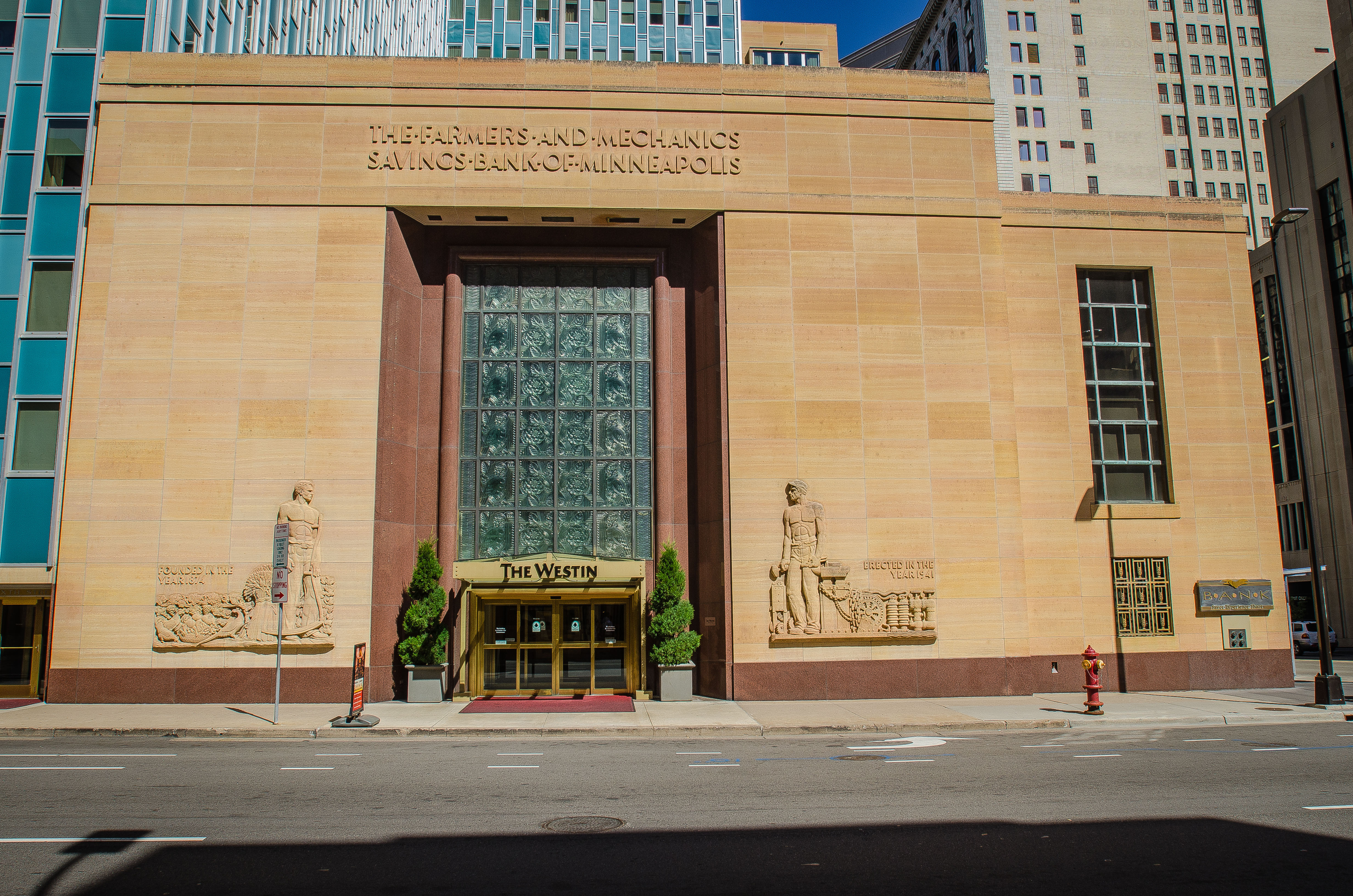
Farmers and Mechanics Savings Bank, Minneapolis

== Minneapolis ==
- Aaron and Naomi Friedell House, Minneapolis, 1940
- Avalon Theater, Minneapolis, 1924 and 1937
- Boulevard Theatre, Minneapolis, 1933
- Brede Exhibits-Plus, Minneapolis, 1940s
- Christ Church Lutheran, Minneapolis, 1948
- Cream of Wheat Building, Minneapolis, 1928
- Dwight C DeMaine, D.D.S. offices, Minneapolis, 1938
- Farmers and Mechanics Savings Bank, Minneapolis, 1942
- First Avenue, Minneapolis, 1937
- Forum Cafeteria, Minneapolis, 1914, 1930
- Foshay Tower, Minneapolis, 1929
- General Mills Laboratories, Minneapolis, 1930
- Hollywood Theater, Minneapolis, 1935
- Lumen Technologies Building (former Northwestern Bell Telephone Building), Minneapolis, 1932
- Midtown Exchange, Minneapolis, 1927
- Minneapolis Armory, Minneapolis, 1936
- Minneapolis Post Office, Minneapolis, 1933
- Minnesota Veterans Home, Minneapolis, 1911
- Modern Times Cafe (former Modern Dry Cleaner), Minneapolis
- Murray's, Minneapolis, 1946
- Oak Street Cinema, Minneapolis, 1935
- Orpheum Theatre, Minneapolis, 1921
- Parkway Theatre, Minneapolis, 1931
- Rand Tower, Minneapolis, 1929
- Riverview Theater, Minneapolis, 1948
- Midtown Exchange, Minneapolis, 1927
- Second Church of Christ Scientist, Minneapolis, 1930
- Uptown Theater, Minneapolis, 1939
- V. M. S. Kaufmann House, Minneapolis, 1936
- Washburn Park Water Tower, Minneapolis, 1931
- Wells Fargo Center, Minneapolis, 1988
- Varsity Theater, Dinkytown, Minneapolis, 1915, 1939
- Zinsmaster Apartments (former Zinsmaster Baking Company), Minneapolis

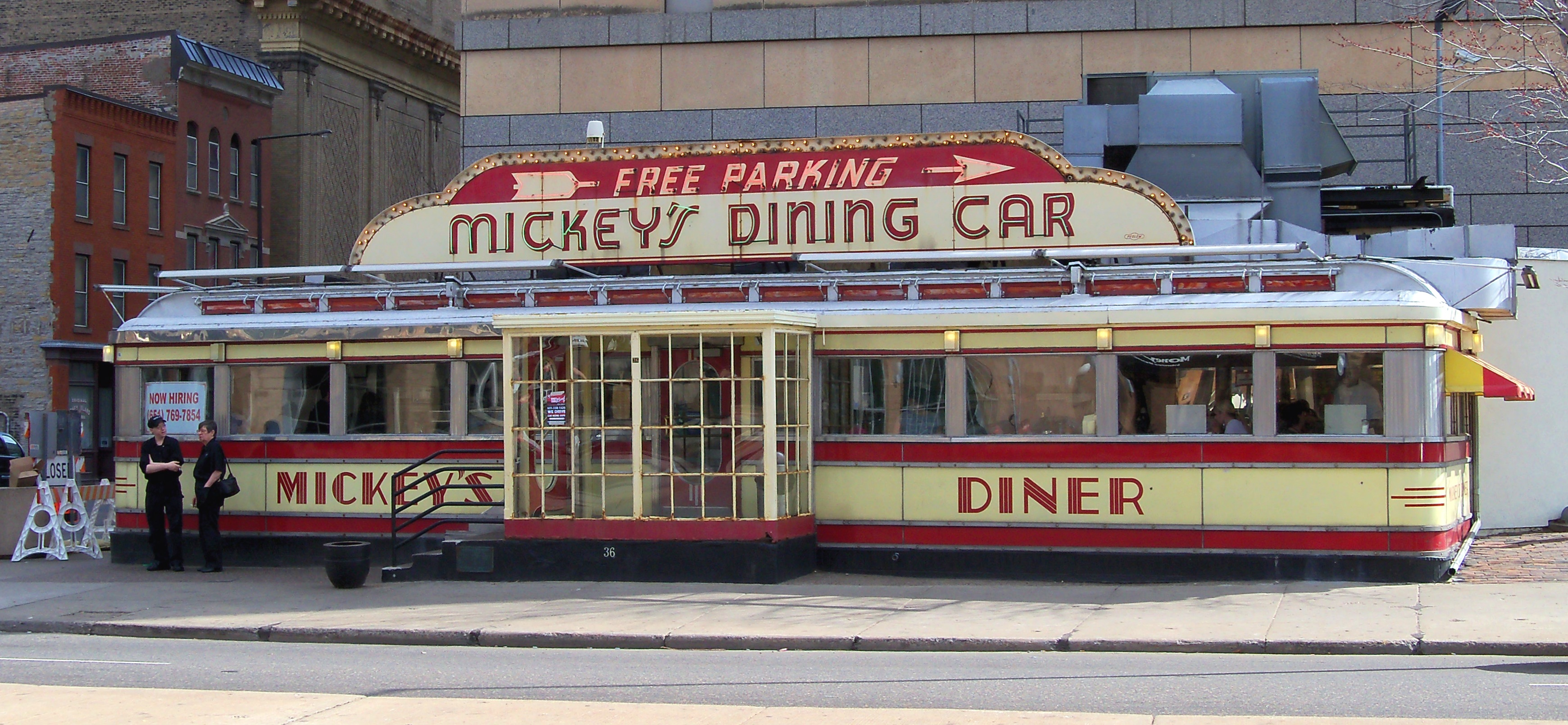
Mickey's Diner, Saint Paul

== Saint Paul ==
- Como Park Zoo and Conservatory Zoological Building, Saint Paul, 1936
- First National Bank Building, Saint Paul, 1915
- Grandview Theater, Saint Paul, 1933
- Krank Manufacturing Company building, Saint Paul, 1926
- Mickey's Diner, Saint Paul, 1937
- Minnesota Building, Saint Paul, 1929
- Minnesota Milk Company Building, Saint Paul
- Robert Street Bridge, Sant Paul, 1926
- Roy Wilkins Auditorium, Saint Paul, 1932
- Saint Paul City Hall and Ramsey County Courthouse, Saint Paul, 1932
- Saint Paul Women's City Club, Saint Paul, 1931
- United States Post Office and Customs House, Saint Paul, 1934

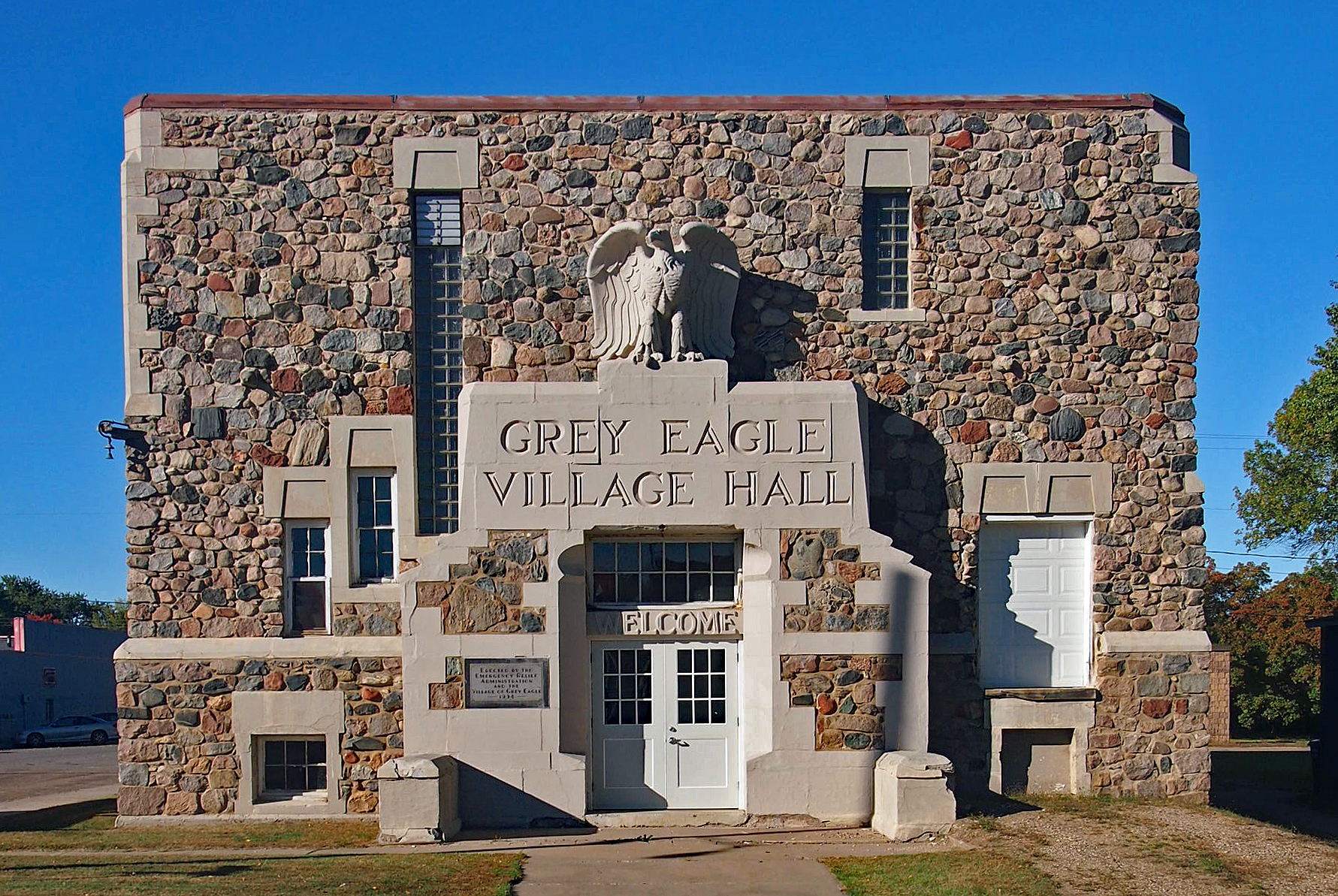
Grey Eagle Village Hall, Gray Eagle

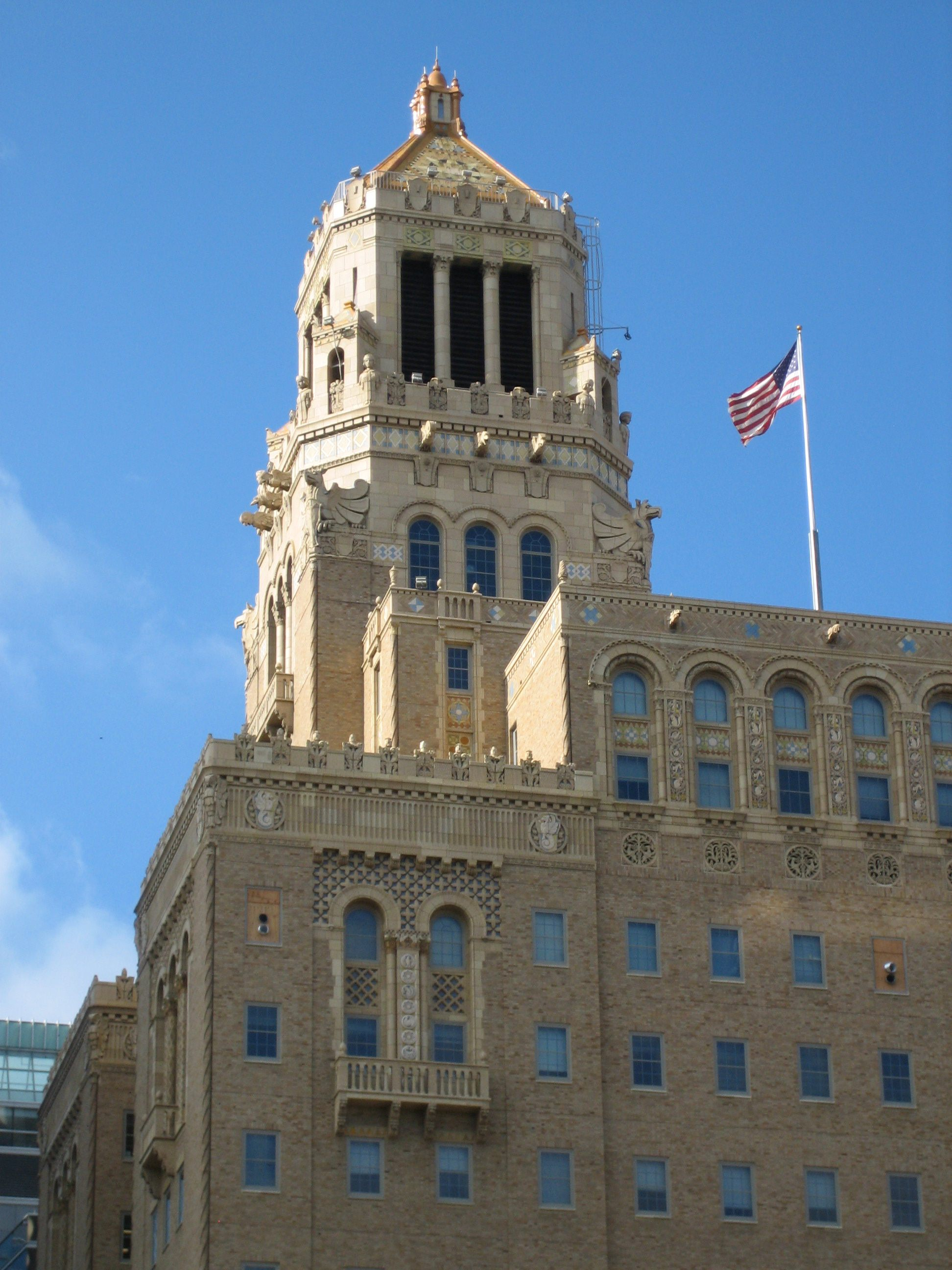
Plummer Building, Rochester

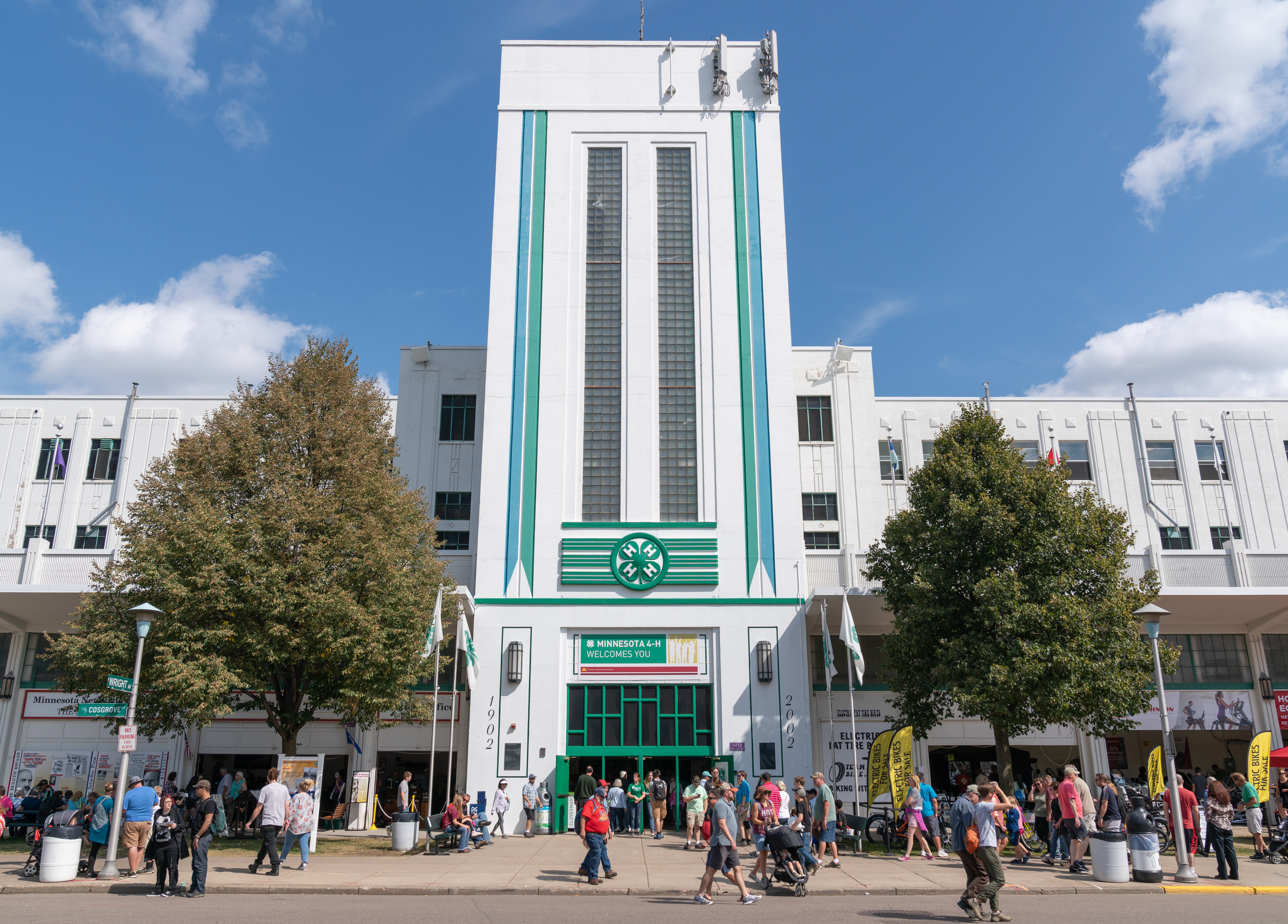
Minnesota State Fair 4-H Building, Falcon Heights

== Other cities ==
- Alworth Building, Duluth, 1910
- Bigfork Village Hall, Bigfork, 1937
- Blue Earth Post Building, Blue Earth, 1930s
- Brandon Auditorium, City Hall, and Fire Department, Brandon, 1936
- Cozy Theatre, Wadena, 1929
- David Park House, Bemidji, 1936
- Edina Theatre, 3911 West 50th Street, Edina, 1934 and 1981
- Grey Eagle Village Hall, Grey Eagle, 1934
- Hibbing Disposal Plant, Hibbing, 1939
- Hibbing Memorial Building, Hibbing, 1935
- Jefferson Elementary School, Winona, 1938
- KFAM Radio Station, St. Cloud
- Milaca Municipal Hall, Milaca, 1936
- Minnesota Music Hall of Fame, New Ulm
- Minnesota State Fair 4-H Building, Falcon Heights, 1940
- Minnesota State Fair Horticulture Building, Falcon Heights, 1947
- Municipal Building – City Hall and Fire Department, Alden, 1938
- Naniboujou Club Lodge, East Cook, 1928
- NorShor Theatre, Duluth, 1940s
- Pastime Arena (now Roller Garden), St. Louis Park, 1930
- Plummer Building, Rochester, 1927
- Red River History Museum (former school), Shelly
- Rialto Theatre, Aitkin, 1937
- Roosevelt Hall, Barrett, 1934
- United States Post Office, Marshall, 1938
- Washington–Kosciusko School, Winona, 1934
- Waverly Village Hall, Waverly, 1939
- Willmar City Auditorium, Willmar, 1938
- Willmar Municipal Airport, Willmar, 1934
- Winona City Hall, Winona, 1939
- Worthington Band Shell, Worthington, 1941

== See also ==
- List of Art Deco architecture
- List of Art Deco architecture in the United States
