= Quiet Night (album) =

Studio album by Seo Taiji
- Released: October 20, 2014
- Recorded: 2012–14
- Genre: K-pop, electropop, pop rock
- Length: 32:42
- Language: Korean
- Label: Seo Taiji Company, CJ E&M Music
- Producer: Seo Taiji

Seo Taiji chronology
Seotaiji 8th Atomos (2009)	Quiet Night (2014)

Singles from Quiet Night
- 1. "Sogyeokdong" Released: October 2, 2014 (IU ver.) October 10, 2014 (Seo Taiji ver.); 2. "Christmalo.win" Released: October 16, 2014

Quiet Night (sometimes entitled Seotaiji 9th Quiet Night) is the ninth studio album by South Korean singer-songwriter Seo Taiji, and his fifth solo studio album. It was released on October 20, 2014, by Seo Taiji Company and distributed by CJ E&M Music. The album was preceded by two singles: the collaborative song "Sogyeokdong" and the lead track "Christmalo.win". It is Seo's first full-length release after a five-year hiatus since Seotaiji 8th Atomos (2009).

Billboard magazine listed "Sogyeokdong" at number two on its list of "Best K-Pop Songs of 2014", while the album at number four on "Best K-Pop Albums of 2014".

== Background ==
On December 24, 2013, Seo posted on his official website, stating that he would be able to start recording his next studio album in early 2014, and the album would come out within the same year. Many rumors about whether the singer will release his new album floated since the beginning of this year until it was finally announced that Seo would make his comeback in October 2014.

On August 28, 2014, two months before Seo's comeback, seven screen doors in Seoul Subway Line 2 carried the following message, "We still are young. We have a decent future", excerpted from the lyrics of the song "Come Back Home" (Seo Taiji and Boys IV, 1995). According to Seo Taiji Company, Seo's agency, the artist's intention was to tell his fans who have reached their 30s and 40s that their future is still bright just like when they were younger. In other words, he wants to say that age is not the factor that divides generations.

Starting from his comeback concert "Christmalowin" held at Seoul Olympic Stadium on October 18, the artist began promoting his ninth studio album. At a news conference held in celebration of the album's release, Seo stated "The girl drawn on the album's artwork was an imaginative figure of my newborn daughter at the days when she becomes around six to seven years of age." He also stated "I put my emotions before her birth a lot in music. I hope someday mothers who have new lives inside themselves, and their children can listen to this album together."

== Singles ==
=== "Sogyeokdong" ===
"Sogyeokdong" (소격동), produced in secret collaboration with South Korean singer-songwriter IU, is a pre-release single for the album Quiet Night. It became Seo's first song ever to be pre-released online since his debut. The collaborative single featuring IU's vocals over Seo Taiji's composition, was unveiled on October 2, 2014 (by IU's record label LOEN Entertainment), while Seo's solo version was released eight days later.

The title of the track, Sogyeok-dong, Jongno-gu in Seoul, is where the singer was born and spent his early years. According to Seo's agency, the singer planned this collaboration project under the theme of a sad and beautiful story which happened in Sogyeok-dong of 1980s, from the standpoints of a woman and a man, through two different versions of songs and music videos. The '80s-themed music videos, both directed by South Korean music video director Hwang Soo-ah, featured child actors popularized through television series; Sung Yu-bin (It's Okay, That's Love) and Kim Hyun-soo (My Love from the Star). The director's cuts of the videos also were released.

The song reached numbers four (IU's version) and seventeen (Seo's version) on the Gaon Singles Chart, respectively. Without any televised promotions, IU's version won the first place on the October 19, 2014, broadcast of SBS's The Music Trend. As of 2014, "Sogyeokdong" has sold approximately 830,000 digital downloads nationally, with the sales of both versions combined.

Superstar K6 winner Kwak Jin-eon covered the song on the show's broadcast of October 24, 2014.

=== "Christmalo.win" ===
"Christmalo.win" (크리스말로윈) is the lead single from the album. The title of the song is a compound word of Christmas and Halloween, and the track came out four days prior to the album's release.

Inspired from Christmas song "Santa Claus Is Coming to Town", the single depicts modern people without division between virtue and vice, twisting stereotypical roles between Santa Claus and Halloween monsters, through the lyrics of the song, "I just got bigger and became Santa / From the cradle to the grave / I'm a slave to comfort but a sweet cake / They say I have dirty specs, cut off from the list / What do you think about my new policy that I worked on all night?" The theatrical version of its music video features child actresses Ellie (whose voice can be heard at the end of the song) and Kim Soo-hyun, and actor Shin Seung-hwan.

"Christmalo.win" peaked at number seven on the Gaon Singles Chart, and has sold about 210,000 digital downloads since its release.

== Promotion ==
Two days prior to the album's release, Seo held his comeback concert "Christmalowin" at Seoul Olympic Stadium, in support of Quiet Night. Singer IU (who collaborated with the singer in "Sogyeokdong"), child actress Ellie (who was featured in "Christmalo.win"), and rappers Swings and Vasco made guest appearance at the concert. The concert was recorded, and then aired through MBC on October 25, 2014, at 11:15 pm KST.

Upon its release, Quiet Night reached number two on the Gaon Weekly Albums Chart. The album sold more than 42,700 copies in 2014, making it the 48th best-selling Korean album of that year. It also entered Billboard's World Albums Chart on the issue date of November 8, 2014, debuting at number six.

On KBS's You Hee-yeol's Sketchbook (October 31), Seo performed the lead single and "90s ICON", alongside his previous hits "To You" (너에게; Neoege) and "Regret of the Times" (시대유감; Sidaeyugam). He also performed "Fighter of the Forest" (숲 속의 파이터; Sup sogui paiteo), alongside the singles preceding the album, on Mnet's M! Countdown (November 20).

At the end of 2014, Seo began his nationwide concert tour. Starting at the Olympic Gymnastics Arena, Olympic Park, Seoul, he performed in cities including Gwangju, Daegu, and Busan until March 1, 2015.

== Track listing ==
CD/Digital download
No.	Title	Lyrics	Music	Length
1.	"Into"		Docskim	0:53
2.	"Sogyeokdong" (소격동)	Seo Taiji	Seo Taiji	3:49
3.	"Christmalo.win" (크리스말로윈; Keuriseumallowin)	Seo Taiji	Seo Taiji	3:48
4.	"Fighter of the Forest" (숲 속의 파이터; Sup Sogui Paiteo)	Seo Taiji	Seo Taiji	3:49
5.	"Prison Break"	Seo Taiji	Seo Taiji	3:44
6.	"90s ICON"	Seo Taiji	Seo Taiji	3:49
7.	"Lost" (잃어버린; Ireobeorin)	Seo Taiji	Seo Taiji	4:23
8.	"Poignant Memories" (비록 (悲錄); Birok)	Seo Taiji	Seo Taiji	3:46
9.	"The Christmas Miracle" (성탄절의 기적; Seongtanjeolui Gijeok)	Seo Taiji	Seo Taiji	4:41
Total length:				32:42

Notes

- The album includes Seo's solo version of "Sogyeokdong".
- The title of track 8 literally means "Sad Records".

== Credits and personnel ==
Credits adapted from the liner notes of Quiet Night.

- Seo Taiji (Seo Taiji Company) – music producer, executive producer, vocals, guitar, bass guitar, keyboard, piano, programming, digital editing, recording, mixing
- Top – guitar
- Kang Jun-hyung – bass guitar
- Docskim – keyboard
- Choi Hyun-jin – drums
- Lee Kyu-jae – flute
- Ellie (Elizabeth Mize) – special vocals
- Techno T Studio – recording, mixing
- Choi Hyo-young (Suono Mastering) – mastering
  - Ko Ji-seon – mastering assistant
- Kim Dae-hong (Tada Studio) – art director, album artwork design
- Jamsan – album booklet illustration
- Yoon Yeon-jae (Tada Studio) – album artwork design

== Chart performance ==
=== Album charts ===
Chart (2014)	Peak position	Sales
South Korean Weekly Albums (Gaon)	2	KOR: 42,705
South Korean Monthly Albums (Gaon)	4	KOR: 42,705
South Korean Year-End Albums (Gaon)	49	KOR: 42,705
US World Albums Chart (Billboard)	6	KOR: 42,705

=== Charted songs ===
Title	Peak positions		Digital sales
Title	KOR Weekly	KOR Monthly	Digital sales
"Sogyeokdong" (IU version)	4	4	KOR: 636,000
"Sogyeokdong" (Seo Taiji version)	17	34	KOR: 191,000
"Christmalo.win"	7	27	KOR: 210,000
"Fighter of the Forest"	67	—	KOR: 28,000
"Poignant Memories"	73	—	KOR: 26,000
"Prison Break"	77	—	KOR: 26,000
"90s ICON"	78	—	KOR: 26,000
"Lost"	83	—	KOR: 25,000
"The Christmas Miracle"	88	—	KOR: 24,000
"Into"	95		KOR: 19,000

== Awards and nominations ==
=== Annual music awards ===
Year	Award	Category	Recipient	Result
2014	16th Mnet Asian Music Awards	UnionPay Song of the Year	"Christmalo.win"	Nominated
2014	16th Mnet Asian Music Awards	Best Band Performance	"Christmalo.win"	Nominated
2014	16th Mnet Asian Music Awards	Best Music Video	"Sogyeokdong"	Nominated
2015	29th Golden Disk Awards	Main Prize in Digital Releasing	"Sogyeokdong"	Nominated
2015	29th Golden Disk Awards	Main Prize in Album Releasing	Quiet Night	Nominated
2015	12th Korean Music Awards	Best Dance & Electronic Song	"Christmalo.win"	Nominated

=== Music program awards ===
Song	Program	Date
"Sogyeokdong" (IU ver.)	Inkigayo	October 19, 2014

== Release history ==
Region	Date	Format	Label
South Korea	October 20, 2014	CD, digital download	Seo Taiji Company, CJ E&M Music
Worldwide	October 20, 2014	Digital download	Seo Taiji Company, CJ E&M Music

== See also ==
- List of K-pop on the Billboard charts
