= Tracer =

Tracer may refer to:

== Science ==
- Flow tracer, any fluid property used to track fluid motion
- Fluorescent tracer, a substance such as 2-NBDG containing a fluorophore that is used for tracking purposes
- Histochemical tracer, a substance used for tracing purposes in histochemistry, the study of the composition of cells and tissues
- Isotopic tracer, a substance with an isotope that has been enriched to a greater level than that found in nature
- Radioactive tracer, a substance containing a radioisotope that is used for tracking purposes
- TRACER (cosmic ray detector) (Transition Radiation Array for Cosmic Energetic Radiation), a balloon-borne cosmic ray detector
- Tracers, a colloquialism for visual trailing, often experienced in connection with drug use
- TRACERS (Tandem Reconnection and Cusp Electrodynamics Reconnaissance Satellites), a pair of orbiters to study the solar wind

== Military ==
- Tracers, tracer ammunition, special bullets that burn brightly to enable the shooter to follow the bullets' trajectories
- Tactical reconnaissance and counter-concealment-enabled radar (TRACER), a radar system developed by the United States Army
- Grumman E-1 Tracer, a carrier-borne early warning aircraft used by the United States Navy in the 1960s
- Tactical Reconnaissance Armoured Combat Equipment Requirement, a joint British–American scout vehicle

== Arts and entertainment ==
=== Music ===
- Tracer (band), an Australian rock band
- Tracer (album), a 2012 album by Teengirl Fantasy
- "Tracers", song by Ash (band) from A-Z, Vol.1 2010
- "Tracers", song by Miracle Fortress from Was I the Wave? 2011
- "Tracers", song by Trans-Siberian Orchestra from Night Castle 2009

=== Films ===
- Tracer (film), a 2016 Vietnamese film
- Tracers (film), a 2015 American film

=== Video games ===
- Tracer (video game), a 1995 action-puzzle video game
- Tracer, a 1976 Sega arcade video game
- Tracer, leader of the Eliminators in The Warriors
- Tracer (Overwatch), a player character from the video games Overwatch and Heroes of the Storm
- Tracer Tong, a character from the video game series Deus Ex

=== Comics and comic strips ===
- Tracer (DC Comics), a DC Comics character
- Tracer (Marvel Comics), a Marvel Comics supervillain
- Tracer Bullet, one of Calvin's alter egos in Calvin and Hobbes

=== Television ===
- Tracer (TV series), a 2022 South Korean television series

== Transportation ==
- Mercury Tracer, an automobile
- Tracer (bus), the bus system for Tracy, California
- Yamaha Tracer 900
- Yamaha Tracer 700
- MonoTracer
- Zerotracer
- E-Tracer and X-Tracer by Peraves

== See also ==
- Trace (disambiguation)
- Tracing (disambiguation)
- Tracer Bullet (disambiguation)
- Tracery, an architectural device by which windows are divided into sections
- Traceur, a parkour practitioner
