= Jang-mi =

- Hangul: 장미
- RR: Jangmi
- MR: Changmi

Jang-mi is a Korean given name.

People with this name include:

- Kim Jang-mi (born 1992), South Korean sport shooter
- Lee Jang-mi (born 1994), South Korean badminton player

Fictional characters with this name include:

- Jang-mi (Rose), in 2007 South Korean webcomic Trace
- Baek Jang-mi, in 2008 South Korean film Open City
- Kim Jang-mi, in 2011 South Korean film Sunny
- Jang-mi, in 2014 South Korean film Man on High Heels
- Joo Jang-mi, in 2014 South Korean television series Marriage, Not Dating
- Baek Jang-mi, in 2014 South Korean television series Run, Jang-mi

== See also ==
- List of Korean given names
- Jangmi
