= Satellite tracker =

Satellite tracker or satellite tracking may refer to:

- GPS tracking unit, that uses satellite navigation
- Satellite watching, hobby of tracking artificial satellites
- Satellite tracking (animal migration), tracking of animal migration using satellites
- Satellite tracking station
- Geodetic satellite tracking
- Satellite orbit determination

== See also ==
- Space_debris#Tracking_and_measurement
- Tracker (disambiguation)
