= Tracking =

Tracking may refer to:

== Science and technology ==
=== Computing ===
- Tracking, in computer graphics, in match moving (insertion of graphics into footage)
- Tracking, composing music with music tracker software
- Eye tracking, measuring the position of the eye relative to the head
- Finger tracking, measuring the positions of the fingers
- Optical motion tracking, or motion capture, recording the precise movements of objects or people
- Position tracking, monitoring the location of a mechanical system in real-time by counting pulses; see Incremental encoder § Position tracking
- Positional tracking, an essential component of augmented reality
- Video tracking, locating an object in each frame of a video sequence
- Mobile phone tracking, monitoring the physical location of a mobile phone
- Internet tracking, analyzing online activity
- Web visitor tracking, the analysis of visitor behavior on a website
- Sleep tracking, monitoring sleeping experience (deep, REM, duration etc.)

=== Life sciences ===
- Animal migration tracking, performed by attaching a tag to an animal
- GPS animal tracking, to learn about the ecology of an area
- Environmental tracking, a concept developed by the Environmental Investment Organisation to monitor climate change

=== Logistics ===
- Tracking (commercial airline flight), the means of tracking civil airline flights in real time
- Package tracking, or package logging, the process of localizing shipping containers, mail and parcel post
- Track and trace, a process of determining the current and past locations and other status of property in transit
- Asset tracking, which provides status of objects of an inventory or mobile stock
- Vehicle tracking system uses GPS to find out about movement and/or location of cars, trucks, and/or other vehicles

=== Other uses in science and technology ===
- Tracking (particle physics), measuring the direction and magnitude of the momenta of charged particles
- Tracking, a process of degradation in which tree-like carbonized patterns (electrical treeing) appear on an insulator
- Directional stability, the tendency of a vehicle (typically referring to a watercraft) to keep its orientation aligned with its direction of movement
- Toe (automotive), the symmetric angle that each wheel makes with the long axis of a vehicle
- Video tape tracking, alignment of the magnetic tape of a video recorder with the read head
- Tracking, combining individual radar detections with a radar tracker
- Tracking system, various methods used to monitor moving persons or objects, often remotely
- Tracking transmitter, a device that broadcasts a radio signal that can be detected by a directional antenna
- Target and missile tracking, elements of Go-Onto-Target systems in missile guidance
- Tracking is also used, euphemistically, for surveillance or mass surveillance
- Multitrack recording, a term commonly shortened to "tracking"

== Arts and entertainment ==
- Tracking (documentary), a 1994 documentary about the band Phish
- Tracking (novel), a three-part work by David R. Palmer
- Tracking shot, a filming technique also known as a dolly shot

== Sports ==
- Tracking (dog), the act of a dog following a scent trail
- Tracking (freeflying), in skydiving, the technique of moving horizontally while in freefall
- Tracking (hunting), the art of learning about a place via animal trails and other environmental evidence
- Tracking trial, a dog competition

== Other uses ==
- Tracking (education), separating children into classes according to academic ability
- Tracking (scouting), a scouting activity focused on observation, stalking, and following a trail
- Tracking, typographers' term for letter-spacing, uniformly increasing or decreasing the space between all letters in a block of text
- Tracking, matching or comparing the performance of a financial portfolio to a stock market index

== See also ==
- Trace (disambiguation)
- Tracing (disambiguation)
- Track (disambiguation)
- Tracker (disambiguation)
- Tracking software (disambiguation)
