= Pia (band) =

South Korean rock band

- Pia's 2011 promotional shot for Pentagram

Background information
- Origin: Busan, South Korea
- Genres: Nu metal; alternative rock; alternative metal; post-grunge; emo; electronic rock; hardcore punk (early)
- Years active: 1998–2019
- Labels: Ludi Company (2001); Goesoo Indiegene (2002–2009); WinOne Entertainment (2011–2016); REALIVE (2016–present)
- Members: Yohan (vocal); Hullang (guitar); Ki-Bum (bass); SimZ (piano & fx); Hyeseung (drums)

Pia (Korean: 피아) was a South Korean rock band formed in Busan in 1998. Meaning 'the Universe and I' or 'You and I' in Chinese characters (Pi:彼 A:我), Pia was originally formed by Hullang Lee (guitar), Kibum Kim (bass) and Yohan Ok (lead singer) who were later joined by Simz No (fx, keyboard) and, after several member changes on drums, Hye Seung Yang (drums). The band has maintained this line-up ever since their first official gig together, the 2001 Ssamzie Festival.

After touring in local clubs and rock festivals for a few years, they relocated to Seoul and released their debut album Pia@ArrogantEmpire.xxx in March 2001. Having gradually gained momentum, the band made a breakthrough at the 2002 ETP FEST and eventually signed to Goesoo Indiegene, a major label established by Seo Taiji, one of Korea's most prominent musicians. After releasing three studio albums 3rd Phase (2003), Become Clear (2005), Waterfalls (2007) and an EP Urban Explorer (2008) through Goesoo, Pia left the label in 2009 and joined WinWon Entertainment in 2011, releasing their fifth studio album Pentagram that year.

While Pia originally began as a nu metal/hardcore band recognized for their heavy guitar sound and Yohan's powerful screaming vocals, their musical style has changed significantly over the years. Having explored various genres such as alternative metal, emo core, garage rock, alternative rock, synthpop, and such, their current music is considered to be alternative rock and electronic rock. While their albums have generally become softer and more melodic with increasing electronic influences, Pia has consistently incorporated their original heavy and powerful sound to their evolving style.

== History ==
=== Formation, name, and early years (~2001) ===
Lead singer Yohan and guitarist Hullang met while Yohan was in a death metal band called "Sleep in Pain" and Hullang in "C.O.B." as one of Busan's most prospective thrash metal guitarists. The two bands had been in a sort of rivalry when they met at a concert after-party through mutual friends, a Korean metal band named "Rainy Sun", and the two began a close friendship since. During his mandatory military service, Yohan met Kibum who had played the guitar in college bands and became acquaintances. In 1998 after their military services, Yohan and Hullang gathered to form the band Pia, and after searching for a bassist, they recruited Kibum who had changed to bass to play in the military band.

The name "Pia", which is formed of two Chinese characters Pi(彼), meaning 'you', and A(我), meaning 'I', comes from the name of bands soldiers wear to identify friends from foes (피아식별띠). Yohan took notice of this during his service and decided to name the band Pia, with a motto of "the world consists of friends or foes." This original, somewhat aggressive meaning of the band name gradually softened, along with their music style, to mean 'you and I', and thus the universe.

After recruiting drummer Min Yong Shin, Pia began touring clubs and rock festivals all over the nation, and in 1999 they participated in Indie Power 1999, a compilation album of several then popular underground bands covering hit songs. In August that year, they entered the 2nd MBC Rock Festival in Busan and won the grand prize for their song "Oil Lump" which was later included in their first album.

In 2000, Pia relocated to Seoul to record their first studio album, and recruited Simz for turntables and sampling and replaced drummer Shin with Da Hee Kang. While recording demos and spreading sample CDs, Pia actively performed live and again participated in Indie Power 2001. During this time, Pia's music was heavily influenced by the heavy metal, hardcore, and nu metal scene and bands such as Korn, Slipknot, Pantera, and Limp Bizkit, and this continued to their first studio album Pia@ArrogantEmpire.xxx.

=== Pia@ArrogantEmpire.xxx and Goesoo Indigene ===
On March 22, 2001, Pia released their debut album titled Pia@ArrogantEmpire.xxx through Rock Korea and was a success among critics and fans alike. The band spent around a year making this album with Heung-Chan Ahn from the South Korean thrash metal band Crash as their producer. Ahn utilized the methods he learnt from Colin Richardson to produce a quality sound uncommon in Korea at that time. Many praise this album for its sharp yet thick sound and Yohan's aggressive, rage-filled screaming and growling vocals. The lyrics convey a sense of alienation, despair, rage, and cynicism that comes from our daily lives.

Pia toured in various clubs and festivals to promote the album, including the 2001 Ssamzie Festival. The band has revealed that they feel embarrassed when looking at their live gigs from these days because while their energy and vibe is incomparable, their actual performances were horrible. However, Seo Taiji took notice of their performance from Ssamzie and selected Pia to play at the 2002 ETP Festival alongside artists such as hyde, Tommy Lee and Seo Taiji himself. At the end of the same year they signed their first major label record deal with Seotaiji Company.

After the deal was announced, many criticized the band for selling out and worried the band would compromise their signature heavy dark sound to fit the public's taste. To add on, despite a major label debut, the general unpopularity of the K-rock scene put Pia in an ambiguous stance, as although they were officially a major label band they were still largely unknown to the public similar to underground bands. This would be the motif of their second album title, "3rd Phase".

=== "3rd Phase" ===
Their second album "3rd Phase" was their first album after they signed with Seotaiji Company, and was very much anticipated by fans who were curious of how their sound would progress or change. The sound in this album is less heavier and more melodic, with a wider range of style than their previous album. Some fans were disappointed by this change and accused Seotaiji for steering Pia into becoming a public-friendly band. However, the album was self-produced with only minor influence from Seotaiji who mostly assisted the technical aspect of the sound. Pia has also mentioned several times that their music style choices were never based on popularity but on the music they like and are inspired at that time while making the album. Only one single was released from this album, "Gloomy Sunday", which received a fair amount of airplay.

It was from this point that Pia emphasized their wish to communicate with fans and audiences through their live shows. The band's name "Pia", which originally means friends or foes, was softened to mean 'You and I', and thus 'Us'. The group also began gaining some international fame. After performing at several of their own concerts, Pia performed with Linkin Park in October, and Limp Bizkit in December 2003. In May 2004, Pia joined Seo Taiji in Vladivostok, Russia and spread Korea rock music to Russian rock fans. The following month, the group joined Linkin Park on a tour of Hong Kong and Singapore. Although they were requested by Linkin Park to open for their American tour as well, due to visa problems regarding the military service of some of the members, Pia was not able to join the tour.

== Band members ==
- Yohan (요한) : Vocal
- Hullang (헐랭) : Guitar
- Ki-Bum (기범) : Bass
- SimZ (심지) : F.X (effects – Turntables, Samples, Keyboard, etc.)
- Hyeseung (혜승) : Drum

== Discography ==
=== Studio albums ===
Year	Details
2001	Pia@Arrogantempire.xxx: Release: March 22, 2001; Label: Ludi, 5&Company; Formats: CD
2003	3rd Phase: Release: August 8, 2003; Label: Goesoo Indegene, Yedang; Formats: CD
2005	Become Clear: Release: May 31, 2005; Label: Goesoo Indegene, MTrack, Yedang; Formats: CD
2007	Waterfalls: Release: June 14, 2007; Label: Goesoo Indegene, Spotlight, Yedang; Formats: CD
2011	Pentagram: Release: September 6, 2011; Label: WinOne, Danal; Formats: CD, Download
2015	Pia: Release: April 7, 2015; Label: WinOne, Mirrorball Music; Formats: CD, Download
2017	Pia 15 Years Album: Release: February 2, 2017; Label: C9 Entertainment, Mirrorball Music; Formats: CD, Download

=== EP ===
Year	Details
2008	Urban Explorer: Release: July 17, 2008; Label: Goesoo Indegene, Spotlight, Yedang; Formats: CD
2012	St. Lilac: Release: April 25, 2012; Label: WinOne, Danal; Formats: Download

=== Singles ===
- "We Never Go Alone (Fight Song for Park JiSung)" (2010.05.17, Music Pia/Imperial)
- "Sonyeon" (소년, "Boy") (2011.07.28, WinOne/Danal)
- "B.E.C.K." (2011.08.18, WinOne/Danal)
- "From This Black Day" (2012.07.23, WinOne/Danal)
- "Korean Anthem" (with Kim Jang Hoon) (2012.07.27, Concert World/LOEN)
- "Oasis" (오아시스) (with ZICO of Block B) (2012.09.17, WinOne/LOEN)
- "Make My Day" (2012.12.05, WinOne/Danal)
- "Nae Bom Eulo" (내 봄으로, "About My Spring") (2013.03.19, WinOne/LOEN)
- "Don't Go" (2013.05.30, Forest Media/Pony Canyon)
- "O" (2013.06.27, WinOne/LOEN)
- "Storm Is Coming" (2015.03.24, WinOne Entertainment/Mirrorball Music)
- "Kuz (Re-Recording)" (October 28, 2015, KongG Music)
- "SHINE" (June 16, 2016, Mirrorball Music)
- "Jaoseon" (내 자오선, "The Meridian") (July 21, 2016, Mirrorball Music)
- "Midnight Run" (July 26, 2016, CJ E&M)
- "Storm Is Coming (1Piece Mix)" (January 25, 2017, Mirrorball Music)

=== Guest appearances ===
Year	Band	Album	Song
2001	All Lies Band	First Album	"Mwol Jjaeryeoboni" (뭘 째려보니, "What Looked Eyeballing")
2006	Hollow Jan	Rough Draft In Progress	"Tragic Flaw"
2009	Hwantastic Friends	Lee Seung Hwan 20th Anniversary Album	"Bulgeun Nakta" (붉은 낙타, "Red Camel") (feat. Pia, JP, Yoon Do Hyun, Lee Sung Woo)
2010	Outsider	Hero	"Rolleokoseuteo" (롤러코스터, "Rollercoaster") (feat. Yohan of Pia)

=== Compilation appearances ===
Year	Album	Song	Label
1999	Fandom Vol.5	"All"	Fandom
1999	Indie Power 1999	"Jalmotdoen Mannam" (잘못된 만남, "Wrongful Meeting") (Kim Gun-mo cover)	Rock Records
2000	먼나라 이웃나라! Rockstar Alive	"참을 수 없는", "Suyoil" (수요일, "Wednesday")	Attic
2001	Indie Power 2001 (인디파워 2001)	"Malhaejwo" (말해줘; "Tell Me") (Jinusean cover)	Rock Records
2001	Hard Core 2001	"Intro" (Hard Core 2001 Project Band), "Stop" (Hard Core 2001 Project Band), "Triangle"	Pony Canyon Korea
2001	2001 Ssamzie Sound Festival	"Wonsungi" (원숭이; "Monkey")	55am
2006	Reds Go Together	"Red Devils"	SMC
2010	DJMAX ROCK Tunes	"Become Myself"	Pentavision
2012	Immortal Songs 2 Legends Sing Lee Seung Hwan (불후의 명곡2 - 전설을 노래하다 (이승환편))	"Red Camel" (붉은 낙타)	Loen Entertainment
2012	Top Band Survival 2 Round of 16 Group B (서바이벌 TOP밴드2 16강-B)	"Beat It" (Michael Jackson cover)	KBS Media
2012	Top Band Survival 2 Round of 8 Group B (서바이벌 TOP밴드2 8강-B)	"Gitaro Otobaireul Taja" (기타로 오토바이를 타자, "Motorcycle Guitar Ride") (Sanulrim cover)	KBS Media
2012	Top Band Survival 2 Round of 8 Group B Live (서바이벌 TOP밴드2 8강 생방송-B)	"Urteuramaen" (울트라맨이야, "Ultramania") (Seo Taiji cover)	KBS Media
2012	Top Band Survival 2 Round of 4 (서바이벌 TOP밴드2 4강)	"Pipe Boy" (feat. Jayswing)	KBS Media
2012	Top Band Survival 2 Finals (서바이벌 TOP밴드2 결승)	"Black Or White" (feat. Jayswing) (Michael Jackson cover), "Where I [m]" (feat. Jayswing)	KBS Media
2015	Indi 20junyeon Ginyeom Aelbeom (인디 20주년 기념 앨범, Pt. 4, Indie 20th Anniversary Album, Pt. 4)	"Fairytale"	MOSTfit
2016	F.ound Tracks Vol.73	"Jaoseon" (내 자오선, "The Meridian")	Mirrorball Music

=== Soundtrack appearances ===
Year	Film	Song
2004	Spin Kick	"Ego" (featuring 전인권)
2011	My Princess	"U.F.O." (Ok Yohan of Pia)
2012	Golden Time	"Oasis" (featuring ZICO of Block B)
2013	26 Years	"Kkot" (꽃, "Flower") (Various Artists)
2013	Man In Love	"Don't Go"
2016	Let's Fight Ghost	"Midnight Run"

=== Video game appearances ===
Year	Game	Song	Platform
2007	Pump It Up NX 2	"Soyongdoli" (소용돌이; "A Maelstrom")	Arcade
2010	DJMAX Portable 3	"Become Myself", "Keys to the World" (vocals and lyrics by Yohan)	PlayStation Portable
2011	DJMAX Technika 3	"Out of CTRL" (vocals and lyrics by Yohan)	Arcade
2012	Ma Gye Chon	"From This Black Day"	

== Videography ==
- "Stop" (2001)
- "Gloomy Sunday" (2003)
- "Where I [m]" (2003)
- "My Bed" (2005)
- "Cassandra" (2005)
- "Black Fish Swim" (2007)
- "The Oracle" (Fan Artwork Music Video)
- "Yes You Are" (Alex Wonsuk Choi version) (2011)
- "Yes You Are" (Rotta version) (2011)
- "From This Black Day" (2012)
- "Oasis" (2012)
- "Flower" (2013)
- "Don't Go" (2013)
- "O" (2013)
- "백색의 샤 (Shah The White)" (2015)
- "Shine" (2016)
- "Storm Is Coming (1Piece Mix)" (2017)

== Awards ==
Year	Award-Giving Body	Category	Work	Result
2007	Mnet Asian Music Awards	Best Rock Performance	"Black Fish Swim"	Nominated
