= Tracer Bullet =

Tracer Bullet or tracer bullet may refer to:

- Tracer ammunition, bullets that are built with a small pyrotechnic charge in their base
- Tracer Bullet, a fictional detective, alter ego of Calvin in the comic strip Calvin and Hobbes
- A term used in Scrum (software development) to describe a proof-of-concept deliverable
- Pathfinder (library science) - a term for those pathfinders produced by the Library of Congress.

== See also ==
- Tracer (disambiguation)
- Bullet (disambiguation)
