= Jangmi =

Jangmi may refer to:

- Jang-mi, a Korean name
- List of storms named Jangmi
- Romanization of the Korean word for rose
