= Tactical reconnaissance and counter-concealment-enabled radar =

US Army radar system

The United States Army tactical reconnaissance and counter-concealment-enabled radar – TRACER is a mid-range, long wavelength synthetic aperture radar (SAR) system that provides all-weather persistent surveillance developed by the United States Army Communications-Electronics Research, Development and Engineering Center's Intelligence and Information Warfare Directorate. The TRACER program began in April 2007 and has been integrated onto a C-12 Huron. In the fall of 2010, it is planned to test TRACER on NASA's unmanned Predator-B IKHANA, and later on Air Warrior.

Due to its decreased size, weight and power consumption compared to the predecessor foliage-penetrating radar program, or FOPEN which has been in the field since the late-90s, TRACER operates on manned and unmanned platforms and produces images on board in less than five minutes. As a follow-on to FOPEN, the TRACER system can be tailored to specific missions by providing a variety of SAR images including strip maps and spotlight and circle images.
