= United States Army Command, Control, Communication, Computers, Cyber, Intelligence, Surveillance and Reconnaissance Center =

Coordinates: 40.038119°N 74.588275°W

Combat Capabilities Development Command C5ISR Center
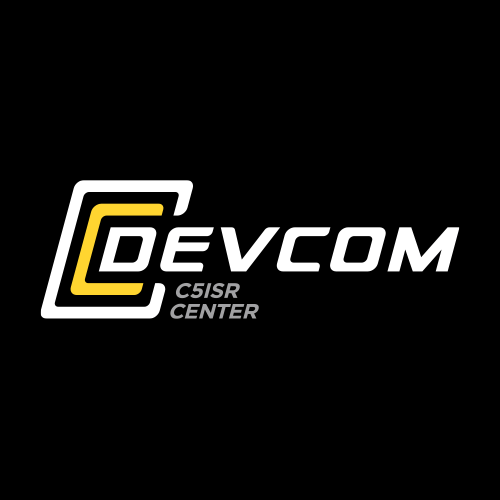
- C5ISR Center logo
- Country: United States
- Branch: U.S. Army
- Type: Research and Development
- Garrison/HQ: Aberdeen Proving Ground, Maryland
- Motto: Technology driven. Warfighter focused.
- Website: c5isrcenter.devcom.army.mil

Commanders
- Director: Ms. Elizabeth Ferry

The Combat Capabilities Development Command (CCDC) C5ISR Center, formerly the Communications-Electronics RD&E Center (CERDEC), is the United States Army information technologies and integrated systems center. CCDC C5ISR Center is headquartered at Aberdeen Proving Ground in Maryland, with activities at Fort Belvoir in Virginia and Joint Base McGuire-Dix-Lakehurst in New Jersey.

As one of the 10 organizations that make up the Combat Capabilities Development Command, a subordinate organization of the Army Futures Command, CCDC C5ISR Centers supplies Command, Control, Communications, Computers, Cyber, Intelligence, Surveillance and Reconnaissance (C5ISR) capabilities, technologies and integrated solutions for the Soldier.

== Core competencies ==
CCDC C5ISR Center's six directorates and Product Director (PD) aim to integrate C5ISR technologies in order to provide systems-of-systems products for soldiers.

"C5ISR" is the ability to direct, coordinate and control the assets necessary for accomplishing the mission and reporting battlefield situations and activities. CCDC C5ISR Center develops new technologies, and adapts technologies from other Army R&D centers and laboratories, Department of Defense partners, government and national laboratories, academia and industry. Additionally, the group provides products to other system developers (for platform integration).

The group utilizes Modeling and Simulation (M&S) capabilities to provide the Army and Joint Forces, system of systems assessments of C5ISR technologies and concepts. CCDC C5ISR Center's product manager for C5ISR On-the-Move assesses the effectiveness of inserting new technologies into an operationally relevant environment. CCDC C5ISR Center collaborates with Army, DoD and other stakeholders to provide C5ISR models, simulated architectures and automated tools in support of requirement definition, design and engineering, manufacturing, and test and evaluation.

== Directorates ==
CCDC C5ISR Center is subdivided into several directorates, each focusing on an area or discipline:

- Command Power and Integration Directorate (CP&ID): CP&ID aims to enable the quick transition of optimum capabilities to soldiers in support of ongoing operations. CP&I aims to develop, acquire, manage and apply technological expertise in information and knowledge management; portable and mobile power; platform integration and prototyping; environmental control systems; and position, navigation and timing.
- Intelligence and Information Warfare Directorate (I2WD or I²WD) aims to provide effective intelligence and information warfare tools that equip US soldiers with integrated systems needed to ensure information dominance, and focuses on quick-reaction capabilities, which consist of transitioning new technologies into systems for rapid deployment in the field. This includes radar/combat identification; electronic warfare air/ground survivability equipment; information and network operations; signals intelligence (SIGINT); modeling and simulation; information fusion; measurement and signatures intelligence (MASINT); electronic warfare countermeasures; and intelligence dissemination. Additionally, I2WD provides engineering and management support to PEOs throughout the lifecycle of these systems.
- Night Vision and Electronic Sensors Directorate (NVESD) develops electro-optical electronic sensors, including thermal imagers, image intensifiers and lasers, to equip soldiers with imaging devices that aim to improve surveillance and targeting, safety, and lethality while providing increased capability for soldiers, ground/Airborne electro optics/infrared, force protection, and IED/mine and minefield detection.
- Product Realization Directorate (PRD) provides expertise in the areas of production engineering; manufacturing technology; maintenance concept engineering; quality assurance and continuous improvement; special manufacturing and quality assessment; reliability and risk assessment; industrial base technical advocacy and management; configuration management; technical data; specifications and standardization program management; technical project leadership; and technology acquisition planning and preparation for the Army communications-electronics community of practice. PRD influences design and system support during all phases of the product lifecycle, assisting in program synchronization, availability, improvement, fielding, delivery and sustainment of technology for the Warfighter.
- Space and Terrestrial Communications Directorate (S&TCD) aims to provide soldiers with adaptive, reliable battlefield communications with electronic counter-countermeasure capabilities and information security (INFOSEC). S&TCD performs research, development and engineering functions in terrestrial, avionics and space-dependent communications technology.
- Software Engineering Directorate (SED) provides software acquisition support and software engineering support to Army tactical systems throughout the systems' lifecycles, including concept and development, systems development and demonstration, production and deployment, and operations and maintenance. SED conceptualizes, develops and supports the fielding and sustaining of systems and software products, services and technologies that enhance Army, Joint and Coalition Force's war fighting capabilities. SED helps ensure America's Warfighters and Allies are equipped to defend the homeland and own the decisive edge throughout the battlespace.
- Product Director C4ISR and Network Modernization (PD C4ISR & NetMod) is an Army capital investment that provides a “test/assess-analyze-fix” environment that evaluates technical applications and maturity for emerging networking, sensors and C4ISR-enabling platforms on a year-round basis. Activities conducted at PD C4ISR & NetMod's laboratories or field sites are constructed as opportunities to expose systems to conditions not ordinarily available within their development environments. PD C4ISR & NetMod's integrated capabilities events inform the Army and joint communities on the capabilities of emerging technology. (NO LONGER EXISTS)

== Developed systems and projects ==
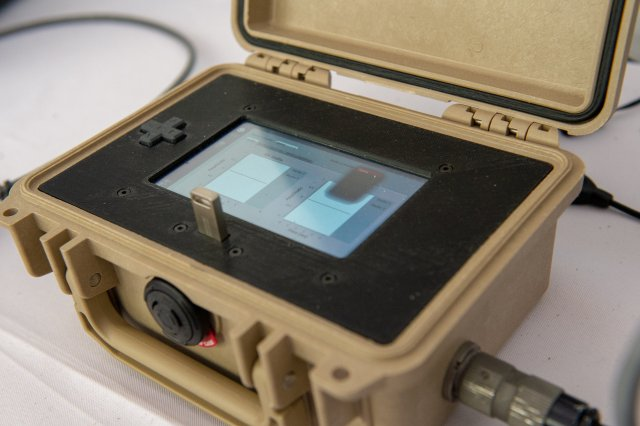
The Radio Interoperability Capability-Universal, or RIC-U, serves as an analog-to-digital voice bridging device between allies and U.S. troops. Communications are encrypted.

- TRACER is a mid-range, long wavelength synthetic aperture radar system that provides all-weather persistent surveillance.
- Rucksack Enhanced Portable Power System (REPPS) is a solar backpack system capable of recharging batteries and/or acting as a continuous power source. It combines anti-glint solar panels and interchangeable connectors and adaptors for increased charging options.
- Multi-Access Cellular Extension (MACE): The United States Army is adapting commercial wireless technologies to operate with military networks, expanding the range of available devices and applications. It has initiated a project, Multi-Access Cellular Extension (MACE) in the commercial marketplace. MACE is intended to unify commercial technologies with military needs. The developers of MACE contend that it will support cellular communications over smart phones as well as links through cellular base stations to tactical systems. In demonstration pilots, mesh networking is to be used to test seamless operation in WiFi/cellular environments even when a cellular base station is not available.
- Radio Interoperability Capability-Universal (RIC-U) is an analog-to-digital voice bridge between allies and U.S. troops. After plugging in the RIC-U, Soldiers select the radio they wish to speak on. They then interoperate with the allies' radio voice networks, transmitting and receiving voice messages. Allied partners can use their native radio communications equipment, unique encryption, and frequency-hopping techniques to speak with U.S. military personnel. These communications are encrypted.
