= Tracing =

Tracing may refer to:

== Computer graphics ==
- Image tracing, digital image processing to convert raster graphics into vector graphics
- Path tracing, a method of rendering images of three-dimensional scenes such that the global illumination is faithful to reality
- Ray tracing (graphics), techniques in computer graphics
- Boundary tracing (also known as contour tracing), a segmentation technique that identifies the boundary pixels of the digital region

== Software engineering ==
- Tracing (software), a method of debugging in computer programming
- System monitoring
- Application performance management

== Physics ==
- Ray tracing (physics), a method for calculating the path of waves or particles
- Dye tracing, tracking various flows using dye added to the liquid in question

== Other uses ==
- Tracing (art), copying an object or drawing, especially with the use of translucent tracing paper
- Tracing (criminology), determining crime scene activity from trace evidence left at crime scenes
- Tracing (law), a legal process by which a claimant demonstrates what has happened to their property
- Anterograde tracing, and Retrograde tracing, biological research techniques used to map the connections of neurons
- Call tracing, a procedure that permits an entitled user to be informed about the routing of data for an established connection
- Curve sketching, a process for determining the shape of a geometric curve
- Family Tracing and Reunification, a process whereby disaster response teams locate separated family members
- Process tracing, a qualitative research method
- Tracking and tracing, a process of monitoring the location and status of property in transit
- Curve tracing, a method for analyzing the characteristics of semiconductors; see Semiconductor curve tracer
- Tracing (as with a gun or camera), tracking an object, as with the use of tracer ammunition
- Contact tracing, finding and identifying people in contact with someone with an infectious disease

== See also ==
- Trace (disambiguation)
- Tracer (disambiguation)
- Tracking (disambiguation)
