= Grey Eagle, Minnesota =

City in Minnesota, United States

Grey Eagle
- City
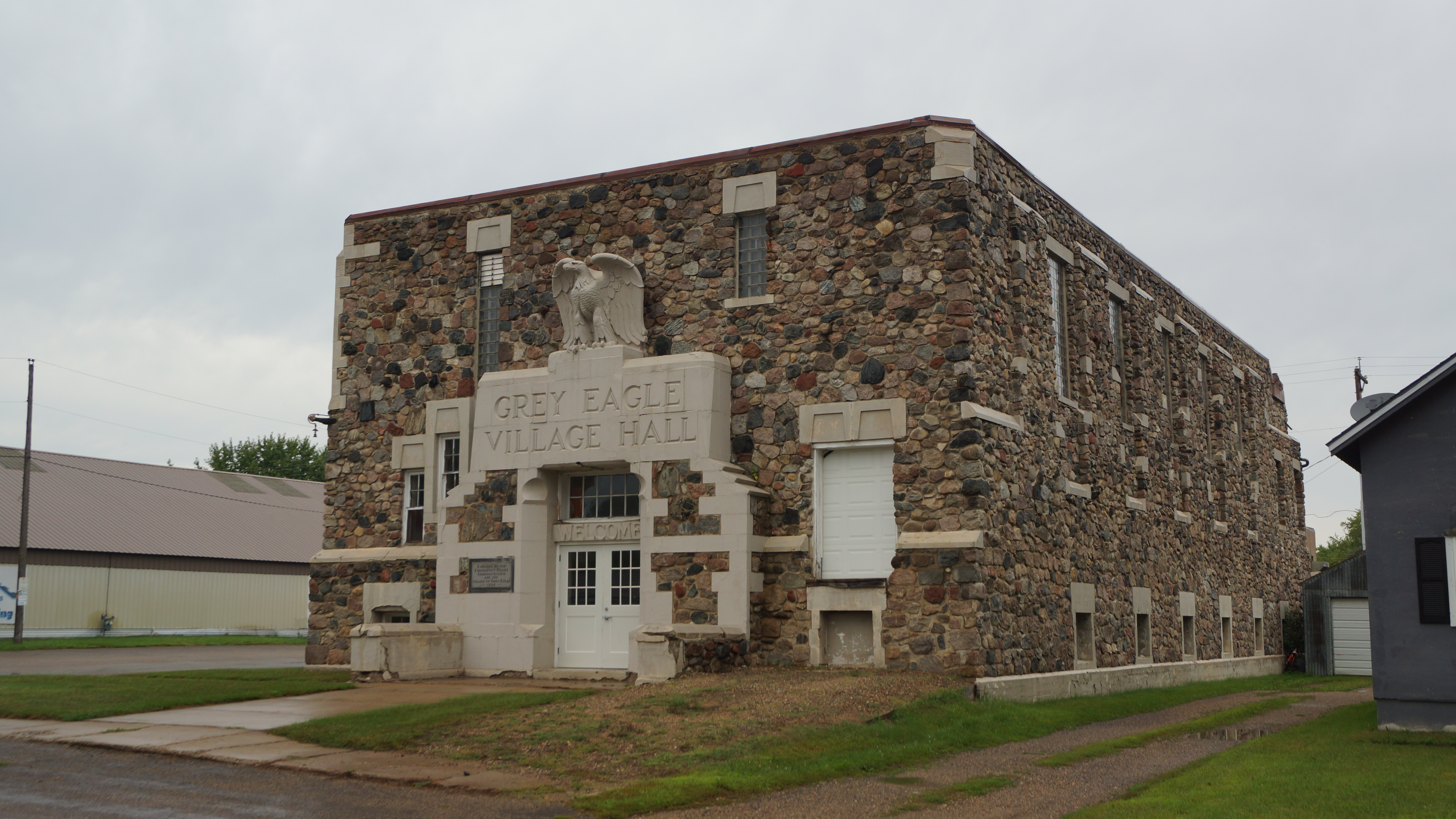
- Grey Eagle Village Hall

- Location of Grey Eagle, Minnesota
- Coordinates: 45°49′27″N 94°44′56″W
- Country: United States
- State: Minnesota
- County: Todd

Area
  - Total: 0.36 sq mi (0.92 km^{2})
  - Land: 0.36 sq mi (0.92 km^{2})
  - Water: 0 sq mi (0.00 km^{2})
- Elevation: 1,227 ft (374 m)

Population (2020)
  - Total: 330
  - Density: 926.2/sq mi (357.61/km^{2})
- Time zone: UTC-6 (Central (CST))
  - Summer (DST): UTC-5 (CDT)
- ZIP code: 56336
- Area code: 320
- FIPS code: 27-26000
- GNIS feature ID: 2394249
- Website: greyeaglemn.com

Grey Eagle is a city in Todd County, Minnesota, United States. The population was 348 at the 2010 census. By the 2020 Decennial Census the population had declined to 330.

== History ==
Grey Eagle was platted in 1882, and named after an early settler, A. M. Crowell, who had shot an eagle near the original town site. The first post office opened in the town of Grey Eagle, which is sections 7 and 8 of the township, in 1877. The town had a Northern Pacific Railroad station. The town is near the banks of Trace Lake.

Grey Eagle is less than five miles from Burtrum, a town notable for its abandoned schoolhouse.

== Geography ==
According to the United States Census Bureau, the city has an area of 0.37 square miles (0.96 km^{2}), all land.

Minnesota State Highways 28 and 287 are two of the main routes in the community.

== Demographics ==
Historical population
Census	Pop.	Note	%±
1900	313		—
1910	378		20.8%
1920	399		5.6%
1930	363		−9.0%
1940	428		17.9%
1950	400		−6.5%
1960	372		−7.0%
1970	325		−12.6%
1980	338		4.0%
1990	353		4.4%
2000	335		−5.1%
2010	348		3.9%
2020	330		−5.2%
U.S. Decennial Census

=== 2010 census ===
As of the census of 2010, there were 348 people, 165 households, and 83 families living in the city. The population density was 940.5 inhabitants per square mile (363.1/km^{2}). There were 189 housing units at an average density of 510.8 per square mile (197.2/km^{2}). The racial makeup of the city was 99.4% White and 0.6% Asian. Hispanic or Latino of any race were 0.9% of the population.

There were 165 households, of which 24.2% had children under the age of 18 living with them, 42.4% were married couples living together, 4.2% had a female householder with no husband present, 3.6% had a male householder with no wife present, and 49.7% were non-families. 44.8% of all households were made up of individuals, and 20.6% had someone living alone who was 65 years of age or older. The average household size was 2.11 and the average family size was 3.01.

The median age in the city was 44.6 years. 22.1% of residents were under the age of 18; 7.2% were between the ages of 18 and 24; 21.5% were from 25 to 44; 27.3% were from 45 to 64; and 21.8% were 65 years of age or older. The gender makeup of the city was 51.1% male and 48.9% female.

=== 2000 census ===
As of the census of 2000, there were 335 people, 151 households, and 78 families living in the city. The population density was 902.8 inhabitants per square mile (348.6/km^{2}). There were 164 housing units at an average density of 442.0 per square mile (170.7/km^{2}). The racial makeup of the city was 97.01% White, 0.90% African American, 0.30% Asian, and 1.79% from two or more races. Hispanic or Latino of any race were 0.30% of the population.

There were 151 households, out of which 27.8% had children under the age of 18 living with them, 41.1% were married couples living together, 4.6% had a female householder with no husband present, and 48.3% were non-families. 43.0% of all households were made up of individuals, and 20.5% had someone living alone who was 65 years of age or older. The average household size was 2.22 and the average family size was 3.10.

In the city, the population was spread out, with 23.6% under the age of 18, 9.6% from 18 to 24, 29.0% from 25 to 44, 19.4% from 45 to 64, and 18.5% who were 65 years of age or older. The median age was 38 years. For every 100 females, there were 95.9 males. For every 100 females age 18 and over, there were 92.5 males.

The median income for a household in the city was $32,917, and the median income for a family was $38,750. Males had a median income of $28,958 versus $18,750 for females. The per capita income for the city was $15,952. About 12.8% of families and 12.2% of the population were below the poverty line, including 12.9% of those under age 18 and 12.1% of those age 65 or over.

== Churches ==
Grey Eagle has three churches: Saint Joseph Catholic Church, Saint John Evangelical Lutheran Church (LCMS), and Grey Eagle United Methodist Church.

== Notable person ==
- Paul Ellering, professional wrestling manager (born in Melrose, resides in Grey Eagle)

== Gallery ==
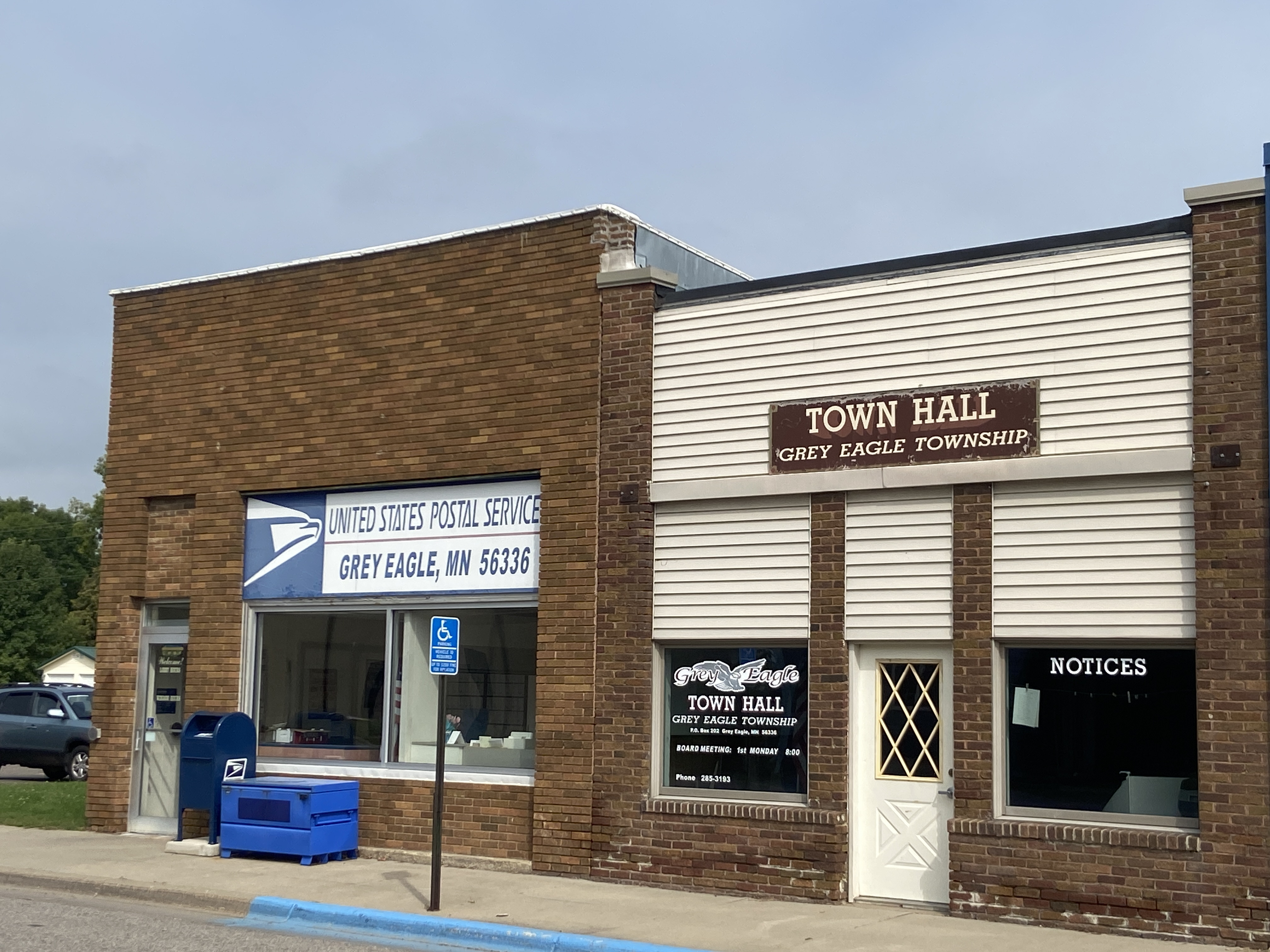
Post office and Town hall

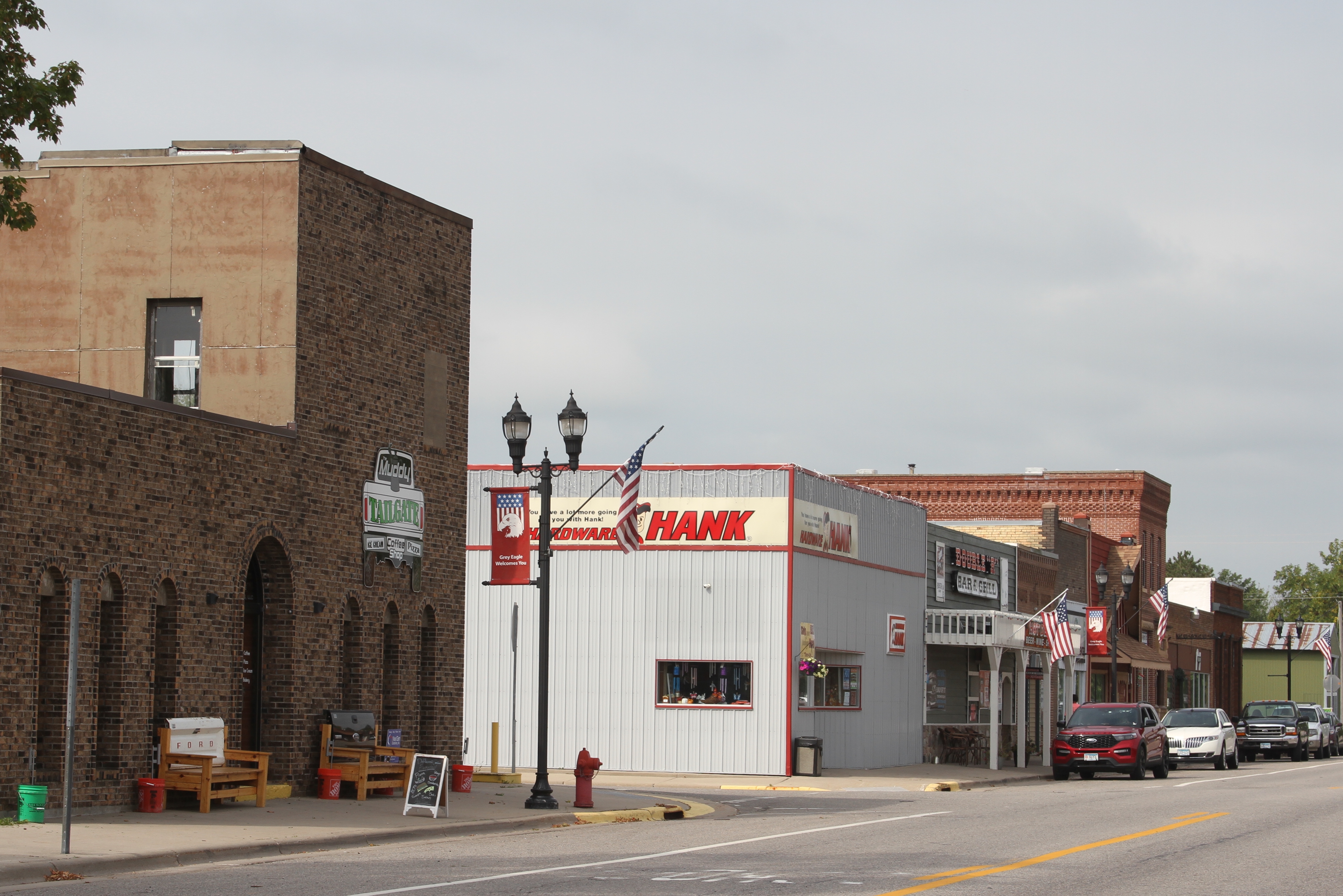
State Street at Woodman Street

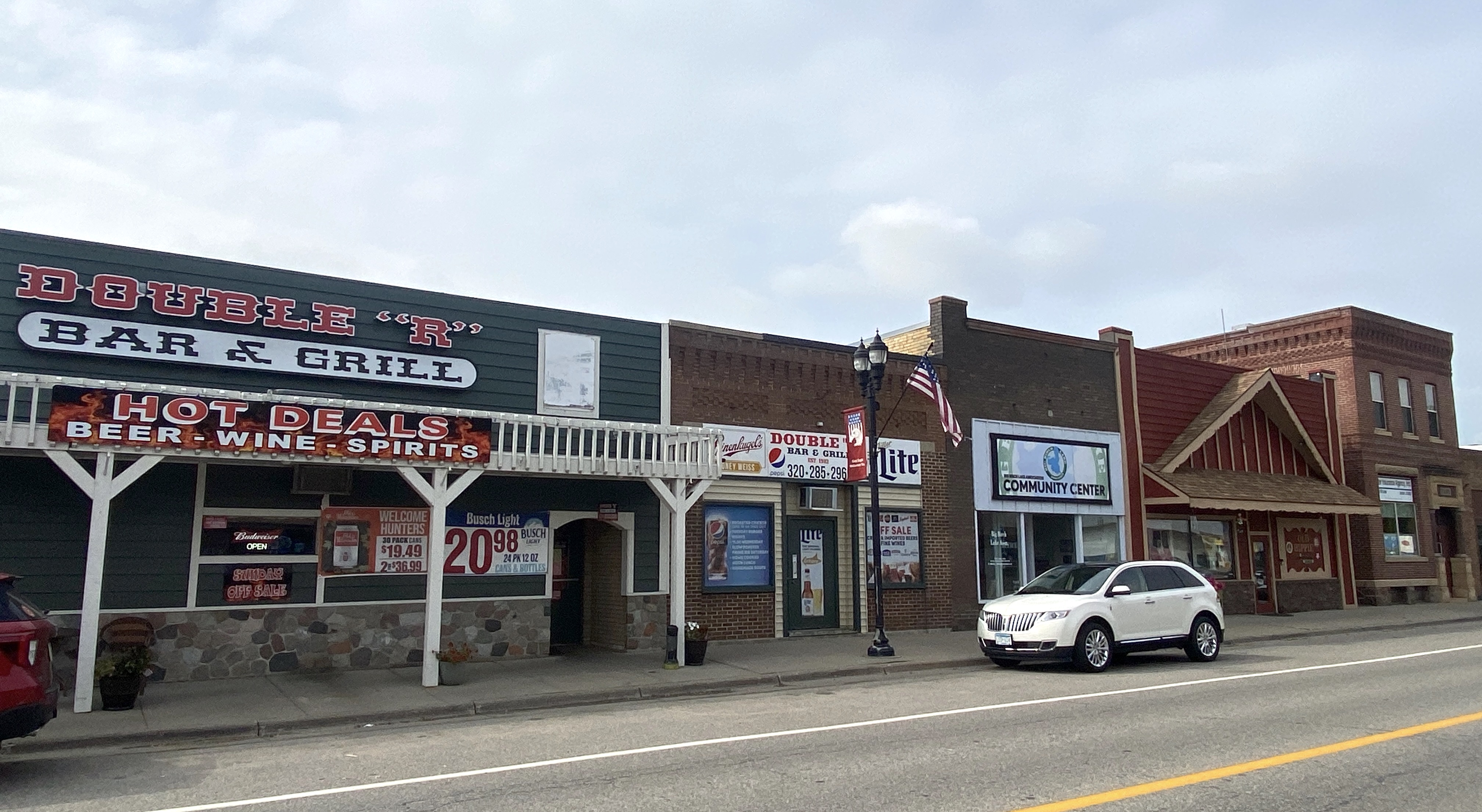
State Street, View from Southwest

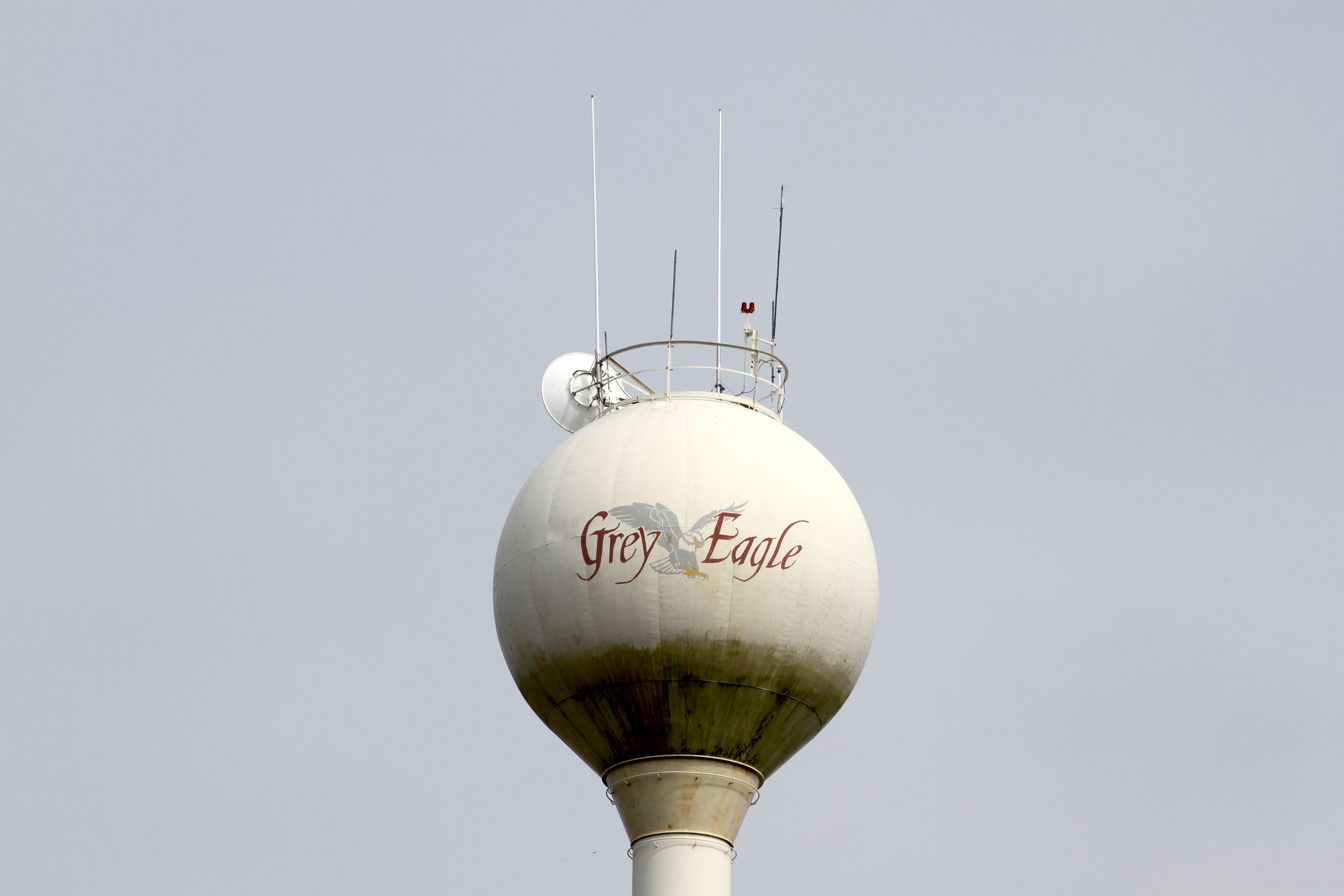
Water tower
