= Tracker =

Tracker(s) or The Tracker(s) may refer to:

== Arts and entertainment ==
=== Fictional characters ===
- Tracker (G.I. Joe), in the G.I. Joe universe
- Tracker (PAW Patrol), in the animated television series PAW Patrol
- Tracker Cameron, in the television series Degrassi: The Next Generation

=== Films ===
- Tracker (1987 film), a Soviet film directed by Roman Balayan
- The Tracker (1988 film), a Western directed by John Guillermin
- The Tracker (2002 film), an Australian film
- Tracker (2010 film), a film from New Zealand
- The Trackers (film), a 1971 American Western television film
- The Tracker, a 2019 film with Dolph Lundgren

=== Literature ===
- Tracker (comics), a five-book miniseries
- Tracker (novel), a 2015 novel set in C. J. Cherryh's Foreigner science fiction universe
- Tracker (biography), a 2017 biography of Tracker Tilmouth by Alexis Wright
- Trackers (book series), a children's book series by Patrick Carman
- The Tracker, a 1978 book by naturalist Tom Brown Jr.
- Ichneutae or Trackers, a fragmentary satyr play by Sophocles
- The Trackers of Oxyrhynchus, a 1990 play by Tony Harrison, partially based on Ichneutae

=== Music ===
- Tracker (band), an American indie rock band
- Tracker (album), by Mark Knopfler, 2015
- The Tracker, the journal of the Organ Historical Society

=== Television ===
- Tracker (Canadian TV series), a 2001–2002 science fiction series
- Tracker (American TV series), a 2024 action drama series
- Trackers (TV series), a 2019 South African crime thriller series
- "Tracker" (Stargate Atlantis), a 2008 episode

== Businesses and products ==
- Tracker (granola bar), manufactured by Mars, Incorporated
- Chevrolet Tracker or Geo Tracker, a compact SUV produced from 1989 until the end of the 2004 model year, and 2013 onwards
- Tracker Marine Group, a boat manufacturer

== Finance ==
- Index tracker, or Index fund, a type of passively managed mutual fund that mimics a benchmark market index
- Tracker mortgage, a type of variable-rate mortgage

== People (occupation) ==
- Aboriginal tracker, enlisted by early European settlers and police until recently in Australia to assist in finding food and water, locating missing persons and criminals, etc.
- Tracker in the military, beyond Australia: see reconnaissance (article so far closest related to topic)
- Tracker (politics), a person who surveils and records a candidate of a rival campaign
- Tracker, a person specializing in tracking, which involves finding and following a trail
- In Chinese history, a tracker was a labourer hired to haul large junks up the Yangtze River

== Technology ==
=== Computing ===
- Tracker (business software), developed by Automation Centre
- Tracker (file manager), the file manager and desktop in the Haiku operating system
- Tracker (search software), a file indexing and file search framework
- Tracker (video analysis software), an open source video analysis and modeling tool
- BitTorrent tracker, a server that directs the BitTorrent downloads and uploads
- A piece of software used in Internet tracking
- Music tracker, a program used to sequence music using synthesized sounds from a sound chip

=== Other ===
- Tracker (mobile phone), a system for tracking the location of a mobile phone
- Tracker (vehicle), a device for tracking the location of a vehicle
- Activity tracker, a device for tracking fitness-related activities and associated measures
- Radar tracker, part of a radar system
- S-2 Tracker, a carrier-based ASW aircraft manufactured by Grumman
- Solar tracker, a device used in some solar energy applications for orienting a photovoltaic panel or reflector toward the sun

== See also ==
- Tracer (disambiguation)
- Track (disambiguation)
- TrackR, a type of key finder
- Tracking (disambiguation)
