= Nell (band) =

South Korean band

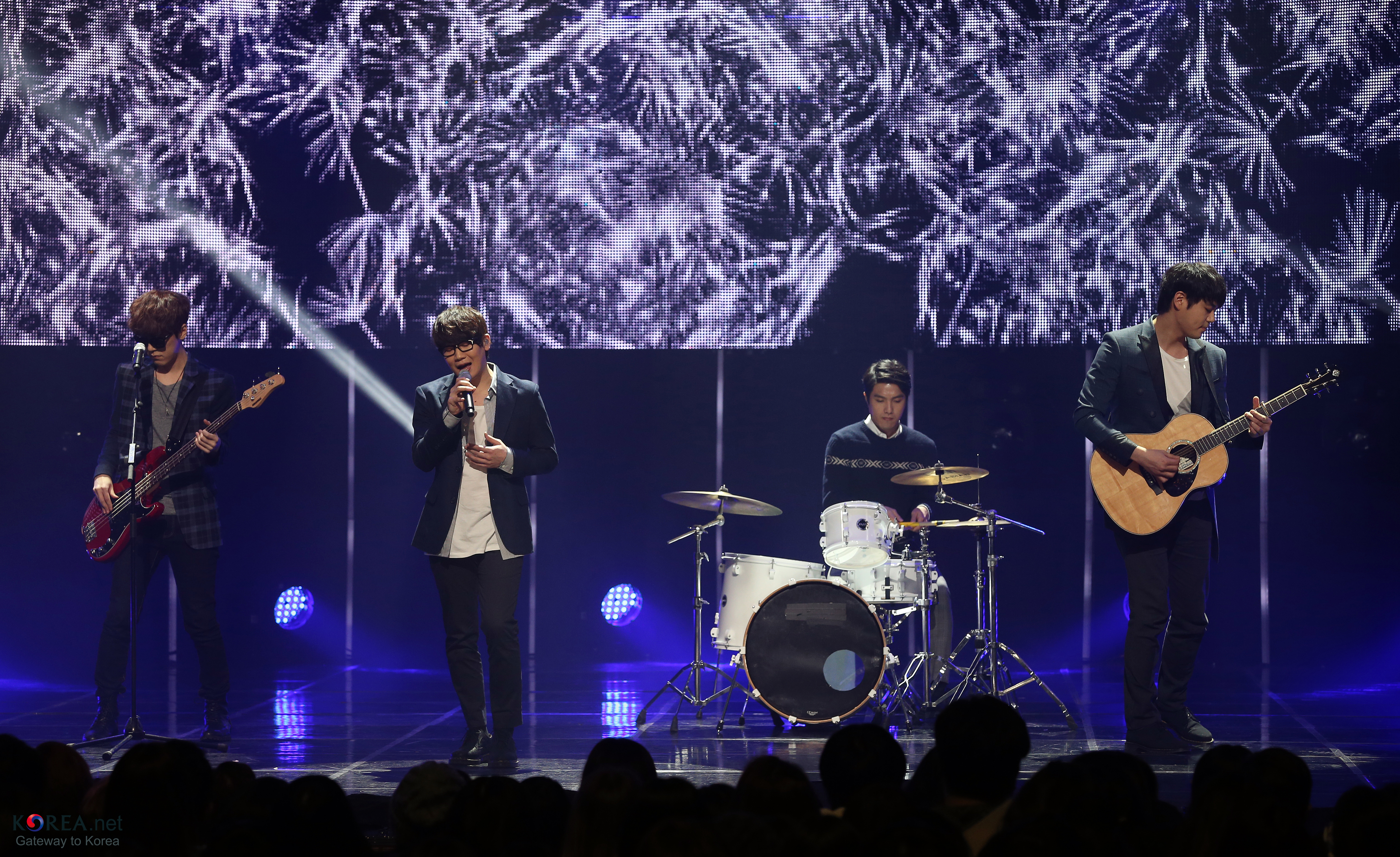

Background information
- Origin: Seoul, South Korea
- Genres: Alternative rock
- Years active: 1999–present
- Labels: Space Bohemian; Woollim; Goesoo Indigene; Home Game
- Members: Kim Jong-wan; Lee Jae-kyung; Lee Jung-hoon
- Past members: Jung Jae-won
- Website: spacebohemian.com

Nell (Korean: 넬) is a South Korean alternative rock band formed in 1999 and debuted in 2001. The band consists of lead vocalist, keyboardist and guitarist Kim Jong-wan, lead guitarist Lee Jae-kyung, bass guitarist Lee Jung-hoon and previously drummer Jung Jae-won until his departure from the group in June 2023. The group was named after the film, Nell, that starred Jodie Foster. The band is known for their gloomy and psychedelic sound, and has achieved fame with hits such as "Stay" from Let It Rain, "Thank You" from Walk Through Me, "Good Night" and "Losing Heart" from Healing Process and "Time Walking On Memory" from Separation Anxiety. Their third studio album Healing Process was chosen as one of five best recordings of the year by South Korean critics. Nell's fourth studio album Separation Anxiety was a hit in South Korea, ranking number one in various real-time album charts.

== Musical career ==
=== Early years and turning point ===
Nell was formed in 1999 by four students who had failed to pass the college entrance exam. The group performed at clubs around the Sinchon-dong area and released two indie rock albums, Reflection of and Speechless, in 2001, causing a revival of emotional rock in the country.

While performing at live clubs in Hongdae, they were picked up by Seo Taiji, and soon became the first band to promote under the record label Goesoo Indigene, a subsidiary of Seo Taiji Company in 2002. In 2006, the band decided to finish their contract with Goesoo Indigene. They signed with Woollim Entertainment.

The band is heavily influenced by numerous British bands such as Radiohead, Placebo, Travis, and Muse. They also performed a number of covers of Muse, Coldplay, Sting, and Bob Dylan during their gigs.

Nell has participated in both the 2006 and 2007 Pentaport Rock Festival of South Korea, where Placebo and Muse also performed each year.

=== 2012–2013: Comeback after hiatus, Gravity mini-album series and Japanese debut ===
After a long hiatus due to compulsory military service, they released their fifth studio album titled Slip Away on April 10, 2012, with the title track "The Day Before". Its music video starred Lee Min-ki and Song Jae-rim, but none of the Nell members appeared. Slip Away was a hit in South Korea, placed top rank on various real-time music charts, such as Mnet, Bugs, and Olleh Music. Kim Jong-wan featured in G-Dragon's song "Today" in his 2012 album One of a Kind.

On November 22, 2012, Nell's official homepage included a new picture signaling Nell's comeback. The picture showed a large moon that had a kind of explosion going on. Nell's new album, Holding onto Gravity was released on December 3. On December 2, 2012, Woollim's YouTube official channel released the music video for "White Night" starring Im Soo-jung.

In January 2013 Nell made their Japanese debut with the Japanese edition of Slip Away, released by Home Game Records, a Watanabe Music Publishing label dedicated to Korean rock. In May 2013, the official Woollim YouTube channel uploaded a teaser for the upcoming mini-album which was scheduled for release in June. Nell's official homepage was updated on June 3 confirming the release date for the second part of their three-part mini-album series of Gravity, Escaping Gravity. The music video for the mini-album's title track, "Ocean of Light", was released on June 9.

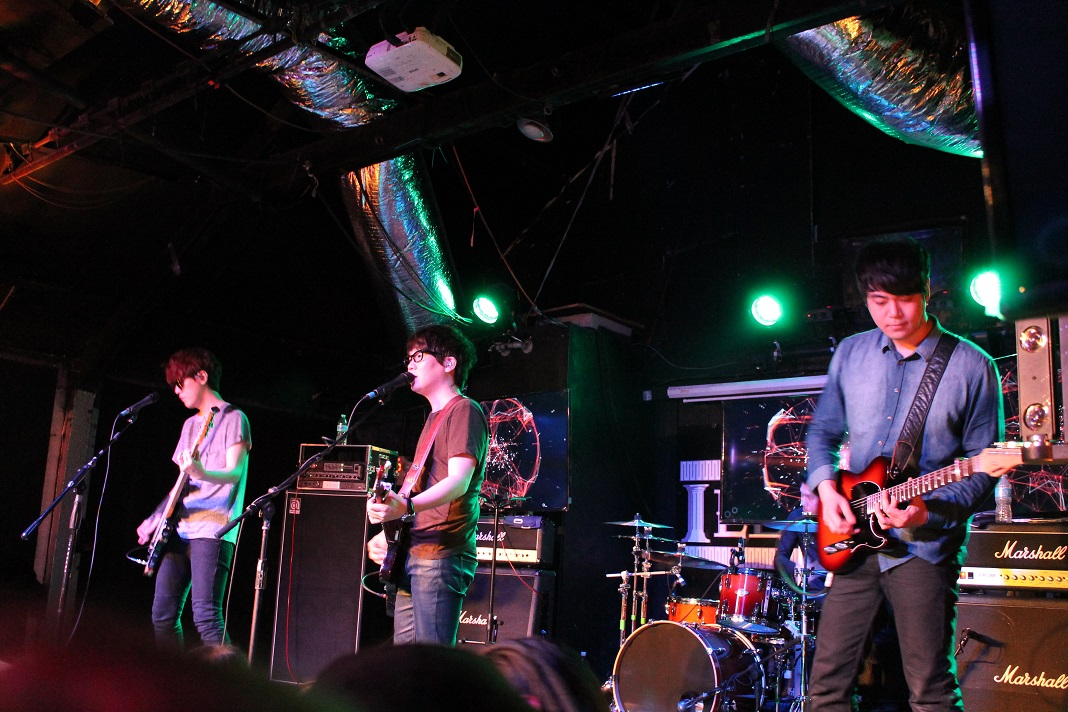
Nell at 2014 K-Pop Night Out at SXSW

=== 2014: participation in U.S. concert and Billboard recognition ===
On March 11, 2014, the band performed at the second K-Pop Night Out at SXSW in Austin, Texas along with Hyuna and Jay Park and others. On December 11, their album Newton's Apple was selected as number two on "Billboard's 10 Best K-Pop Albums of 2014" by Billboard K-Town with the write-up, "The strongest rock album of the year, Newton's Apple highlights Nell's vocalist/chief composer Kim Jong-wan's clever and honest songwriting skills, best heard on the single 'Four Times Around the Sun' and 'Grey Zone' ... All the lyrics are wrapped in warm, lush arrangements and instrumentals that enchant the listener simply by themselves."

=== 2016: Space Bohemian ===
On March 22, 2016, it was announced that Nell ended their contract with Woollim Entertainment and set up an independent record label named Space Bohemian. On August 18, 2016, they released their first album with their new label, C, with the title song "Dream Catcher".

== Members ==
=== Current ===
- Kim Jong-wan (김종완) – vocals, guitar, keyboard, drums
- Lee Jae-kyung (이재경) – lead guitar
- Lee Jung-hoon (이정훈) – bass guitar, tambourine, keyboard, chorus

=== Former ===
- Jung Jae-won (정재원) – drums

== Discography ==
=== Studio albums ===
Title	Album details	Peak chart positions	Sales
Title	Album details	KOR	Sales
Reflection of (Indie album)	Released: January 19, 2001; Label: Goesoo Indigene; Formats: CD	—	—N/a
Speechless (Indie album)	Released: September 26, 2001; Label: Goesoo Indigene, NHN Entertainment; Formats: CD, digital download	—	—N/a
Let It Rain	Released: June 12, 2003; Label: Goesoo Indigene, Spotlight; Formats: CD, digital download	—	—N/a
Walk Through Me	Released: November 18, 2004; Label: Goesoo Indigene, Spotlight; Formats: CD, digital download	—	—N/a
Healing Process	Released: September 21, 2006; Label: Woollim Entertainment, CJ E&M; Formats: CD, digital download	51	—N/a
Separation Anxiety	Released: March 21, 2008; Label: Woollim Entertainment, CJ E&M; Formats: CD, digital download	59	—N/a
Slip Away	Released: April 10, 2012; Label: Woollim Entertainment, LOEN Entertainment; Formats: CD, digital download	1	KOR: 26,143
Newton's Apple	Released: February 27, 2014; Label: Woollim Entertainment, LOEN Entertainment; Formats: CD, digital download	6	KOR: 13,882
C	Released: August 19, 2016; Label: Space Bohemian, LOEN Entertainment; Formats: CD, digital download	7	KOR: 12,984
Let's Part (행복했으면 좋겠어)	Released: November 14, 2018; Label: Space Bohemian, LOEN Entertainment; Formats: CD, digital download	16	KOR: 4,636
Colors in Black	Released: October 10, 2019; Label: Space Bohemian, Kakao M; Formats: CD, digital download, streaming	13	KOR: 8,775
Moments in Between	Released: September 2, 2021; Label: Space Bohemian, Kakao M; Formats: CD, digital download, streaming	38	KOR: 4,921
"—" denotes releases that did not chart.

=== Extended plays ===
Title	Album details
Let's Take a Walk (Re-arranged album)	Released: June 25, 2007; Label: Woollim Entertainment, CJ E&M; Formats: CD, digital download
The Trace (Live album)	Released: November 28, 2008; Label: Woollim Entertainment, CJ E&M; Formats: CD, digital download
Escaping Gravity	Released: June 10, 2013; Label: Woollim Entertainment, LOEN Entertainment; Formats: CD, digital download

=== Single albums ===
Title	Album details
Holding onto Gravity	Released: December 3, 2012; Label: Woollim Entertainment, LOEN Entertainment; Formats: CD, digital download

=== Singles ===
Title	Year	Peak chart positions	Sales (DL)	Album
Title	Year	KOR	Sales (DL)	Album
"Stay"	2003	—	—N/a	Let It Rain
"Thank You"	2004	—	—N/a	Walk Through Me
"Good Night"	2006	—	—N/a	Healing Process
"Losing Heart" (마음을 잃다)	2006	—	—N/a	Healing Process
"It's Okay"	2007	—	—N/a	Let's Take a Walk
"Time Spent Walking Through Memories" (기억을 걷는 시간)	2008	148	—N/a	Separation Anxiety
"Recede" (멀어지다)	2008	—	—N/a	Separation Anxiety
"Part 2"	2008	—	—N/a	The Trace
"The Day Before" (그리고 남겨진 것들)	2012	3	KOR: 870,599	Slip Away
"White Night" (백야)	2012	5	KOR: 490,734	Holding Onto Gravity
"Words You Shouldn't Believe" (믿어선 안될 말) Live ver.	2013	66	KOR: 47,334	Non-album single
"Ocean Of Light"	2013	7	KOR: 291,411	Escaping Gravity
"Four Times Around The Sun" (지구가 태양을 네번)	2014	11	KOR: 406,761	Newton's Apple
"Green Nocturne" (청춘연가)	2014	9	KOR: 110,174	Non-album singles
"Star Shell"	2015	77	KOR: 53,422	Non-album singles
"Lost In Perspective" (3인칭의 필요성)	2015	25	KOR: 125,384	Non-album singles
"Dream Catcher"	2016	93	KOR: 43,076	C
"Vain Hope" (희망고문)	2016	—	KOR: 16,726	C
"Loop" (그리워하려고 해)	2016	37	KOR: 67,857	Non-album singles
"Life Is Ninano" (사는게 니나노)	2016	—	—N/a	Non-album singles
"Broken" (부서진)	2017	99	KOR: 19,637	Non-album singles
"Today" (오늘은)	2017	—	KOR: 21,054	Non-album singles
"See U in Five" (오분 뒤에 봐)	2019	147	—N/a	Colors in Black
"Duet" (듀엣)	2020	—	—N/a	Moments in Between
"Don't Hurry Up"	2021	—	—N/a	Moments in Between
"Wanderer"	2023	—	—N/a	Wanderer
"—" denotes releases that did not chart.

=== Other charted songs ===
Title	Year	Peak chart positions	Sales (DL)	Album
Title	Year	KOR	Sales (DL)	Album
"Go"	2012	33	KOR: 181,297	Slip Away
"The Ending	2012	34	KOR: 186,467	Slip Away
"Cliff Parade"	2012	36	KOR: 170,330	Slip Away
"Standing In The Rain"	2012	37	KOR: 174,678	Slip Away
"In Days Gone Bye"	2012	40	KOR: 162,270	Slip Away
"Slip Away"	2012	45	KOR: 125,317	Slip Away
"Losing Control"	2012	47	KOR: 94,232	Slip Away
"Beautiful Stranger"	2012	51	KOR: 89,968	Slip Away
"Hopeless Valentine"	2012	52	KOR: 87,168	Slip Away
"Holding Onto Gravity"	2012	39	KOR: 122,539	Holding Onto Gravity
"Blue"	2012	58	KOR: 64,985	Holding Onto Gravity
"Coin Seller"	2012	84	KOR: 49,484	Holding Onto Gravity
"Perfect"	2013	67	KOR: 42,800	Escaping Gravity
"Haven"	2013	78	KOR: 37,902	Escaping Gravity
"Boy – X"	2013	82	KOR: 35,445	Escaping Gravity
"Burn"	2013	90	KOR: 33,848	Escaping Gravity
"Walk Out"	2013	—	KOR: 28,983	Escaping Gravity
"Memories Of A Stranger" (타인의 기억)	2014	63	KOR: 60,209	Newton's Apple
"The History Of Silence" (침묵의 역사)	2014	81	KOR: 31,321	Newton's Apple
"Fantasy"	2014	84	KOR: 29,005	Newton's Apple
"The Great Escape" (소멸탈출)	2014	87	KOR: 27,294	Newton's Apple
"Night Of Reincarnation" (환생의 밤)	2014	91	KOR: 26,490	Newton's Apple
"Grey Zone"	2014	93	KOR: 25,699	Newton's Apple
"Newton's Apple"	2014	—	KOR: 25,015	Newton's Apple
"Sunshine"	2014	—	KOR: 24,752	Newton's Apple
"Decompose"	2014	—	KOR: 24,412	Newton's Apple
"Dear Genovese"	2014	—	KOR: 23,837	Newton's Apple
"Horizon of Time" (시간의 지평선)	2016	—	KOR: 16,862	C
"—" denotes releases that did not chart.

=== Soundtrack appearances ===
Year	Title	Album
2013	"Run"	Two Weeks OST
2016	"Waiting for You" (기다린다)	Beautiful Gong Shim OST
2016	"Breath" (숨)	The Good Wife OST
2020	"Blue Moon"	Tale of the Nine Tailed OST

== Awards and nominations ==
Year	Award	Category	Work	Result	Ref.
2004	2nd Korean Music Awards	Artist of the Year (Group)	Walk Through Me	Nominated	
2005	2005 Mnet Asian Music Awards	Best Rock Performance	"Thank You"	Nominated	
2006	4th Korean Music Awards	Artist of the Year (Group)	Healing Process	Nominated	
2006	4th Korean Music Awards	Best Modern Rock Album	Healing Process	Nominated	
2006	2006 Mnet Asian Music Awards	Best Rock Performance	"Losing My Mind" (마음을 잃다)	Nominated	
2007	5th Korean Music Awards	Best Modern Rock Artist of the Year Picked by Netizens	"Let's Take a Walk"	Won	
2007	2007 Mnet KM Music Festival	Best Rock Performance	"It's Okay"	Nominated	
2008	10th Mnet KM Music Festival	Best Rock Performance	"Time To Walk Memories"	Won	
2008	23rd Golden Disk Awards	Best Rock Award	–	Won	
2011	5th Grand Mint Festival	Best Performance	–	Won	
2011	5th Grand Mint Festival	Best Moment	–	Won	
2012	14th Mnet Asian Music Awards	Best Band Performance	"The Day Before"	Nominated	
2012	4th MelOn Music Awards	Music Style Award – Best Rock	"The Day Before"	Won	
2013	15th Mnet Asian Music Awards	Best Band Performance	"Ocean Of Light"	Nominated	
2014	16th Mnet Asian Music Awards	Best Band Performance	"Four Times Around The Sun"	Nominated	
2015	17th Mnet Asian Music Awards	Best Band Performance	"Green Nocturne"	Nominated	
2018	MBC Plus X Genie Music Awards	Song of the Year	"Today" (with Groovy Room)	Nominated	
2018	MBC Plus X Genie Music Awards	Band Music Award	"Today" (with Groovy Room)	Nominated	
2018	MBC Plus X Genie Music Awards	Genie Music Popularity Award	Nell and Groovy Room	Nominated	
