= The Trace (album) =

Live album by Nell
- Released: November 28, 2008
- Genre: Modern Rock, Indie Rock
- Label: WOOLIM Entertainment

Nell chronology
Separation Anxiety (2008)	The Trace (2008)	Slip Away (2012)

The Trace is first DVD live concert from South Korean rock band Nell, released on November 28, 2008. Includes the full live recording of Nell's concert "Stay" which was held at the Olympics Hall in Seoul on July 19, 2008. Four new tracks was added into mini CD as bonus.

== Track listing ==
=== DISC 1 ===
1. Down
2. 1:03
3. Tokyo
4. Moonlight Punch Romance
5. 현실의 현실
6. 섬
7. Good Night
8. 기억을 걷는 시간
9. Stay
10. Fisheye Lens
11. Marionette
12. Minus
13. Promise Me
14. 기생충
15. Onetime Bestseller
16. 백색왜성
17. 믿어선 안될 말
18. 마음을 잃다
19. 12 Seconds

=== DISC 2 ===
Practice Video, Backstage, and Interview

=== Mini CD ===
1. Part 1
2. Part 2
3. Act 5
4. Part 2 (acoustic ver.)
