= Trace, West Virginia =

- Unincorporated community
- Location within the state of West Virginia Trace, West Virginia (the United States)
- Coordinates: 37°53′14″N 82°11′48″W
- Country: United States
- State: West Virginia
- County: Mingo
- Elevation: 928 ft (283 m)
- Time zone: UTC-5 (Eastern (EST))
  - Summer (DST): UTC-4 (EDT)
- GNIS ID: 1549957

Trace is an unincorporated community in Mingo County, West Virginia, United States. The town's post office no longer exists.

== Etymology ==
The origin of the name Trace is obscure, although it may be derived from nearby Dingess Trace Branch Creek.
