= Tracking software =

Tracking software may mean:

- GPS tracking software
- Multitrack recording software
- Music tracker
- Computer surveillance software
  - Employee monitoring software
  - Email tracking
  - Chat log
  - Keystroke logging
  - Parental controls
  - Spyware
  - Mobile phone tracking
  - Website tracking
