= 2-NBDG =

- 2-NBDG

Names
- IUPAC name 2-(7-Nitro-2,1,3-benzoxadiazol-4-yl)-D-glucosamine
- Systematic IUPAC name (2R,3R,4S,5R)-3,4,5,6-Tetrahydroxy-2-[(7-nitro-2,1,3-benzoxadiazol-4-yl)amino]hexanal
- Other names 2-NBD Glucose

Identifiers
CAS Number	186689-07-6
3D model (JSmol)	Interactive image
ChemSpider	5143305
PubChem CID	6711157
UNII	JE4F4P486R
CompTox Dashboard (EPA)	DTXSID001348102 DTXSID00425133, DTXSID001348102
- InChI: InChI=1S/C12H14N4O8/c17-3-6(11(20)12(21)8(19)4-18)13-5-1-2-7(16(22)23)10-9(5)14-24-15-10/h1-3,6,8,11-13,18-21H,4H2/t6-,8+,11+,12+/m0/s1 Key: QUTFFEUUGHUPQC-ILWYWAAHSA-N
- SMILES: O=C([H])[C@H](NC1=CC=C([N+]([O-])=O)C2=NON=C21)[C@H]([C@@H]([C@@H](CO)O)O)O

Properties
Chemical formula	C_{12}H_{14}N_{4}O_{8}
Molar mass	342.2646 g/mol
- Except where otherwise noted, data are given for materials in their standard state (at 25 °C [77 °F], 100 kPa). Infobox references

2-NBDG is a fluorescent tracer used for monitoring glucose uptake into living cells; it consists of a glucosamine molecule substituted with a 7-nitrobenzofurazan fluorophore at its amine group. It is widely referred to a fluorescent derivative of glucose, and it is used in cell biology to visualize uptake of glucose by cells. Cells that have taken up the compound fluoresce green.

2-NBDG is similar to radiolabeled glucose in that both can be used to detect glucose transport. Unlike radiolabeled glucose, 2-NBDG is compatible with fluorescence techniques such as a fluorescent microscopy, flow cytometry, and fluorimetry.

The compound is taken up by a variety of mammalian, plant, and microbial cells In bacterial cells, the predominant transporter is the mannose phosphotransferase system. Cells that lack these or other compatible transporters do not take up 2-NBDG. In mammalian cells, one transporter for 2-NBDG is GLUT2. In T cells, 2-NBDG was transported by another, unidentified transporter and it did not match radiolabeled glucose transport.

Like glucose, 2-NBDG is transported according to Michaelis–Menten kinetics. However, transport of 2-NBDG has a lower V_{max} (maximum rate), and thus the rate of transport is generally slower than glucose.

Once taken up, the compound is metabolized to a non-fluorescent derivative, as shown in Escherichia coli. The identity and further metabolism of this non-fluorescent derivative has not been established.
