= Seo Taiji Company =

South Korean entertainment company

- Founder: Seo Taiji
- Headquarters: South Korea
- Subsidiaries: Goesoo Indigene
- Website: www.seotaijicompany.com

Seo Taiji Company (Korean: 서태지 컴퍼니) is a South Korean entertainment company headquartered in Seoul, South Korea. The company was founded in 2001 by South Korean musician Seo Taiji.

== History ==
The company was founded on March 24, 2001. In December 2001, Seo Taiji Company revealed the "Seotaiji font" for its Christmas events. From January 22 to 30, the company hosted the first public hiring of its employees. In 2002, the company signed a joint business affiliation agreement regarding the collaboration on company affairs and promotion of Taiji's 7th and 8th album. On October 7, 2002, company affiliated with the Korean portal site Daum. In 2002 its sub label Goesoo Indigene was founded which aimed to find underground talents. Nell was the first to debut in the sublabel.

== Artists ==
- Diablo
- Nell
- Pia
