= Grey Eagle Village Hall =

- U.S. National Register of Historic Places
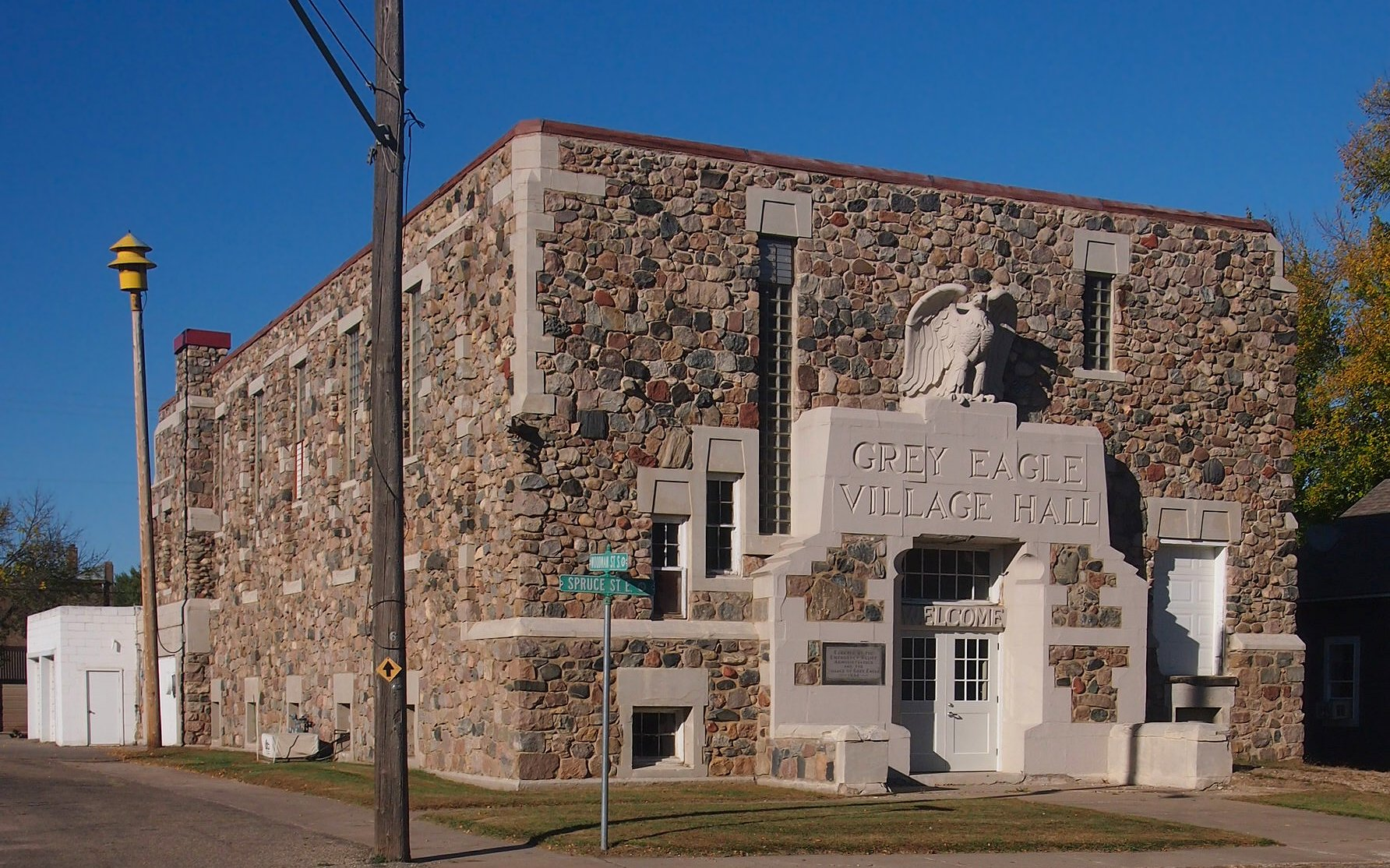
- The Grey Eagle Village Hall from the southwest

- Location within Minnesota Location within the United States
- Location: Spruce and Woodman Streets, Grey Eagle, Minnesota
- Coordinates: 45°49′25.5″N 94°44′52.5″W
- Area: Less than one acre
- Built: 1934
- Architect: Fred Pfeiffer
- Architectural style: Moderne
- NRHP reference No.: 85001992
- Designated: September 5, 1985

The Grey Eagle Village Hall is a multipurpose municipal building in Grey Eagle, Minnesota, United States. It was built in 1934 as a federally funded New Deal project to create jobs during the Great Depression. It originally contained local government offices, a fire station, and a community auditorium. The building was listed on the National Register of Historic Places in 1985 for having local significance in the themes of architecture and politics/government. It was nominated for being a superlative example of the public works projects of the Civil Works Administration.

== Description ==
The Grey Eagle Village Hall is a rectangular, two-story building measuring about 40 feet (12 m) wide and 90 feet (27 m) long. The walls are uncoursed, undressed fieldstone. This contrasts with the smooth, cast concrete trim used for window surrounds, quoins, a belt course, and the projecting main entry. The entry, centrally placed on the south façade, is surmounted by a large panel engraved with the words "Grey Eagle Village Hall" and a four-foot-tall (1.2 m) sculpture of an eagle. Directly above the front doors is a smaller concrete panel inscribed with the word "Welcome". The east and west walls each have six fieldstone pilasters. Windows are narrow and filled with glass brick.

A garage door at the northwest corner allowed for storage of Grey Eagle's firefighting equipment. Later in the 20th century this was augmented with a two-stall cinder block addition. A one-story pump house with fieldstone construction similar to the main building stands just to the northeast.

Inside, the auditorium occupies the main space of the upper floor, with an elevated stage at the north end as well as dressing rooms. A wraparound balcony originally provided additional viewing. The elevated stage allowed the necessary height for the fire equipment stall, which is at ground level while the rest of the lower floor is half-sunk. At the time of the building's National Register nomination, that level contained a meeting room, kitchen, bowling alley, and utility space for a boiler and coal storage.

== History ==
The Grey Eagle Village Hall was built as a project of the Civil Works Administration (CWA). This was a temporary agency created just for the winter of 1933–34 to create work for an anticipated surge of unemployed people which the existing New Deal agencies weren't prepared to handle. The CWA, moreover, distributed funds directly from the federal government, while its sister agencies—namely the Federal Emergency Relief Administration and the Public Works Administration—allocated money to state agencies that decided which projects to accept.

The Grey Eagle Village Hall was designed by CWA staff architect Fred Pfeiffer. The use of fieldstone conformed to usual New Deal guidelines: it was inexpensive and available locally, but time-consuming to gather and transport, so the majority of the funds went to the laborers.

There were plenty of applicants looking for work in the largely agricultural Todd County, mostly farmers hit hard by a soft market for produce and dairy goods. Construction began in March 1934. The CWA – always intended as a temporary program – was disbanded that same month, but the Grey Eagle project continued without interruption. Laborers were divided into three shifts each working two days a week. The concrete trim was cast on site. The concrete eagle statue topping the entryway not only reflected the town name but happened to be the symbol of the CWA.

The CWA covered 90 percent of the costs of the project. This allowed for a building that would have been far beyond the means of local government. In fact the auditorium was very generously proportioned given that Grey Eagle's population was under 500. John P. Devaney, chief justice of the Minnesota Supreme Court, spoke at the hall's dedication ceremony on September 27, 1934.

A local memoirist recalled the auditorium being used as a roller rink around the early 1940s. The village hall was Grey Eagle's primary meeting space until the construction of a new high school with a gymnasium/auditorium around 1960. At the time of its National Register nomination in 1985, the fire department and city offices had recently moved to a new building, and the hall was being used by a local company to manufacture personal flotation devices.

== See also ==
- List of city and town halls in the United States
- National Register of Historic Places listings in Todd County, Minnesota
