= Intelligence and Information Warfare Directorate =

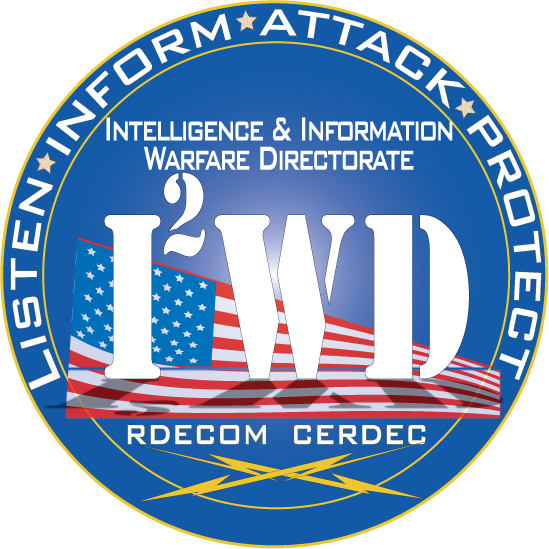
- Country: United States
- Branch: US Army, CERDEC
- Type: Research and Development
- Garrison/HQ: Aberdeen Proving Ground, MD
- Motto: Listen. Inform. Attack. Protect.

Commanders
- Director: Gary Blohm
- Deputy Director: Michael Lombardi

The Intelligence and Information Warfare Directorate (or I2WD) is a component of the US Army Communications-Electronics RD&E Center, based out of Aberdeen Proving Ground. Consisting of five primary divisions, I2WD forms a Research and Development (R&D) enterprise.

Operations previously resided at Fort Monmouth, NJ. However, due to the 2005 Base Realignment and Closure act, the majority of I2WD activities were transferred to Aberdeen Proving Ground, September 2011.

== Core capabilities ==
- Radar/combat identification
- Electronic warfare air/ground survivability equipment
- Information and network operations
- Signals intelligence (SIGINT)
- Modeling and simulation
- Information fusion
- Measurement and signatures intelligence
- Electronic warfare countermeasures
- Intelligence dissemination
