= Trace Creek (Twelvemile Creek tributary) =

Stream in the American state of Missouri

Coordinates: 37.368663°N 90.449283°W

Trace Creek is a stream in Madison County in the U.S. state of Missouri. It is a tributary of Twelvemile Creek.

Trace Creek was named for an Indian path near its course.

== See also ==
- List of rivers of Missouri
