= Trace Lake =

Lake in the state of Minnesota, United States

- Location within Minnesota
- Location: Todd County, Minnesota
- Coordinates: 45°49′49″N 94°45′22″W
- Type: lake

Trace Lake is a lake in Todd County, in the U.S. state of Minnesota.

Trace Lake was named for Ferdinand Trace, a pioneer who settled there.

== See also ==
- List of lakes in Minnesota
