= Trace Creek (Castor River tributary) =

Stream in the U.S. state of Missouri

Coordinates: 37.277830°N 90.220944°W

Trace Creek is a stream in Bollinger County in the U.S. state of Missouri. It is a tributary of the Castor River.

Trace Creek most likely was named for a Native-American path along its course.

== See also ==
- List of rivers of Missouri
