= Trace (manhwa) =

South Korean manhwa series

- Genre: Science fantasy
- Author: Go Yeong-hun
- Publisher: Pop Toon
- Original run: 2007–2010
- Volumes: 7

Trace (Korean: 트레이스) is a South Korean webtoon series written and illustrated by the manhwa artist Go Yeong-hun, under his pen name "Nasty Cat". The series explores the dark sides of human nature like envy, jealousy, and selfishness. Yeong-hun has stated that he wants to create a world of heroes with a Korean identity.

Trace won the first prize and Netizen's Choice Award at the 10th SICAF International Digital Cartoon Competition held in 2006, for which Go was awarded ten million won. (approximately $970 USD at the time)

Since April 2007, his manhwa has been featured on Daum, one of the major internet portals of South Korea and the birthplace of many hit webtoons.

== Plot ==
The story is set in contemporary South Korea. About 30 years before the present day, unidentified creatures resembling humans appeared on Earth and attacked mankind. The monsters caused mass destruction and chaos, and were known as "Troubles". Along with the first appearance of the monsters, mutants with supernatural abilities known as "Traces" were also born. Traces are the only mutants who can fight Troubles, but are considered freaks and shunned by the general population because they often misuse their powers.

The plot revolves around two main characters: Sah Ghang Gwon, a high school student born a Trace who attempts to hide his abilities, and Kim Yoon Seong, who acquired his Trace abilities in his early 30s. Soon after Kim Yoon Seong acquired his powers, his wife and daughter were taken away from him for experimental purposes.

=== Story arcs ===
- Things You Need to Let Go: Ghang Gwon was taken in by Tae Eun's family as a child, and hides the fact that he is a Trace. At night he hunts Troubles to protect Tae Eun and her father, whom he considers family. His Trace identity is revealed at school, forcing him to leave temporarily and making him realize that he cannot live the way most humans do because of his ability.
- Beggar: When Kim Yoon Seong, a middle-aged man, realizes that he has Trace abilities he tries to hide them. When the government discovers his secret and takes away his family, he joins a group of other Traces to help him get into the facility where he believes his family is being held.
- Rose: Morrienoah Jin, a child who can shoot things with his fingers, works as an assassin until a girl named Jang Mi asks him to protect her. Jin is afraid of his love for Jang Mi, but realizes that he cannot control it.
- Rebellion: Trace groups formed by Kim Yun Seong and Pierrot gather at an assembly. The beggar group of Traces has old and new faces after Seong goes to see a mysterious Trace to augment his abilities. They begin to attack experimental laboratories throughout Korea, nabbing top scientists and battling other Trace groups which include the mysterious, government-sponsored Hanjo.
- The Last Day, Part 1
- The Last Day, Part 2
- Outro and Afterwards

== Main characters ==
Sa Ghang Gwon

Sa Ghang Gwon is a Trace. He is born with ice powers which he cannot control, frequently attacking his own parents. With no cure or solution to his powers, his parents abandon him on a street. He wanders around, living his life as a scavenger and losing his emotions.

During his first battle against a Trouble, after realizing that he was unable to defeat his opponent, he encased himself in ice and passed out in a park. Thereafter, he is found by a girl named Han Tae Eun. She takes him home and asks her father if she could keep him, calling Ghang Gwon her possession. Her family, consisting of only her and her father, adopts him. Ghang Gwon hides his Trace powers from them, fearing that they would abandon him if they found out about his powers like his parents did.

Over the years, he continued to battle Troubles, honing his skills. In school, a Trouble attacked his class, prompting him to attack the Trouble. Tae Eun begged of him not to get involved, knowing that his identity as Trace would be revealed if he did. However, Ghang Gwon engages the Trouble anyways. Afterwards, he was taken by the government and enrolled in a Trace school. His objective is to leave the Trace school and return to his family as soon as possible.

Ghang Gwon is quiet and mostly antisocial. He hates himself for being a Trace, hiding it from Tae Eun and her father while battling Troubles to ensure the safety of his step-family. He is bullied and submits easily to his classmates' beatings without complaint for the sake of Tae Eun's safety. He is extremely protective of her and her father, and sees them as his family.

Han Tae Eun

Han Tae Eun is well known in her school as a formidable fighter, more inclined to her fists than talking things through. She often yells, especially at Ghang Gwon when he angers her.

As a child, her mother was killed by a rogue Trace. Tae Eun repeatedly visited the same spot where her mother died until she found a barely conscious Ghang Gwon lying there. She ultimately discovers he is a Trace and labors to protect his identity, unbeknownst to him.

After Ghang Gwon was taken away by the government, Tae Eun declared that she would become a Trace like him. She repeatedly battles Troubles risking her own life in the process, eventually awakening as a Trace with inhuman strength and abilities.

Kim Yoon Seong

Kim Yoon Seong is described a man with a perfect life: a job, a loving wife, and a daughter. This changes when he turned into a Trace one day. As a law-abiding citizen, he decides to register himself as a Trace rather than hiding his identity from the government. After registering, he was separated from his family, who were taken to a secret facility where other family members of identified Traces are kept.

In order to keep in contact with his family, he attempted to enter the facility, but was stopped by a group of guards who chased him away. During his encounter with the guards, he meets Jeong Hee Sub, another Trace who was trying to get into the facility. They formed a team began recruiting other members. Eventually, the team successfully entered the facility, whereupon it was discovered that their family members had died while being used for experimental purposes.

Morrienoah Jin

Jin is an emotionless Trace who kills people he deems to be bad, believing that "The good should live, the bad should die". After saving Morrie, he was raised by Morrie to become a killer, easily obtaining the top title of Morrienoah. Jin was described as the perfect killer as he showed no emotional weaknesses. This changes when he falls in love with a girl named Jang Mi while trying to protect her as part of his contract.

== Publications ==
- Go Yeong-hun, Trace 1 by Pop Toon on April 15, 2008 ISBN 978-89-93208-03-0
- Go Yeong-hun, Trace 2 by Pop Toon on May 15, 2008 ISBN 89-93208-04-2
- Go Yeong-hun, Trace 3 by Pop Toon on December 15, 2008 ISBN 89-93208-20-4
- Go Yeong-hun, Trace 4 by Pop Toon on July 10, 2009 ISBN 978-89-93208-40-5
