= Trace Creek (Cub Creek tributary) =

Stream in the American state of Missouri

Coordinates: 37.778379°N 91.009855°W

Trace Creek is a stream in Washington County in the U.S. state of Missouri. It is a tributary of Cub Creek.

Trace Creek most likely was so named on account of a trail near its course.

== See also ==
- List of rivers of Missouri
