= 1922–23 WPI Engineers men's basketball team =

American college basketball season

1922–23 WPI Engineers men's basketball
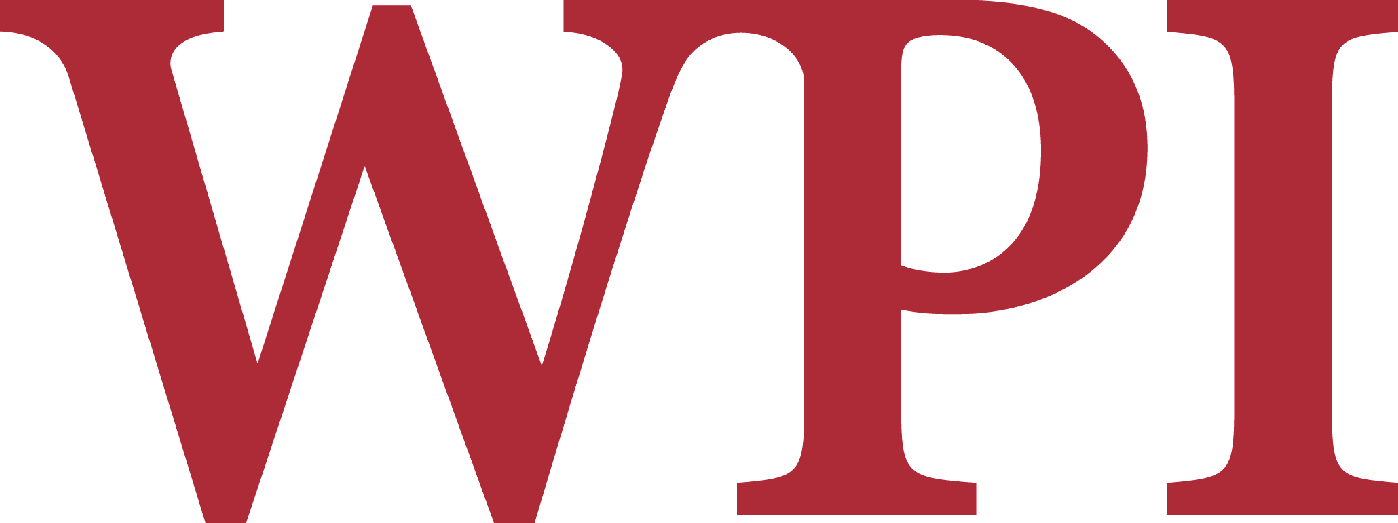
- Conference: Independent
- Record: 6-8
- Head coach: Ivan Bigler (2nd season)
- Home arena: Alumni Gym

The 1922–23 WPI Engineers men's basketball team represented Worcester Polytechnic Institute during the 1922–23 NCAA men's basketball season. They were coached by Ivan Bigler. The Engineers played their home games at Alumni Gym in Worcester, Massachusetts. The team finished the season with 6 wins and 8 losses.
