= 1923–24 WPI Engineers men's basketball team =

American college basketball season

1923–24 WPI Engineers men's basketball
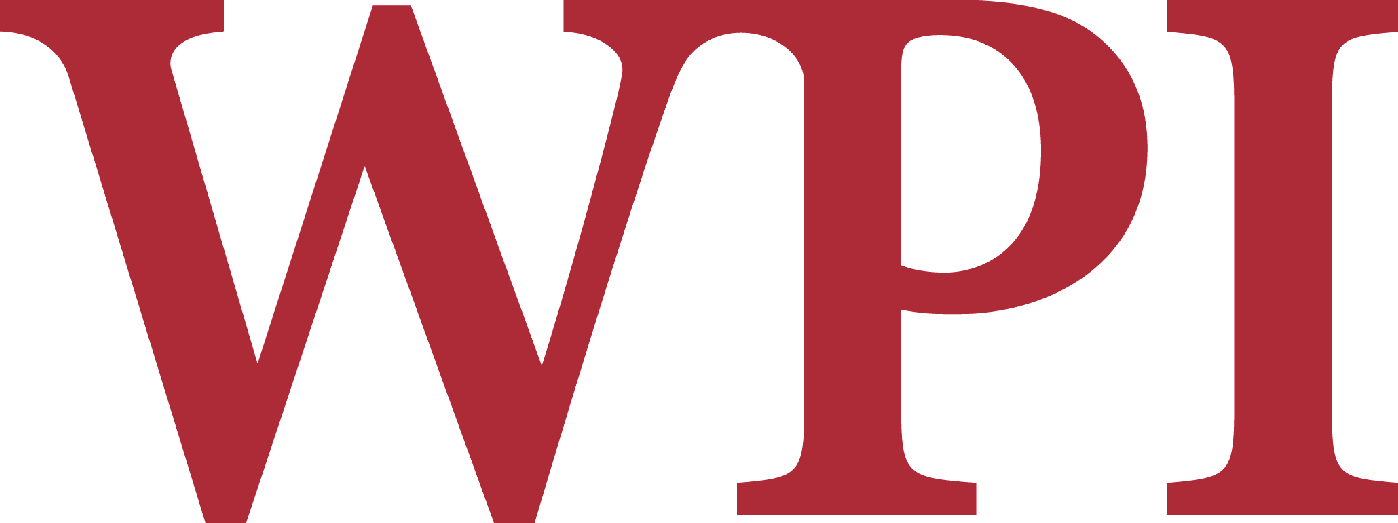
- Conference: Independent
- Record: 4-13
- Head coach: Ivan Bigler (3rd season)
- Home arena: Alumni Gym

The 1923–24 WPI Engineers men's basketball team represented Worcester Polytechnic Institute during the 1923–24 NCAA men's basketball season. They were coached by Ivan Bigler. The Engineers played their home games at Alumni Gym in Worcester, Massachusetts. The team finished the season with 4 wins and 17 losses.
