= 2018–19 WPI Engineers men's basketball team =

American college basketball season

2018–19 WPI Engineers men's basketball
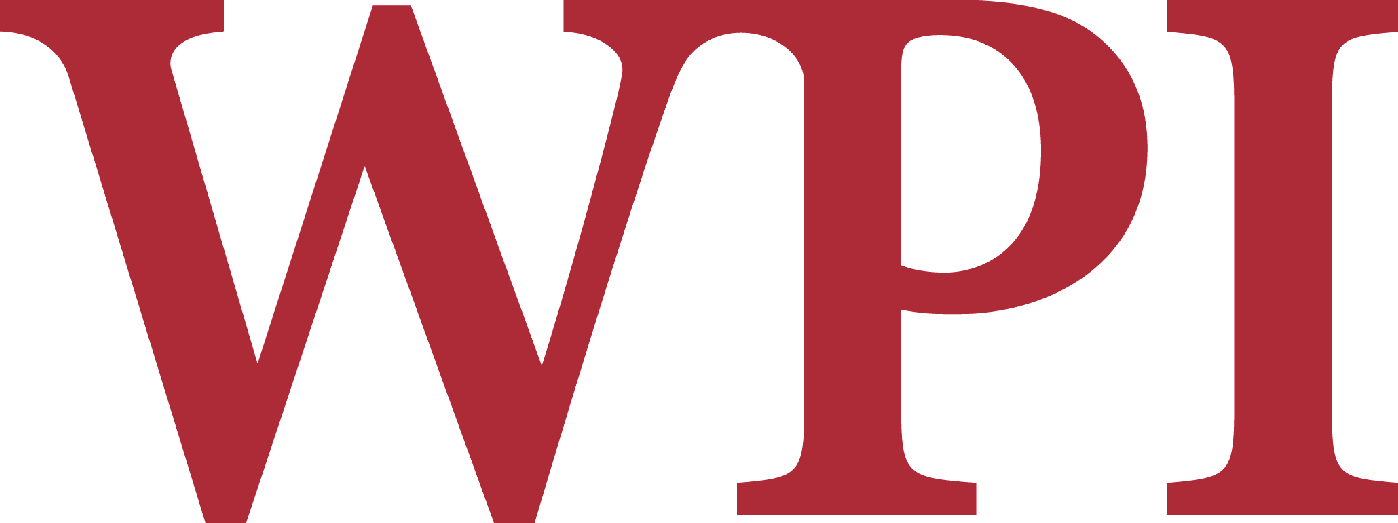
- Conference: New England Women's and Men's Athletic Conference

Ranking
- Coaches: No. NR (D3Hoops.com)
- Record: 19–9 (8–6 NEWMAC)
- Head coach: Chris Bartley (18th season)
- Assistant coaches: Jeff Robinson; David Brown; Ryan Flynn; Scott Mulloy
- Home arena: Harrington Auditorium

The 2018–19 WPI Engineers men's basketball team represented Worcester Polytechnic Institute during the 2018–19 NCAA Division III men's basketball season. The Engineers, led by 18th-year head coach Chris Bartley, played their home games at Harrington Auditorium in Worcester, Massachusetts as members of the New England Women's and Men's Athletic Conference (NEWMAC). They finished the regular season 19–9, 8–6 in the NEWMAC play, to finish in fifth place. They lost in the championship game of the NEWMAC tournament for the second consecutive year.

== Previous season ==
The Engineers finished the 2017–18 season 16–11, 8–6 in NEWMAC play, to finish in fourth place. In the NEWMAC tournament, they lost to the MIT in the championship game and failed to qualify for the 2018 NCAA Division III men's basketball tournament.

== Schedule ==
Date time, TV	Rank^{#}	Opponent^{#}	Result	Record	Site (attendance) city, state
Regular season
11/13/2018*; 7:00 p.m.		Albertus Magnus	W 106–82	1–0 (0–0)	Harrington Auditorium (500); Worcester, MA
11/16/2018*; 5:30 p.m.		SUNY Potsdam; Ted Coghlin Memorial Tournament	W 86–71	2–0 (0–0)	Harrington Auditorium (300); Worcester, MA
11/17/2018*; 3:00 p.m.		William Paterson; Ted Coghlin Memorial Tournament	W 65–57	3–0 (0–0)	Harrington Auditorium (400); Worcester, MA
11/20/2018*; 5:33 p.m.		Worcester State	W 90–71	4–0 (0–0)	Harrington Auditorium (300); Worcester, MA
11/27/2018*; 7:00 p.m.		at Tufts	W 89–66	5–0 (0–0)	Cousens Gym (143); Medford, MA
12/01/2018*; 12:00 p.m.		at Fitchburg State	W 63–56	6–0 (0–0)	Recreation Center (70); Fitchburg, MA
12/04/2018*; 6:00 p.m.		at Framingham State	W 70–61	7–0 (0–0)	Athletic and Recreation Center (278); Framingham, MA
12/16/2018*; 1:00 p.m.		Husson	W 86–71	8–0 (0–0)	Harrington Auditorium (300); Worcester, MA
12/29/2018*; 7:00 p.m.		vs. Maryville; Tampa Bay Shootout	L 60–67	8–1 (0–0)	Tampa Prep (40); Tampa, FL
12/30/2018*; 1:00 p.m.		vs. DePauw; Tampa Bay Shootout	L 73–77	8–2 (0–0)	Tampa Prep (40); Tampa, FL
01/02/2019; 6:00 p.m.	No. 7	at MIT	L 44–74	9–3 (0–1)	Rockwell Cage (225); Cambridge, MA
01/5/2019; 2:00 p.m.		at Babson	L 60–64	9–4 (0–2)	Staake Gymnasium (452); Wellesley, MA
01/09/2019; 7:00 p.m.		Wheaton	W 70–46	10–4 (1–2)	Harrington Auditorium (300); Worcester, MA
01/12/2017; 2:00 p.m.		Coast Guard	W 71–68	11–4 (2–2)	Harrington Auditorium (500); Worcester, MA
01/16/2019; 8:00 p.m.		Emerson	W 65–63	12–4 (3–2)	Harrington Auditorium (400); Worcester, MA
01/19/2019; 3:00 p.m.		at Clark	W 74–60	13–4 (4–2)	George F. Kneller Athletics Center (373); Worcester, MA
01/23/2019; 7:00 p.m.		Springfield	W 79–66	14–4 (5–2)	Harrington Auditorium (300); Worcester, MA
01/26/2019; 3:00 p.m.		at Wheaton	W 71–58	15–4 (6–2)	Emerson Gymnasium (234); Norton, MA
01/30/2019; 7:00 p.m.		Clark	W 79–55	16–4 (7–2)	Harrington Auditorium (400); Worcester, MA
02/02/2019; 1:00 p.m.		at Coast Guard	L 58–73	16–5 (7–3)	Roland Hall (252); New London, CT
02/06/2019; 8:00 p.m.		Babson	W 70–61	17–5 (8–3)	Harrington Auditorium (400); Worcester, MA
02/09/2019; 1:00 p.m.		at Emerson	L 70–73	17–6 (8–4)	Bobbi Brown and Steven Plofker Gym (200); Boston, MA
02/13/2019; 7:00 p.m.		at Springfield	L 67–74	17–7 (8–5)	Blake Arena (450); Springfield, MA
02/16/2019; 1:00 p.m.		No. 8 MIT	L 81–84	17–8 (8–6)	Harrington Auditorium (1,100); Worcester, MA
NEWMAC men's tournament
02/19/2019*; 7:00 p.m.		at Babson (4); NEWMAC quarterfinals	W 55–53	18–8 (8–6)	Staake Gymnasium (708); Wellesley, MA
02/21/2019*; 7:00 p.m.		at No. 7 MIT (1); NEWMAC semifinals	W 55–53	19–8 (8–6)	Rockwell Cage (615); Cambridge, MA
02/23/2019*; 1:00 p.m.		at Emerson (2); NEWMAC championship	L 75–93	19–9 (8–6)	Bobbi Brown and Steven Plofker Gym (350); Boston, MA
*Non-conference game. ^{#}Rankings from D3hoops.com. (#) Tournament seedings in parentheses. All times are in Eastern.
