= 2016–17 WPI Engineers men's basketball team =

American college basketball season

2016–17 WPI Engineers men's basketball
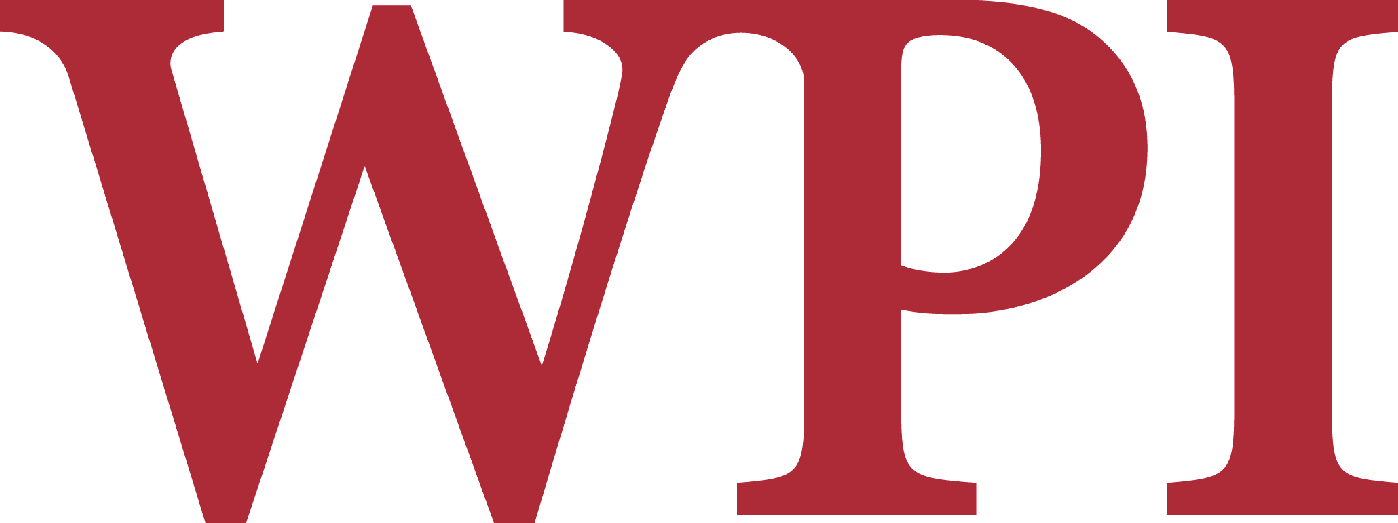
- Conference: New England Women's and Men's Athletic Conference

Ranking
- Coaches: No. NR (D3Hoops.com)
- Record: 17–9 (8–6 NEWMAC)
- Head coach: Chris Bartley (16th season)
- Assistant coaches: Ryan Flynn; Ryan Sheehan
- Home arena: Harrington Auditorium

The 2016–17 WPI Engineers men's basketball team represented Worcester Polytechnic Institute during the 2016–17 NCAA Division III men's basketball season. They were coached by a 19-year coaching veteran, Chris Bartely. The Engineers played their home games at Harrington Auditorium in Worcester, Massachusetts and were a part of the New England Women's and Men's Athletic Conference (NEWMAC). The Engineers finished the regular season with a 17–9 record and lost 61–63 to MIT in the Semifinal round of the NEWMAC Tournament.

== Previous season ==
WPI received an at-large bid to the 2016 NCAA Men's Division III basketball tournament. The Engineers lost in the first round to the SUNY Cortland Red Dragons, 50–69.

== Schedule ==
Date time, TV	Rank^{#}	Opponent^{#}	Result	Record	Site (attendance) city, state
Regular season
11/15/2016*; 5:30 pm		Eastern Connecticut	W 76–62	1–0 (0–0)	Harrington Auditorium (400); Worcester, MA
11/18/2016*; 5:30 pm		Salve Regina; Ted Coghlin Memorial Tournament	W 59–55	2–0 (0–0)	Harrington Auditorium (500); Worcester, MA
11/19/2016*; 3:00 pm		DeSales; Ted Coghlin Memorial Tournament	W 73–70 ^{OT}	3–0 (0–0)	Harrington Auditorium (500); Worcester, MA
11/22/2016*; 5:30 pm		at Worcester State	W 91–54	4–0 (0–0)	Worcester State Lancer Gym (400); Worcester, MA
11/29/2016*; 7:00 pm	No. 23	at No. 3 Tufts	L 71–75	4–1 (0–0)	Cousens Gym (167); Medford, MA
12/01/2016*; 6:00 pm	No. 23	at Framingham State	W 69–52	5–1 (0–0)	Athletic and Recreation Center (150); Framingham, MA
12/03/2016*; 1:00 pm	No. 23	at Fitchburg State	L 61–74	5–2 (0–0)	Recreation Center (125); Fitchburg, MA
12/06/2016*; 7:00 pm		MCLA	W 105–68	6–2 (0–0)	Harrington Auditorium (500); Worcester, MA
12/10/2016*; 1:00 pm		at Salem State	W 87–62	7–2 (0–0)	Twohig Gymnasium (336); Salem, MA
12/28/2016*; 6:00 pm		Keene State	W 72–67	8–2 (0–0)	Harrington Auditorium (500); Worcester, MA
12/30/2016*; 2:00 pm		Eastern Nazarene	W 88–72	9–2 (0–0)	Harrington Auditorium (300); Worcester, MA
01/04/2017; 5:00 pm		Springfield	L 63–71	9–3 (0–1)	Harrington Auditorium (300); Worcester, MA
01/07/2017; 3:00 pm		at MIT	L 63–75	9–4 (0–2)	Rockwell Cage (75); Cambridge, MA
01/11/2017; 7:00 pm		at Babson	L 59–65	9–5 (0–3)	Staake Gymnasium (225); Wellesley, MA
01/14/2017; 2:00 pm		Emerson	W 86–64	10–5 (1–3)	Harrington Auditorium (400); Worcester, MA
01/18/2017; 5:00 pm, Charter TV3		at Clark	W 78–58	11–5 (2–3)	George F. Kneller Athletics Center (1,322); Worcester, MA
01/21/2017; 2:00 pm		Wheaton	W 88–83	12–5 (3–3)	Harrington Auditorium (300); Worcester, MA
01/25/2017; 7:00 pm		Coast Guard	W 84–70	13–5 (4–3)	Harrington Auditorium (400); Worcester, MA
01/28/2017; 12:00 pm		at Springfield	L 70–73	13–6 (4–4)	Blake Arena (540); Springfield, MA
02/01/2017; 5:30 pm		at Emerson	W 62–61	14–6 (5–4)	Bobbi Brown and Steven Plofker Gym (100); Boston, MA
02/04/2017; 2:00 pm		No. 1 Babson	L 45–62	14–7 (5–5)	Harrington Auditorium (1,000); Worcester, MA
02/08/2017; 5:00 pm		MIT	L 66–68 ^{OT}	14–8 (5–6)	Harrington Auditorium (1,000); Worcester, MA
02/11/2017; 3:00 pm		at Coast Guard	W 71–67	15–8 (6–6)	Roland Hall (350); New London, CT
02/15/2017; 7:00 pm		at Wheaton	W 79–67	16–8 (7–6)	Emerson Gymnasium (189); Norton, MA
02/18/2017; 3:00 pm		Clark	W 75–64	17–8 (8–6)	Harrington Auditorium (600); Worcester, MA
NEWMAC men's tournament
02/25/17*; 7:30 pm		vs. MIT; NEWMAC Semifinals	L 61–63	17–9 (8–6)	Staake Gymnasium (575); Wellesley, MA
*Non-conference game. ^{#}Rankings from D3hoops.com. (#) Tournament seedings in parentheses. All times are in Eastern Time.
