= 2014–15 WPI Engineers men's basketball team =

American college basketball season

2014–15 WPI Engineers men's basketball
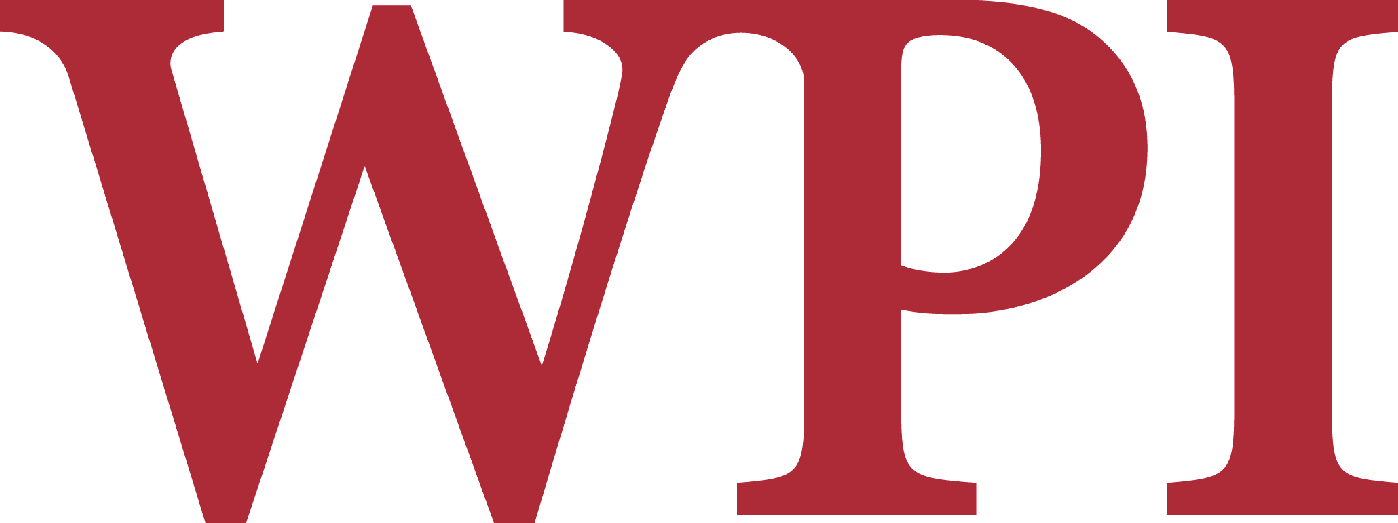

NCAA tournament, First round
- Conference: New England Women's and Men's Athletic Conference
- Record: 21-6 (11-3 NEWMAC)
- Head coach: Chris Bartley (14th season)
- Home arena: Harrington Auditorium

The 2014–15 WPI Engineers men's basketball team represented Worcester Polytechnic Institute during the 2014–15 NCAA Division III men's basketball season. They were coached by a 17-year coaching veteran, Chris Bartely. The Engineers played their home games at Harrington Auditorium in Worcester, Massachusetts and were a part of the New England Women's and Men's Athletic Conference.
