= 2015–16 WPI Engineers men's basketball team =

American college basketball season

2015–16 WPI Engineers men's basketball
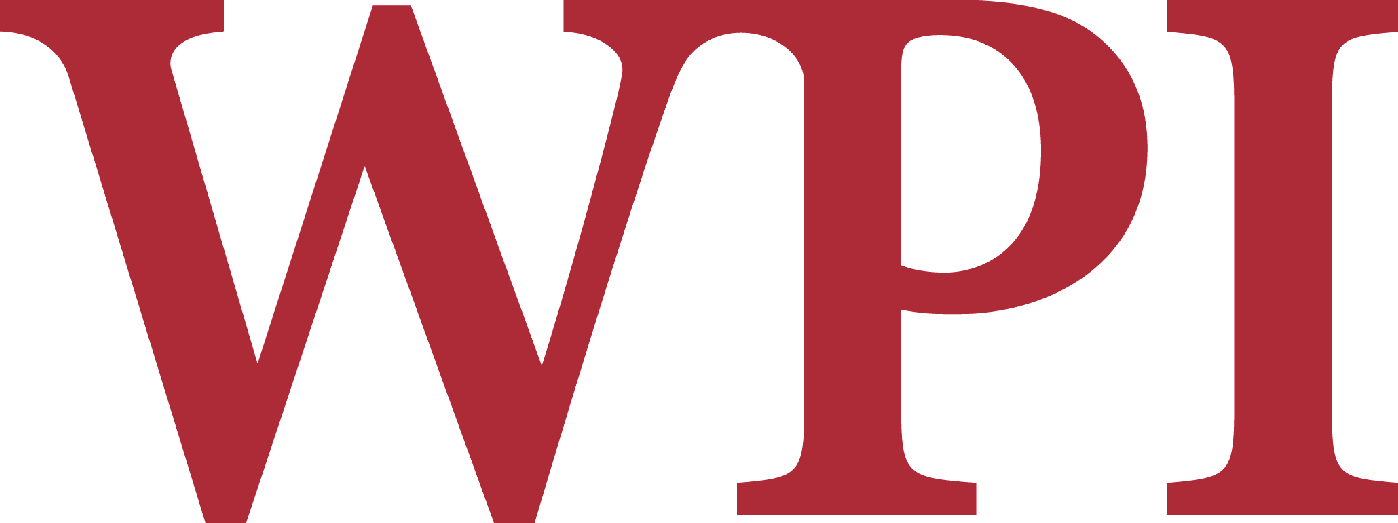

NCAA tournament, First round
- Conference: New England Women's and Men's Athletic Conference
- Record: 20–7 (10–4 NEWMAC)
- Head coach: Chris Bartley (15th season)
- Home arena: Harrington Auditorium

The 2015–16 WPI Engineers men's basketball team represented Worcester Polytechnic Institute during the 2015–16 NCAA Division III men's basketball season. They were coached by an 18-year coaching veteran, Chris Bartely. The Engineers played their home games at Harrington Auditorium in Worcester, Massachusetts and were a part of the New England Women's and Men's Athletic Conference.
