= 1920–21 WPI Engineers men's basketball team =

American college basketball season

1920–21 WPI Engineers men's basketball
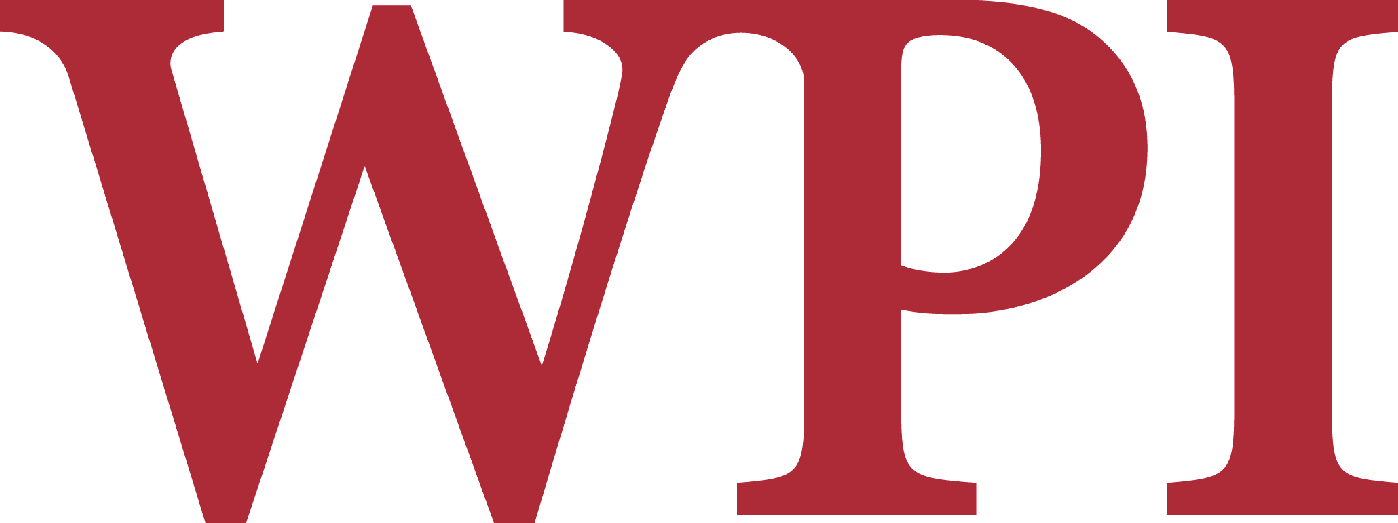

New England Champions
- Conference: Independent
- Record: 15-3
- Head coach: Henry C. Swasey (4th season)
- Captain: Fred Pickwick Jr.
- Home arena: Alumni Gym

The 1920–21 WPI Engineers men's basketball team represented Worcester Polytechnic Institute during the 1920–21 NCAA men's basketball season. They were coached by Henry C. Swasey. The Engineers played their home games at Alumni Gym in Worcester, Massachusetts. The team won its second consecutive New England Championship and finished the season with 15 wins and 3 losses.
