= Northwestern National Life Insurance Company Home Office =

- U.S. National Register of Historic Places
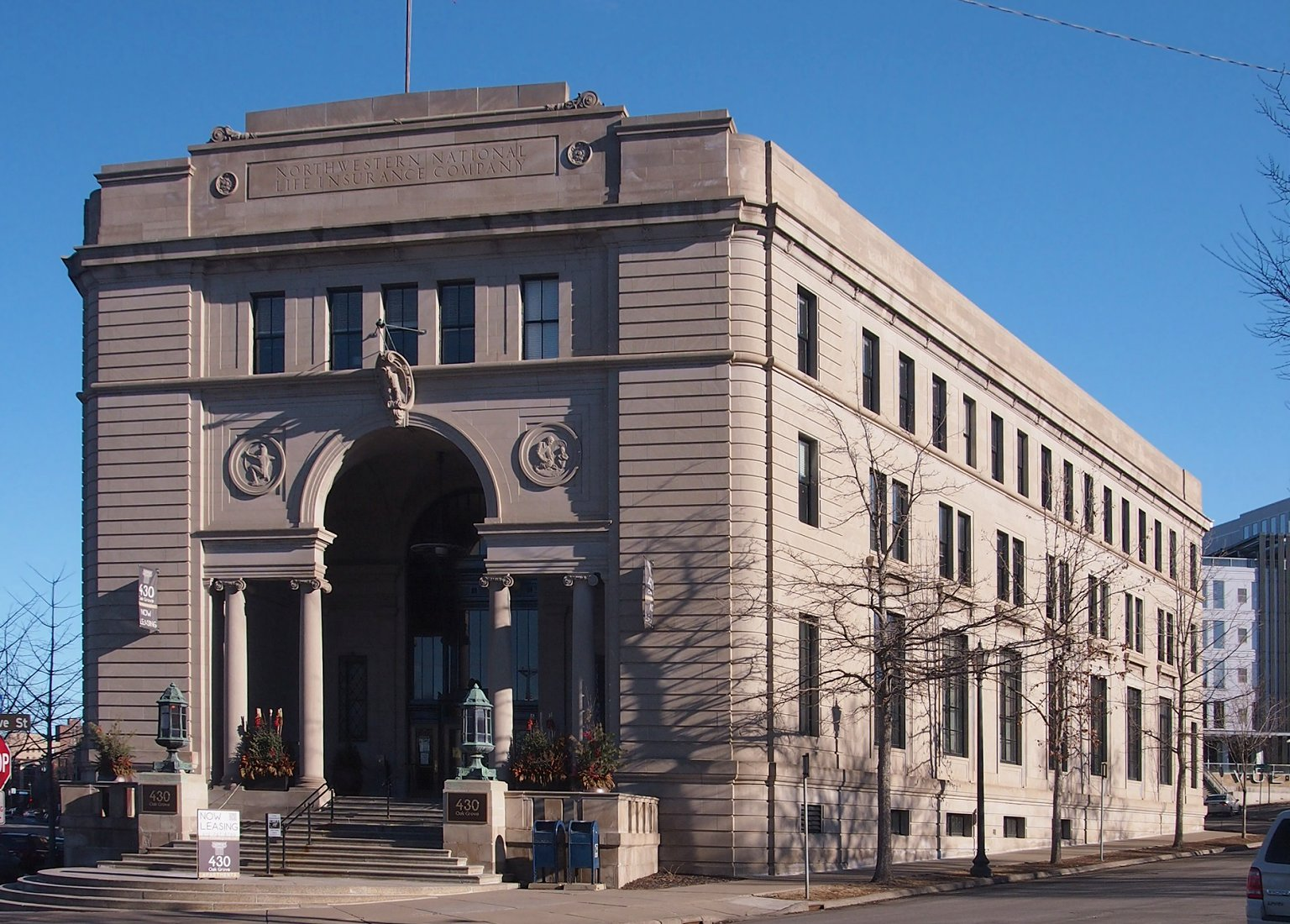
- The Northwestern National Life Insurance Company Home Office from the northwest

- Location within Minnesota Location within the United States
- Location: 430 Oak Grove St., Minneapolis, Minnesota
- Coordinates: 44°58′5″N 93°17′9″W
- Area: less than one acre
- Built: 1924
- Architect: Hewitt and Brown
- Architectural style: Beaux-Arts
- NRHP reference No.: 12000414
- Added to NRHP: July 16, 2012

The Northwestern National Life Insurance Company Home Office, was also known as the Loring Park Office Building, and is now a 75 unit boutique apartment complex known as 430 Oak Grove located in Minneapolis, Minnesota. It was designed by the architecture firm of Hewitt and Brown in the Beaux-Arts style as the headquarters of the Northwestern National Life Insurance Company. The building was listed on the National Register of Historic Places on July 16, 2012.

== Description ==
The building faces Loring Park on the north and is surrounded by residential buildings to the south, St. Mark's Episcopal Cathedral to the west, and the Woman's Club of Minneapolis on the east. It has a reinforced concrete structure and is faced with gray Bedford limestone and brick. The front entrance has a Palladian loggia style, with a tall archway flanked by Ionic columns and a porch behind it.

== History ==
The building is significant for its architecture and also for its role in the commerce of Minnesota. The company was established in 1885, and was originally named the "Northwestern Aid Association". It became the Northwestern Life Association in 1888.

In 1901, the company's president, William Frank Bechtel, merged the Northwestern Life Association and the National Mutual Life Association into the Northwestern National Life Insurance Company. It was the second-largest life insurance company in the American Midwest after the Northwestern Mutual company in Milwaukee.

The company built a headquarters building at 11th and Nicollet, combined with an auditorium for public use, in 1905. As the company grew, though, that building was no longer large enough for its staff or for efficient operations. The company accepted a purchase offer in December 1919 for its Nicollet Avenue property, and in 1920, they purchased three lots near Loring Park.

In August 1922, the board of directors authorized construction of the headquarters. They searched for a suitable architect, and contracted with the firm of Hewitt & Brown. Hewitt & Brown had designed two nearby buildings: St. Mark's Episcopal Cathedral and the Hennepin Avenue United Methodist Church a block away. Plans were approved in January 1923, with revisions continuing through September of that year. The site had an odd shape because of the street intersection on which it faced, and Hewitt considered it an "interesting problem". He chose the terrace and the loggia as a solution to the grade on which the building faced, and it gave the building a monumental effect. Ground was broken for the building on March 1, 1923. Construction was finished the next year, with the first tenants arriving in January 1924 and with the move complete on March 15, 1924.

The company's growth accelerated during and after World War II. In 1946 the office building was completely full, so they built an annex onto their Oak Grove location. The company continued to expand, though, so in 1949 they purchased land on the east side of Bde Maka Ska between 35th and 36th Streets South. The neighborhood objected to the possibility of a business locating in a residential area, though. The company continued to expand, so by December 1964, the staff had employees scattered across five locations.

Meanwhile, competing companies and other businesses in Downtown Minneapolis were moving to the edges of downtown or to the suburbs as downtown deteriorated. The city demolished 40% of the Gateway District in an urban renewal project. Northwestern National Life announced plans to build their new headquarters in the Gateway District at the intersection of Hennepin, Nicollet, and Washington Avenues. The new Northwestern National Life Building was designed by Minoru Yamasaki and was opened in 1964.

The Loring Park building was renamed the "Loring Park Office Building" in 1966 and was subdivided to house a number of businesses.

A little know fact about the building, in 1977, the world renowned (and Minnesota native) artist Prince recorded The Loring Park Sessions in his managers office, which was located on the first floor of the building. In 2017, multiple members involved in the recording session returned to the building and a plaque was hung.

In 2011, Kraus Anderson purchased the building and spent 20 million dollars converting it from offices into luxury apartments, which opened in 2012.

== See also ==
- National Register of Historic Places listings in Hennepin County, Minnesota
