= Eugene J. Carpenter House =

Historic house in Minnesota, United States

- U.S. National Register of Historic Places
- Minneapolis Landmark
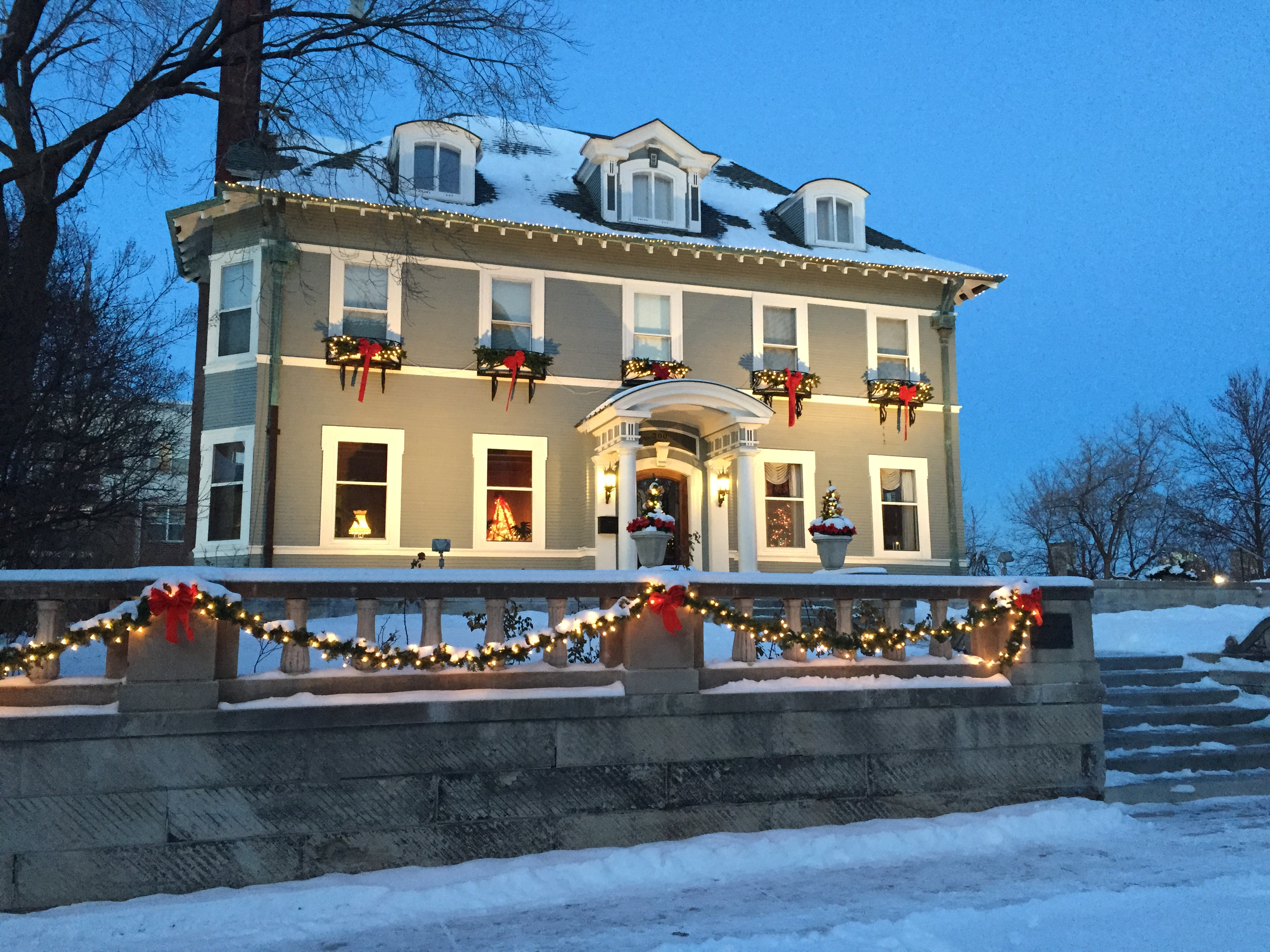
- The Eugene J. Carpenter House decorated for Christmas

- Location within Minnesota Location within the United States
- Location: 300 Clifton Avenue, Minneapolis, Minnesota
- Coordinates: 44°57′58.3″N 93°17′0″W
- Built: 1887
- Architect: Edwin Hawley Hewitt
- Architectural style: Georgian Variation of Colonial Revival
- NRHP reference No.: 77001566

Significant dates
- Added to NRHP: September 13, 1977
- Designated MPLSL: 1978

The Eugene J. Carpenter House is a Georgian Revival-style house located in Loring Hills, the mansion district in turn-of-the-century Minneapolis, Minnesota, United States.

The house was built in 1887 by C.M Douglas, who owned a coal delivery business. 300 Clifton was built in the Queen Anne style, with prominent porches and a turret in the southeast. Harvey Brown, a successful businessman and banker bought the house in 1890 and lived there until his death in 1904.

The house was purchased in 1905 by Eugene and Merrette Carpenter and was owned by the family until 1948. This constitutes the historically significant time period. Eugene Carpenter and Merrette Lamb came from lumber milling families and were owners of the Carpenter-Lamb Lumber Co. of Minneapolis. The Carpenters were also significant patrons of the arts and Eugene Carpenter played a pivotal role in establishing the Minneapolis Institute of Arts.

== Renovation ==
After purchasing the house in November 1905, the Carpenters hired a young and promising architect, Edwin Hawley Hewitt, who had recently finished his schooling in Paris. The task was daunting. Hewitt was asked to turn the Victorian style house into a Georgian Revival style house. “About as different as can be,” said Olivia (Carpenter) Coan who was 9 years old in 1906 during the renovation.

Hewitt removed the roof, moved fireplaces, built additional foundations, moved interior and exterior walls and rebuilt the carriage house from the foundation up all in time for the family to move in by September 1906, 10 months after the purchase.

The house features some remarkable architectural designs implemented by Hewitt. The French drain was invented in 1885, and Hewitt brought the concept back to Minneapolis and implemented it throughout the grounds. Johnson Controls had recently patented a revolutionary thermostat that allowed for temperature control, room to room. The Carpenters included this pneumatic system in their house. Hewitt designed an effective passive cooling system for the house which made use of massive concrete porches to moderate the temperatures inside the house.

John S Bradstreet, a prominent Minneapolis designer, did the interior design of the house. Bradstreet collaborated with Hewitt and Carpenter to bring Arts and Crafts style to the house.

== Description ==
300 Clifton faces south towards Clifton Ave, has 14 bedrooms, 11 bathrooms and sits on a one-acre double lot. The north edge of the property is bordered by a low bluff which forms the foundation of the 6500 square foot carriage house. The main house is 12,000 square feet. All three of the original fireplaces are still functional. A focal point of the house is the gardens to the east.

== Historical significance ==
Carpenter, Hewitt, and Bradstreet developed a friendship through their work on the 300 Clifton project and continued their friendship through the establishment of the Minneapolis Institute of Arts.

Bradstreet was the president of the floundering Minneapolis Society of Fine Art when he invited Carpenter to come aboard to help the group realize its ultimate goal of creating an Art Museum for Minneapolis. Carpenter was a marketing, promoting and financing genius. In 1911, Carpenter as the new president of the Minneapolis Society of Fine Art organized an art show and personally invited 400 prominent businessmen to a private viewing. Every recipient attended. From this, Carpenter began his campaign to build a publicly funded museum in a manner that had never been done before. Carpenter secured a donation of land worth $250,000 and used this to electrify the many businessmen to donate to his new cause. In a single fund raising dinner, Carpenter hosted 200 local businessmen and received pledges for over a half million dollars.

The edifice was funded and built in 1915. With Hewitt as president and Carpenter as Vice-President of the new museum, their work had just begun. The Minneapolis Art Society only owned 12 objects of art. For the rest of his life, Carpenter worked to excite and motivate the people of Minneapolis to become patrons of the arts. He encouraged corporations to donate and for well heeled businessmen to learn about art and purchase art around the world. Today the MIA houses over 80,000 pieces of art.

== 300 Clifton as a multi-unit building ==
The Carpenter family sold the house after Merrette's death in 1946. The Mack family purchased the 300 Clifton and subdivided the house into several smaller living units. While the Mack family owned the house from 1946 to 1963, the house was kept impeccably in keeping with the other homes in the mansion district.

=== Families of note during the 1950s and 1960s ===
Several prominent families resided at the high-end 300 Clifton living spaces throughout the 1950s and 1960s.

- John Warner, the President of Hanna Coal Company, lived at 300 Clifton for many years in the 1950s.
- Forest Selvig, a primary curator at the Walker and then a director at Minneapolis Institute of Arts lived in the carriage house flat for many years in the same decade.
- Richard Heiny and David V Peterson who were the primary designers at LaVoy's, a preeminent Minneapolis design firm, also lived at 300 Clifton.
- Attorney Emerson Hopp lived at 300 Clifton for many years. Hopp is famous for representing the Oglala Sioux tribe in several treaty disputes which include the land of the Twin Cities and the bottom third of Minnesota. Hopp won 20 million dollars in settlements in favor of the tribes he represented.
- Oscar-winning actress Jessica Tandy and her husband Hume Cronyn lived in the house while they were in Minneapolis for the inaugural season of the Guthrie in 1963.

In the 1960s the Mack family sold the house to the Klein brothers who decided to demolish the old house as it fell into significant disrepair. It is unclear how the house escaped the wrecking ball at that time.

== 300 Clifton as an office ==
In 1973 David Beide saved the house in more ways than one. First he repurposed the troubled property into an office building. Beide also owned 314 Clifton Ave, the Elbert L Carpenter house next door. Together he called the two properties Clifton Court. Second, Beide accomplished listing both of the properties on the National Historic Register, protecting them in perpetuity.

Beide transferred the property to his friend and tenant Bill Urseth who developed the property tremendously over the next decade. Urseth built a new building at 310 Clifton between the two Carpenter homes. Among all three buildings, Clifton Court at that time housed 150 employees.

After Urseth sold in 1993, 300 Clifton remained an office for twenty more years, but fell into considerable disrepair. Neighbors behind 300 Clifton on Oak Grove were forced to paint the house and rebuild the 20-foot (6.1 m) retaining wall that was crumbling onto their property. The Loring neighborhood group (Citizens for a Loring Park Community), invested $30,000 to fix the roof in order to save the historic structure. Today the house is a Bed and Breakfast called 300 Clifton Bed and Breakfast.
