= Lumen Technologies Building =

Skyscraper in Minneapolis, Minnesota, US

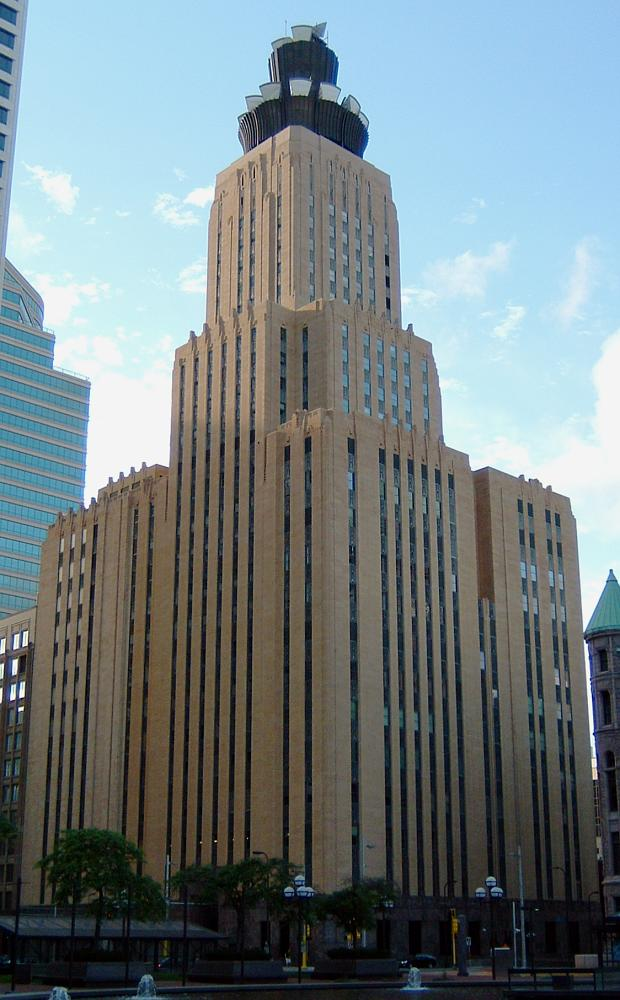
- Southeast view of the building in 2005
- Interactive map of the Lumen Technologies Building area

General information
- Status: Completed
- Architectural style: Art Deco
- Location: Minneapolis, Minnesota, 200 S 5th St
- Coordinates: 44°58′39″N 93°16′0″W
- Completed: 1932
- Opening: 1932
- Owner: Lumen Technologies

Height
- Antenna spire: 416 ft (127 m) (removed)
- Roof: 346 ft (105 m)

Technical details
- Floor count: 26

Design and construction
- Architect: Hewitt and Brown

The Lumen Technologies Building is a 26-story building in Minneapolis, Minnesota, United States. It is named for its current owner, and has been previously known as the CenturyLink Building, Qwest Building, and the Northwestern Bell Telephone Building. Completed in 1932, it stood at 346 feet (105 m) tall until an AT&T communications array was built atop it in the mid 20th century, increasing the structure to 416 feet (127 m) until its removal in 2019.

The building has many small details on the exterior, including electric bolts and a stylized bird above the main entrance. When under construction, an unusual move was made by stripping a 1920s Northwestern Bell building on the site and the steel frame was incorporated into the new structure. The building was expanded on its west side in the 1940s.

== History ==
Telephone service in Minneapolis first began in 1878 with a switchboard located in the old city hall, located in the Gateway area, and serving 11 phones. Demand increased rapidly, and in 1885, the central office had 775 lines and was moved to the second floor of the city hall building. In 1890, the office outgrew its quarters in the city hall, with 1700 lines, so it moved to a building on Fourth Street between Nicollet and Marquette Avenues. Demand increased to 3000 subscribers in 1897, so a three-story building was built at Third Avenue South and Fifth Street. In 1908, two five-story wings were built. Additional central office buildings were established outside downtown Minneapolis. By 1920, there were 96,000 telephones in 14 central office buildings.

In 1920, a nine-story building was built at Third Avenue South and Fifth Street. That building was planned with the possibility that it would be merged into a larger structure. In 1929, with still more expansion, six floors were leased in an outside building. Finally, the current building was built, after a study of future needs. It was decided to add some space for the Minnesota administrative offices of the phone company, in a decision that was both economical and architecturally pleasing.

When built, the building had its business office on the first floor, with space for customers to transact business with the phone company, public telephone booths, and rooms for long-distance calls. The next 12 floors contained telephone equipment, such as long-distance switchboards, other special switchboards, and dial central office equipment for the MAin, ATlantic, and BRidgeport central offices. There were also breakroom facilities and a lunch room for telephone operators who were off duty. The 14th, 25th, and 26th floors were mechanical floors. Finally, a tower on the 15th through 24th floors housed administrative offices of the telephone company. There were also three basement floors with power and heating equipment, along with cable vaults. The building measured 346 feet (105 m) above street level, 42 feet (13 m) in the basements, and had 26 stories. Many of these stories were somewhat taller than those in office buildings due to the size of central office equipment. The building had 24,000 square feet (2,200 m^{2}) of floor space, and housed about 1,000 employees.

Minnesota construction materials were used in the building, with a granite exterior from Morton on the first floor and limestone from Kasota on subsequent stories. Cement from Duluth and steel from the Mesabi Range were used for interior construction. The building was designed by Minnesota architects, built by Minneapolis contractors, and supplied with other materials by Minnesota firms.

Initially, the roof was flat, but various antennas and satellite dishes were installed over the years, totaling 14 by the mid 1960s. In 1967, plans were announced to replace these with a brand new $600,000 microwave antenna "crown". The first half of the new structure was installed in 1968, followed by the second in 1972. It was used for AT&T Long Lines service and built to be able to withstand a nuclear blast. In 2010, the antennas ceased use. A decision was then made to scrap the structure, which had begun to deteriorate, rather than pay the costs to maintain it. In 2019, it was dismantled.

== See also ==
- List of tallest buildings in Minnesota
- List of tallest buildings in Minneapolis
