= Architects and Engineers Building =

- U.S. National Register of Historic Places
- Minneapolis Landmark
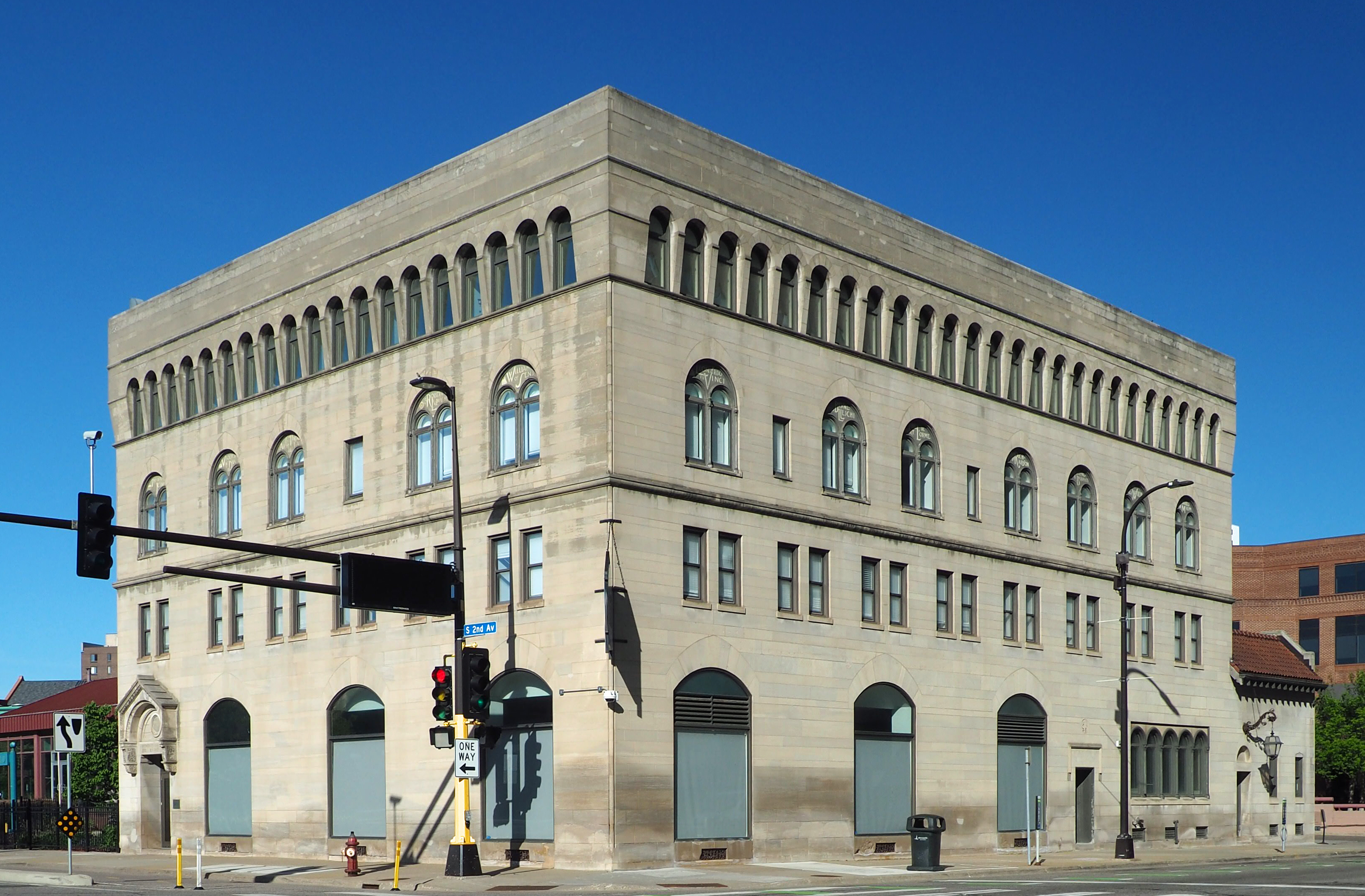
- The Architects and Engineers Building from the east

- Location within Minnesota Location within the United States
- Location: 1200 2nd Ave. S. Minneapolis, Minnesota
- Coordinates: 44°58′15″N 93°16′26.3″W
- Area: Approximately .5 acres (0.20 ha)
- Built: 1920
- Architect: Pike & Cook; Hewitt & Brown
- Architectural style: Italian Renaissance Revival
- NRHP reference No.: 84001414

Significant dates
- Added to NRHP: February 23, 1984
- Designated MPLSL: 1980

The Architects and Engineers Building is an office building in downtown Minneapolis, Minnesota, United States, designed by locally notable architects Hewitt and Brown and built by builders Pike and Cook. The building was influenced by Hewitt and Brown's relationship with designers who were dedicated to the City Beautiful movement. They intended to save money by grouping their practices in one building, and they also desired "the special advantage of proximity and the facility for making the knowledge and experience of each available to others." The building was designed with private executive offices, as well as common drafting rooms, libraries, meeting rooms, and clerical facilities. The building was also intended for use at night by architectural students who would work in association with practicing professionals.

The building is designed with an Italian Renaissance theme, with different window plans on each level. The names of prominent architects such as Leonardo da Vinci, Filippo Brunelleschi, Sir Christopher Wren, Charles Follen McKim, and Henry Hobson Richardson are painted in gold within the arches between each pair of third-floor windows.

The building is listed on the National Register of Historic Places for local significance in architecture and commerce. Ownership and purpose of the building have changed over the years, providing offices for Security Life Insurance Company, IBM, and Catholic Charities Twin Cities.

== See also ==
- National Register of Historic Places listings in Hennepin County, Minnesota
