= Edwin Hawley Hewitt =

American architect (1874–1939)

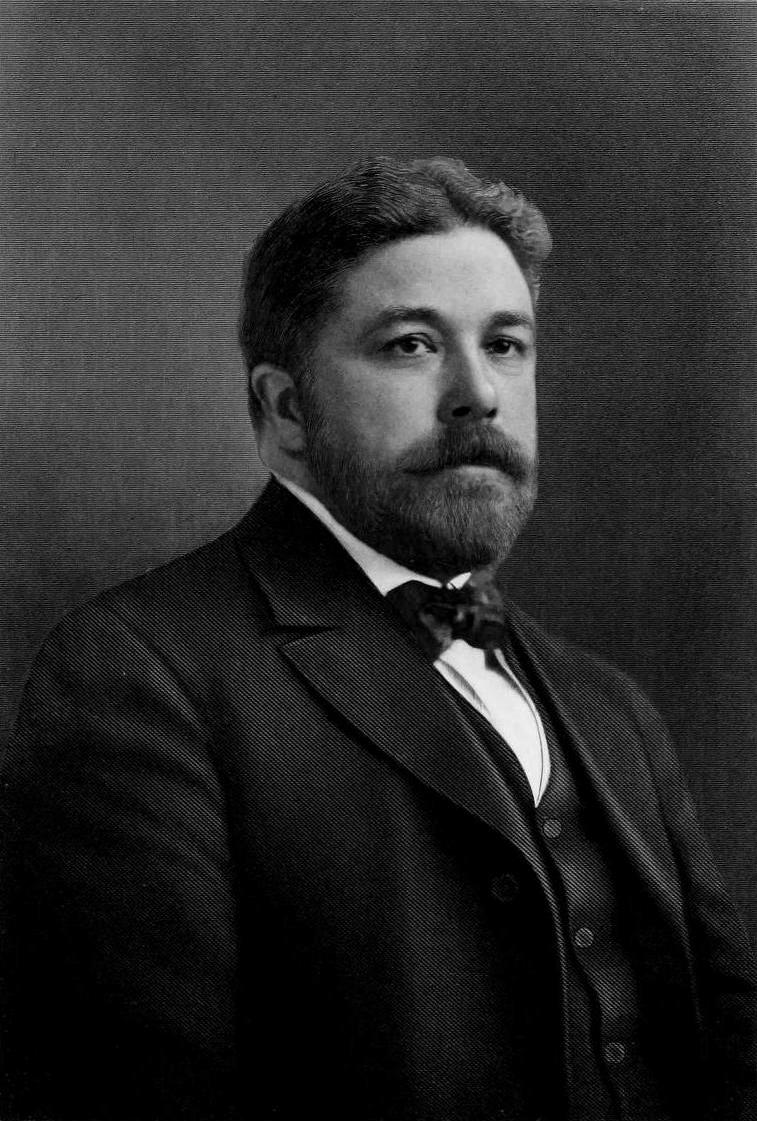
- Hewitt c. 1914
- Born: March 26, 1874; Red Wing, Minnesota, U.S.
- Died: August 11, 1939 (aged 65); Minneapolis, Minnesota
- Occupation: Architect

Edwin Hawley Hewitt (March 26, 1874 – August 11, 1939) was an American architect from Minnesota. In 1906, he designed the Edwin H. Hewitt House in the Stevens Square neighborhood of Minneapolis, listed on the National Register of Historic Places in 1978.

== Life and career ==
Hewitt was born in Red Wing, Minnesota. After a partial course at Hobart College he entered the University of Minnesota in the sophomore class in 1893, graduating with the degree of A.B. in 1896. He then went to the Massachusetts Institute of Technology, where he studied during the winter of 1896–1897. The next three years were spent in the offices of Shepley, Rutan and Coolidge, Wheelwright & Haven, and others. He was married in 1900 and went at once to Paris, where he entered the École nationale supérieure des Beaux-Arts in May, 1901 where he became a member of the Atelier Pascal. In October, 1904, he returned to the United States, but he had completed his work at the Ecole. Arriving in Minneapolis, he was almost immediately offered a commission and at once started in on private practice, not having an opportunity to return to Paris for over eight years. As time went on he realized the importance in architectural work of the allied science of engineering in all its branches, and in September, 1910, he formed a partnership with Edwin H. Brown under the name of Hewitt & Brown, architects and engineers. Hewitt was instrumental in the work which culminated in the completion of the Minneapolis Institute of Arts. He was president of the Minnesota State Art Society. He became a member of the American Institute of Architects in 1913, and was president of the Minnesota Chapter of the American Institute of Architects. The practice of Hewitt and Brown continued until Brown's death in 1930. Hewitt resumed private practice, but as business declined during the Great Depression, he closed his office and became the chief architectural supervisor for the Federal Housing Administration for the Minneapolis area. He died on August 11, 1939.

== Legacy ==
Though their work was concentrated around Minneapolis, Hewitt & Brown are known to have designed buildings in northern Minnesota and in Wisconsin.

Alone or in association with Brown, Hewitt was responsible for the design of a number of buildings which have been listed on the United States National Register of Historic Places.

== Architectural works ==
- House for Josephine Brooks, (Note: An example of Prairie School architecture.) Minneapolis, Minnesota (1905)
- House for Eugene J. Carpenter, Minneapolis, Minnesota (1906, NRHP 1977)
- House for Edwin H. Hewitt, Minneapolis, Minnesota (1906, NRHP 1978)
- Episcopal Cathedral of St. Mark, Minneapolis, Minnesota (1908–11)
- McKnight Building, Minneapolis, Minnesota (1911 and 1913)
- Blake School, Hopkins, Minnesota (1912)
- House for Charles S. Pillsbury, Minneapolis, Minnesota (1912)
- House for John F. Killorin, Duluth, Minnesota (1914)
- Soo Line Building, (Note: As supervising architects for Robert W. Gibson of New York.) Minneapolis, Minnesota (1914–15, NRHP 2008)
- Alumni Gymnasium, Worcester Polytechnic Institute, Worcester, Massachusetts (1915–16, demolished 2016)
- House for Roy Wilcox, Eau Claire, Wisconsin (1915, NRHP 1983)
- Pavilion, Gateway Park, Minneapolis, Minnesota (1915, demolished)
- Hennepin Avenue United Methodist Church, Minneapolis, Minnesota (1916)
- House for Lloyd T. Brown, (Note: Lloyd T. Brown was a younger brother of Edwin H. Brown.) Milton, Massachusetts (1916)
- Main Building, Dunwoody College of Technology, Minneapolis, Minnesota (1916–17 and 1923)
- Metropolitan Bank Building, (Note: Now known as Northstar East.) Minneapolis, Minnesota (1916–17)
- Julia Morrison Memorial Building, Minneapolis College of Art and Design, Minneapolis, Minnesota (1916)
- St. John's Episcopal Church, Minneapolis, Minnesota (1916-16)
- Northrop Collegiate School (former), Minneapolis, Minnesota (1917)
- Woodhill Country Club, Wayzata, Minnesota (1916–17)
- House for George H. Christian, (Note: Now the Hennepin History Museum.) Minneapolis, Minnesota (1919)
- Architects and Engineers Building, Minneapolis, Minnesota (1920, NRHP 1984)
- University Baptist Church, Minneapolis, Minnesota (1920–27)
- Widsten School, (Note: A regionally unusual example of Pueblo Revival architecture.) Wayzata, Minnesota (1921, demolished 1992)
- Virginia Presbyterian Church, Virginia, Minnesota (1922–23)
- Lafayette Club, Minnetonka Beach, Minnesota (1923–24)
- Northwestern National Life Insurance Company Home Office, Minneapolis, Minnesota (1923–24, NRHP 2012)
- Citizens Aid Building, Minneapolis, Minnesota (1926)
- Lake of the Isles Lutheran Church, Minneapolis, Minnesota (1928)
- Fort Snelling Memorial Chapel, Fort Snelling, Minnesota (1929)
- CenturyLink Building, Minneapolis, Minnesota (1932)

== Gallery of architectural works ==
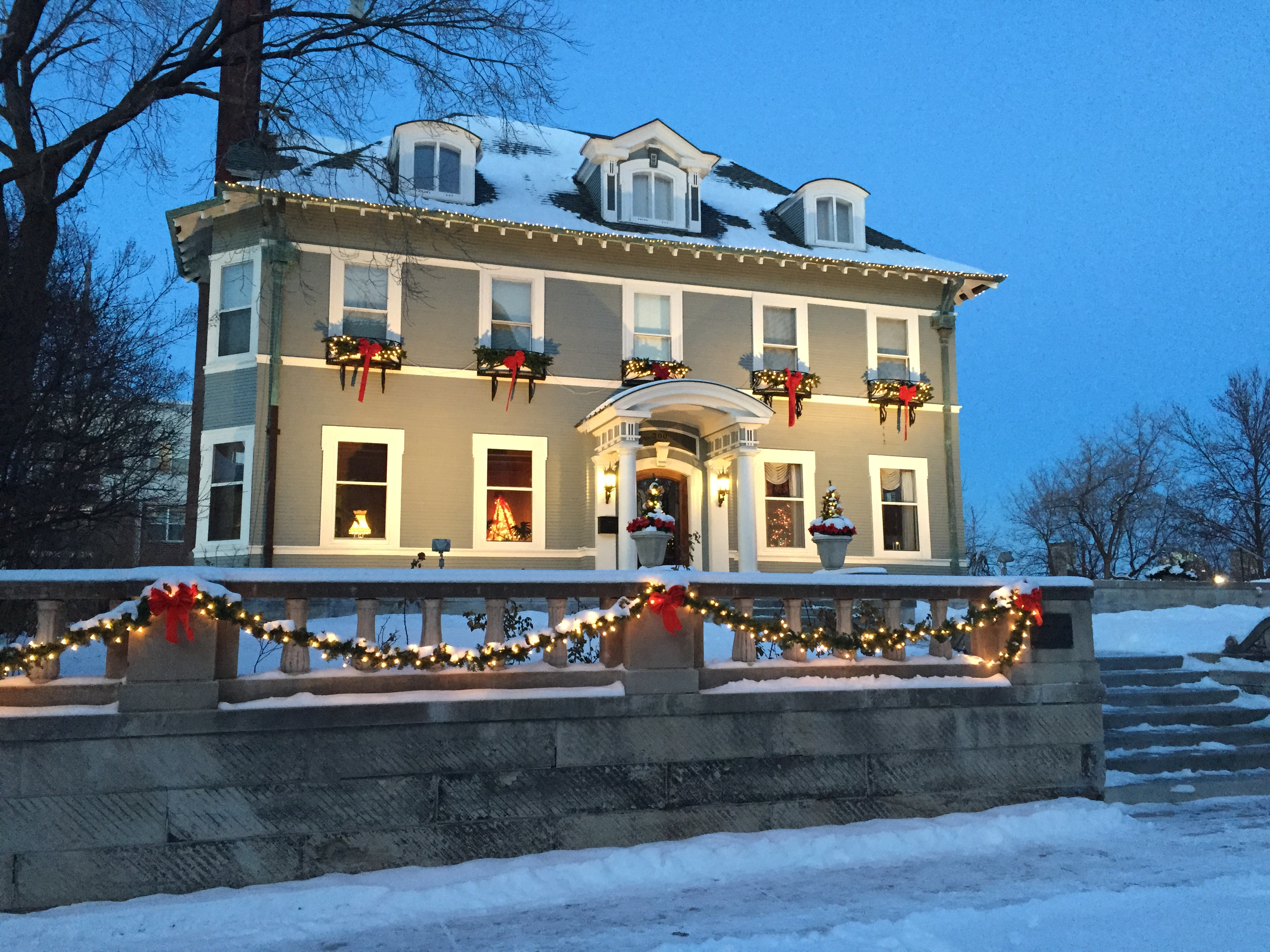
House for Eugene J. Carpenter, Minneapolis, Minnesota, 1906.

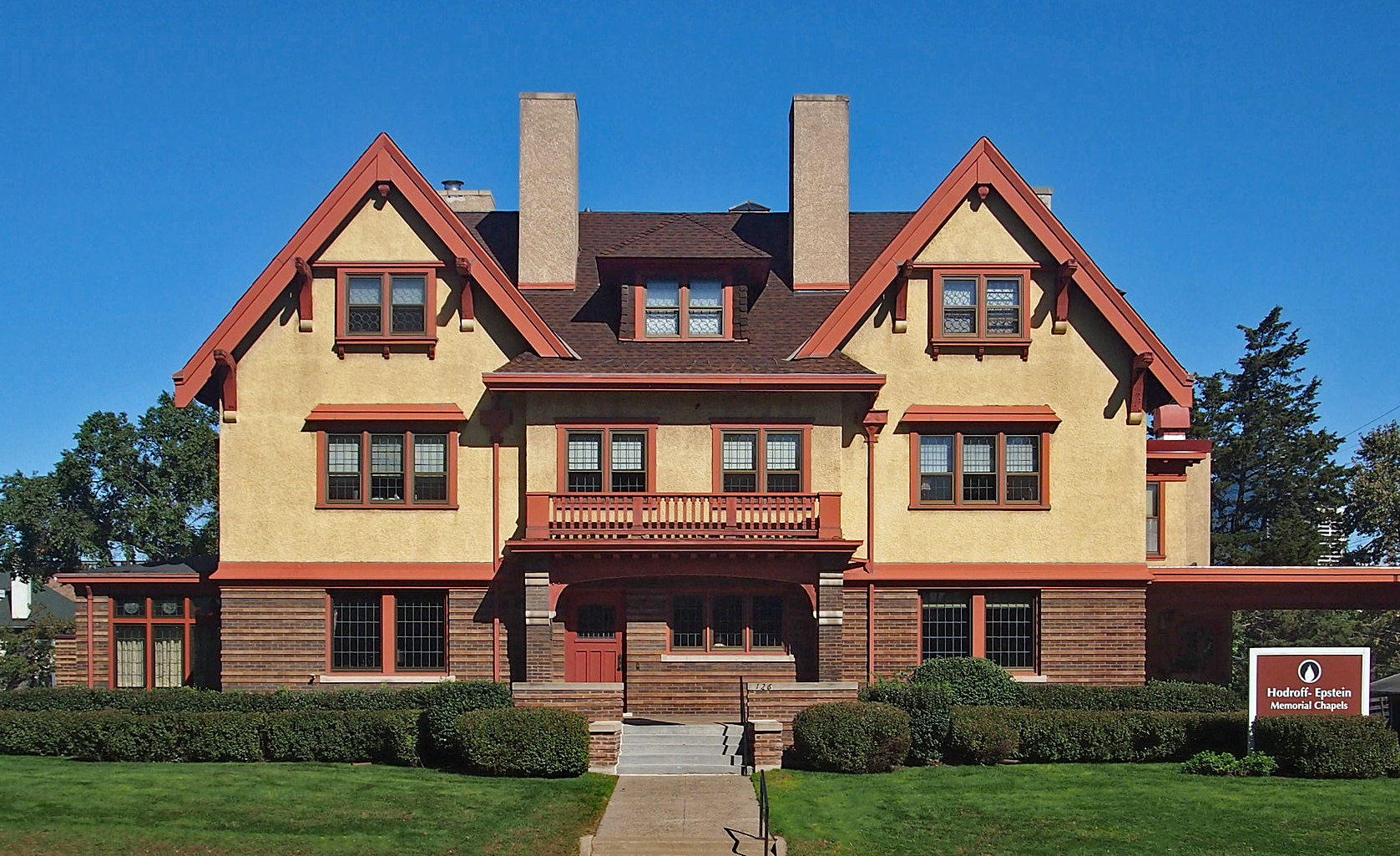
House for Edwin H. Hewitt, Minneapolis, Minnesota, 1906.

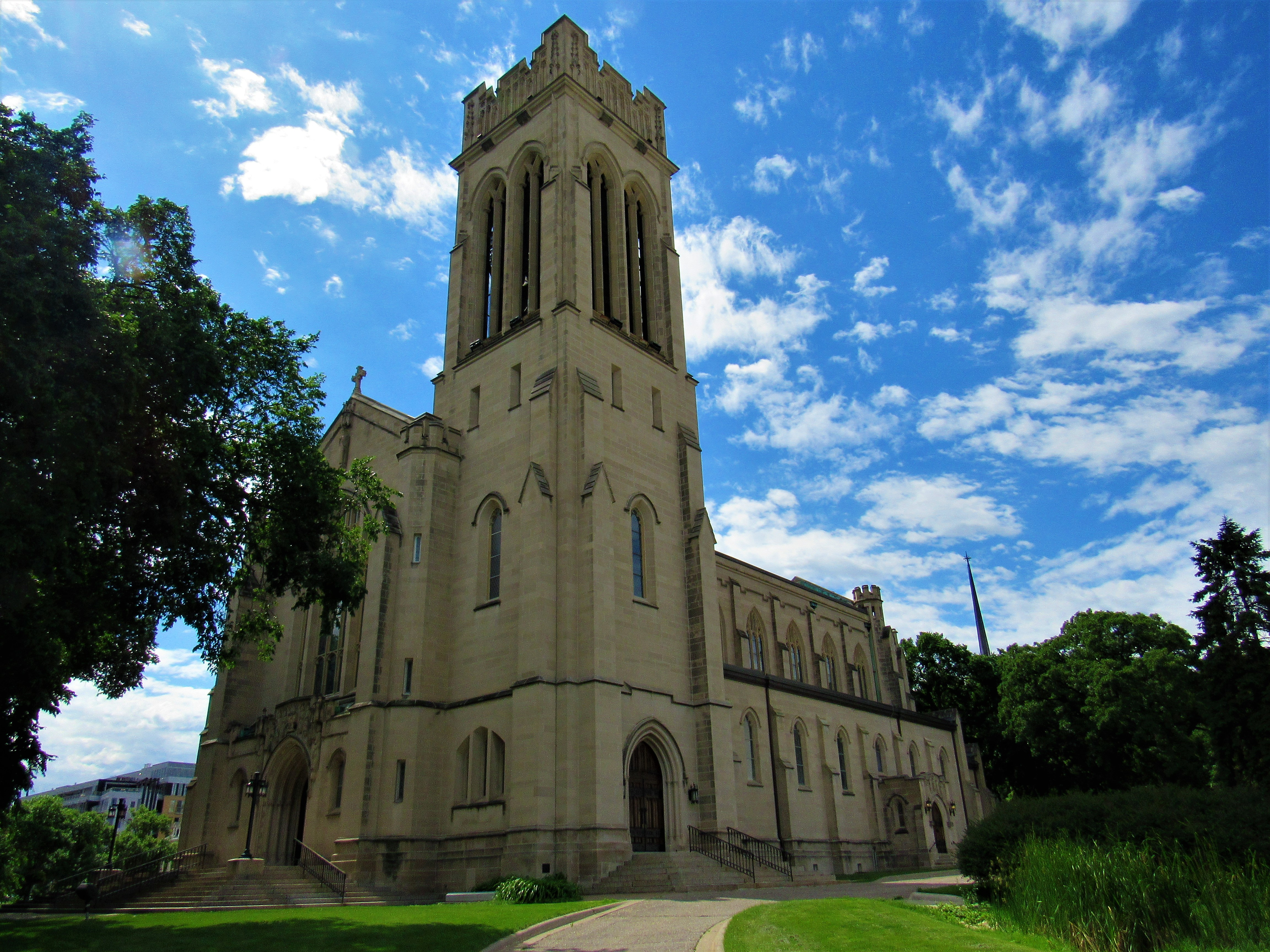
Episcopal Cathedral of St. Mark, Minneapolis, Minnesota, 1908-11.

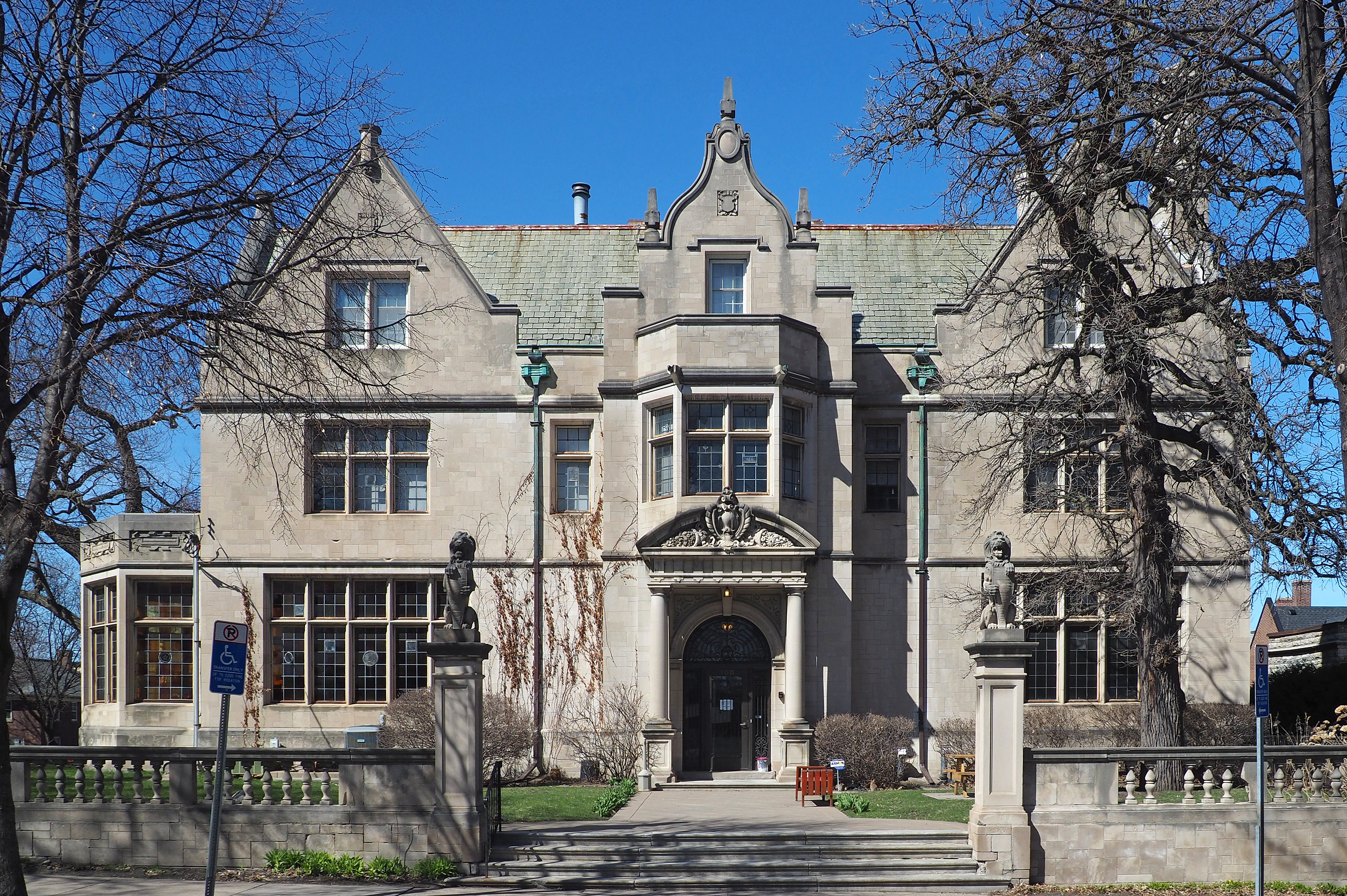
House for Charles S. Pillsbury, Minneapolis, Minnesota, 1912.

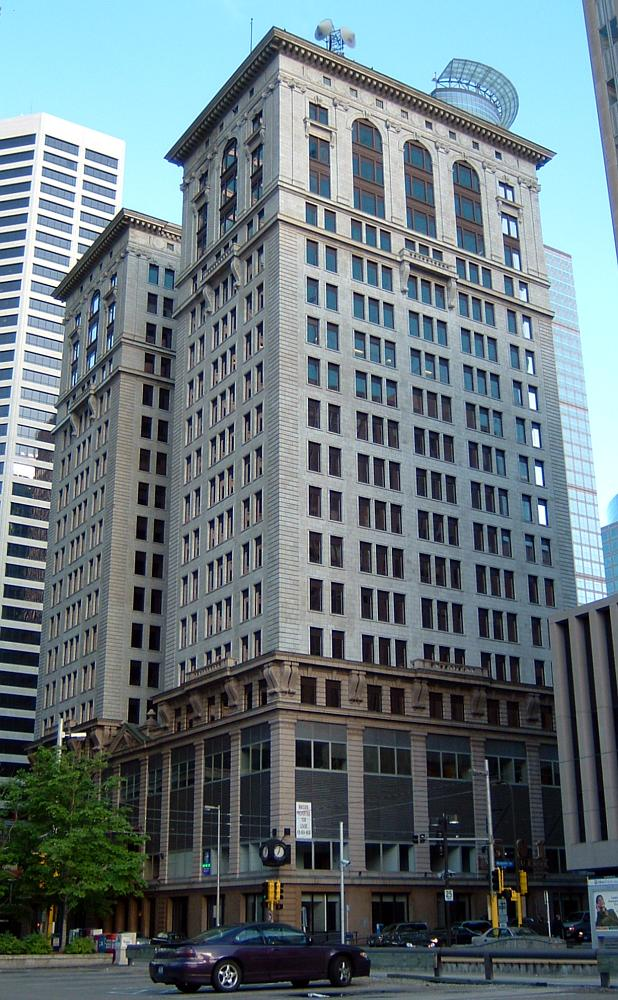
Soo Line Building, Minneapolis, Minnesota, 1914-15.

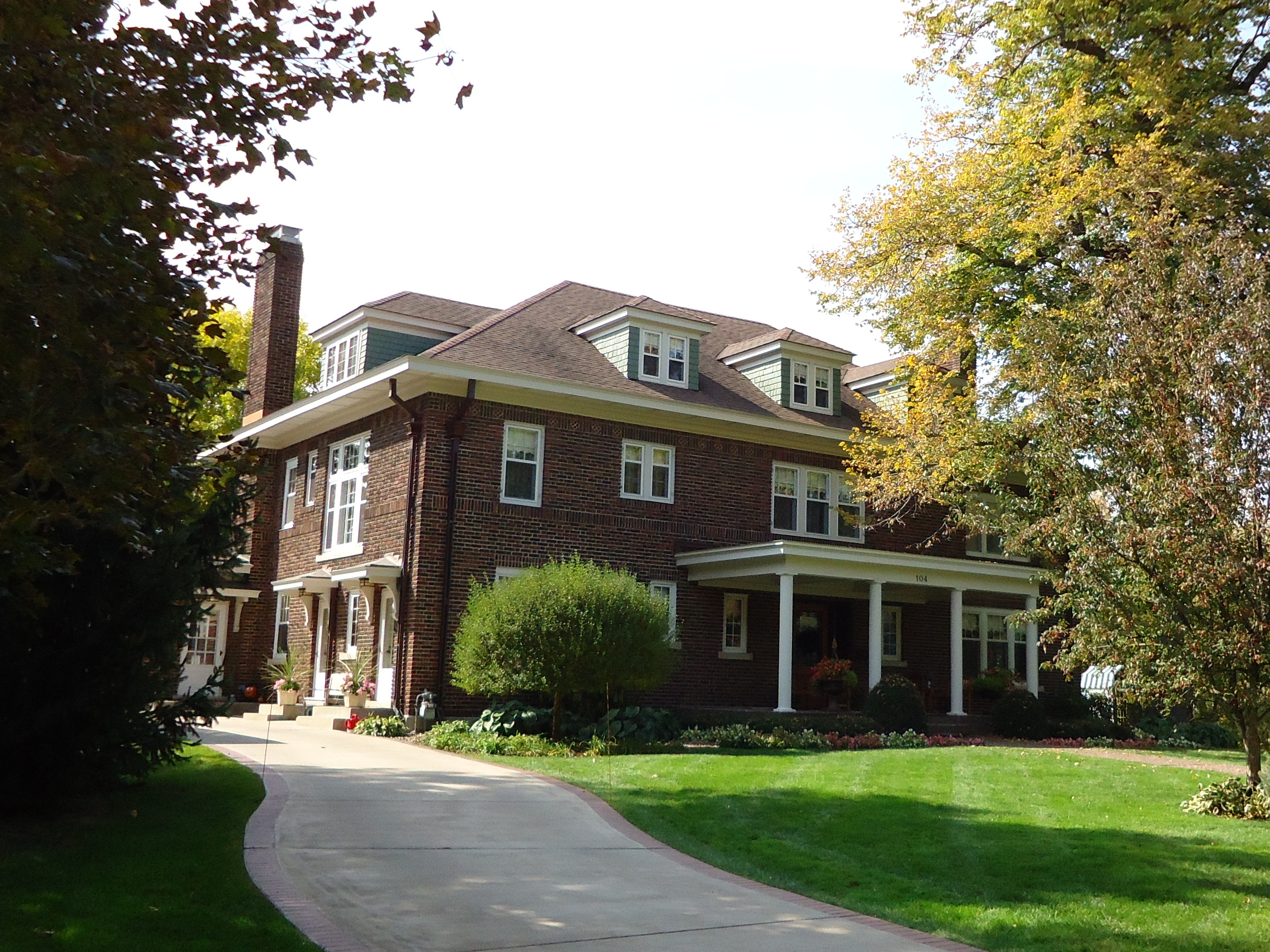
House for Roy Wilcox, Eau Claire, Wisconsin, 1915.

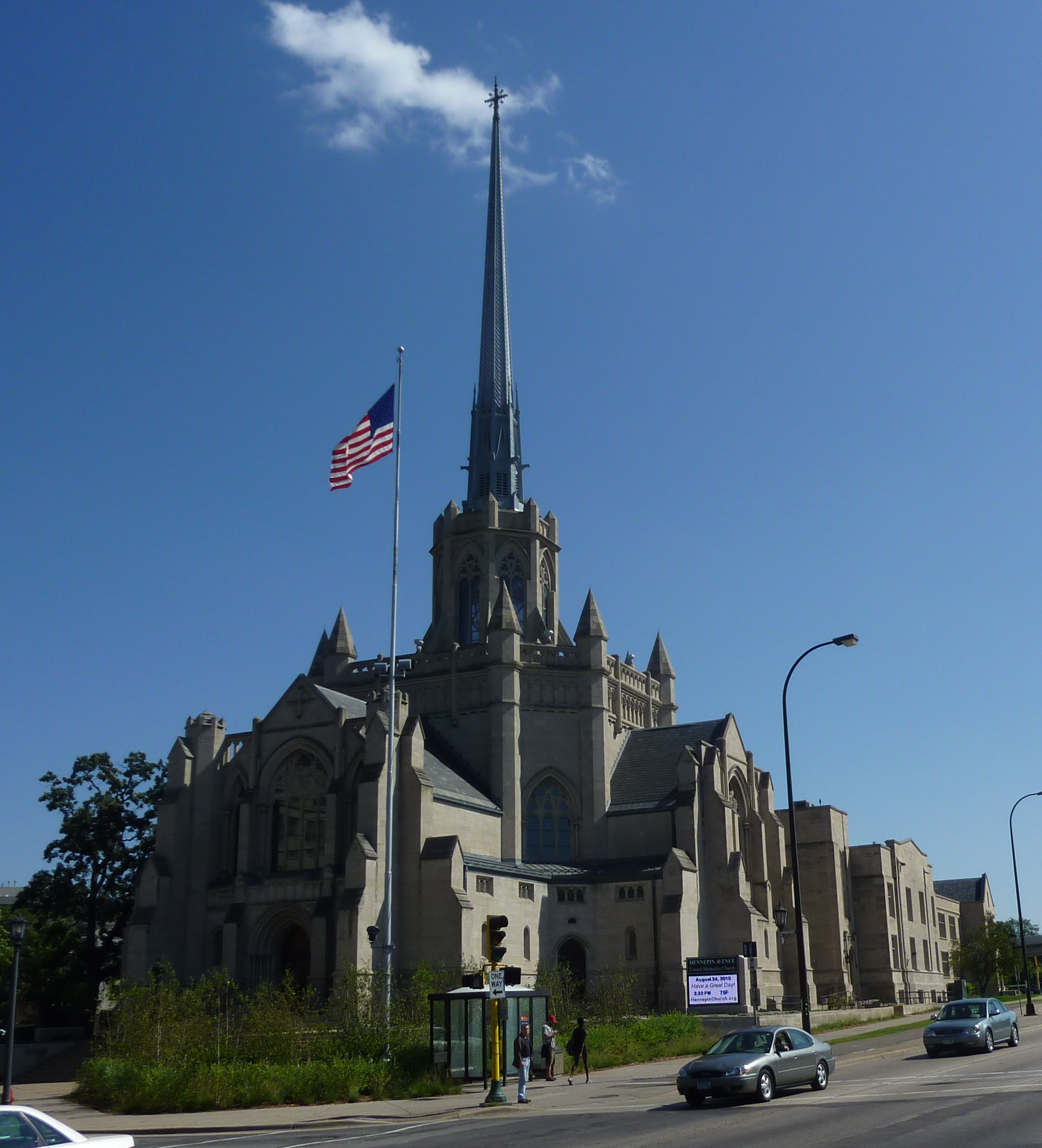
Hennepin Avenue United Methodist Church, Minneapolis, Minnesota, 1916.

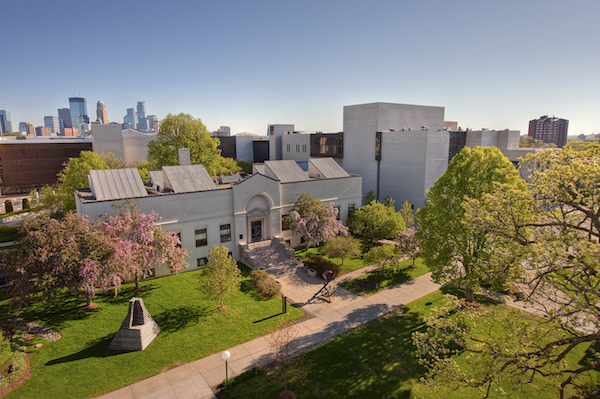
Julia Morrison Memorial Building, Minneapolis College of Art and Design, Minneapolis, Minnesota, 1916.

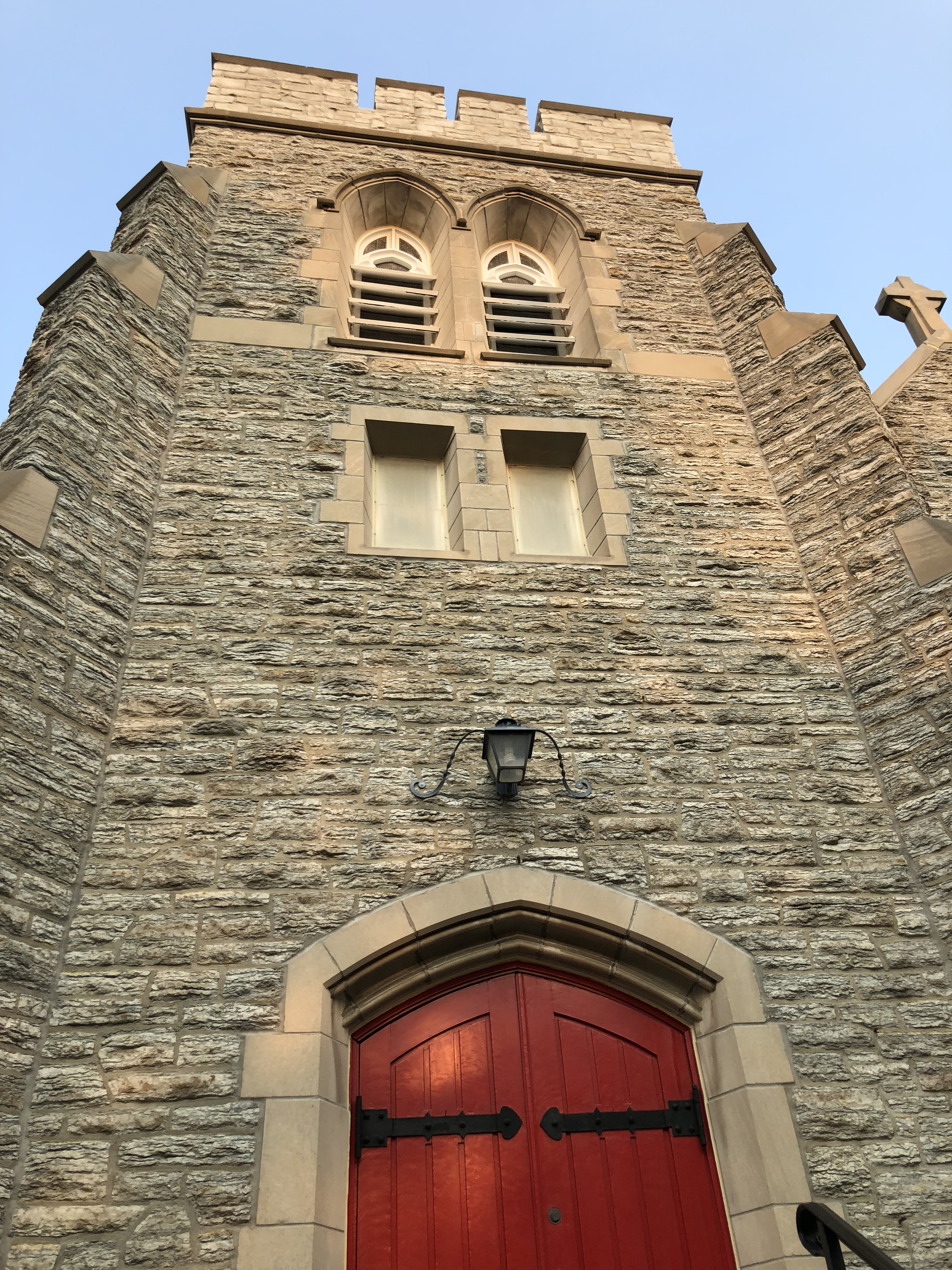
St. John's Episcopal Church, Minneapolis, Minnesota, 1916-17.

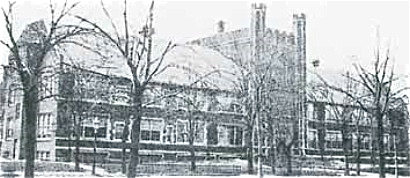
Northrop Collegiate School, Minneapolis, Minnesota, 1917.

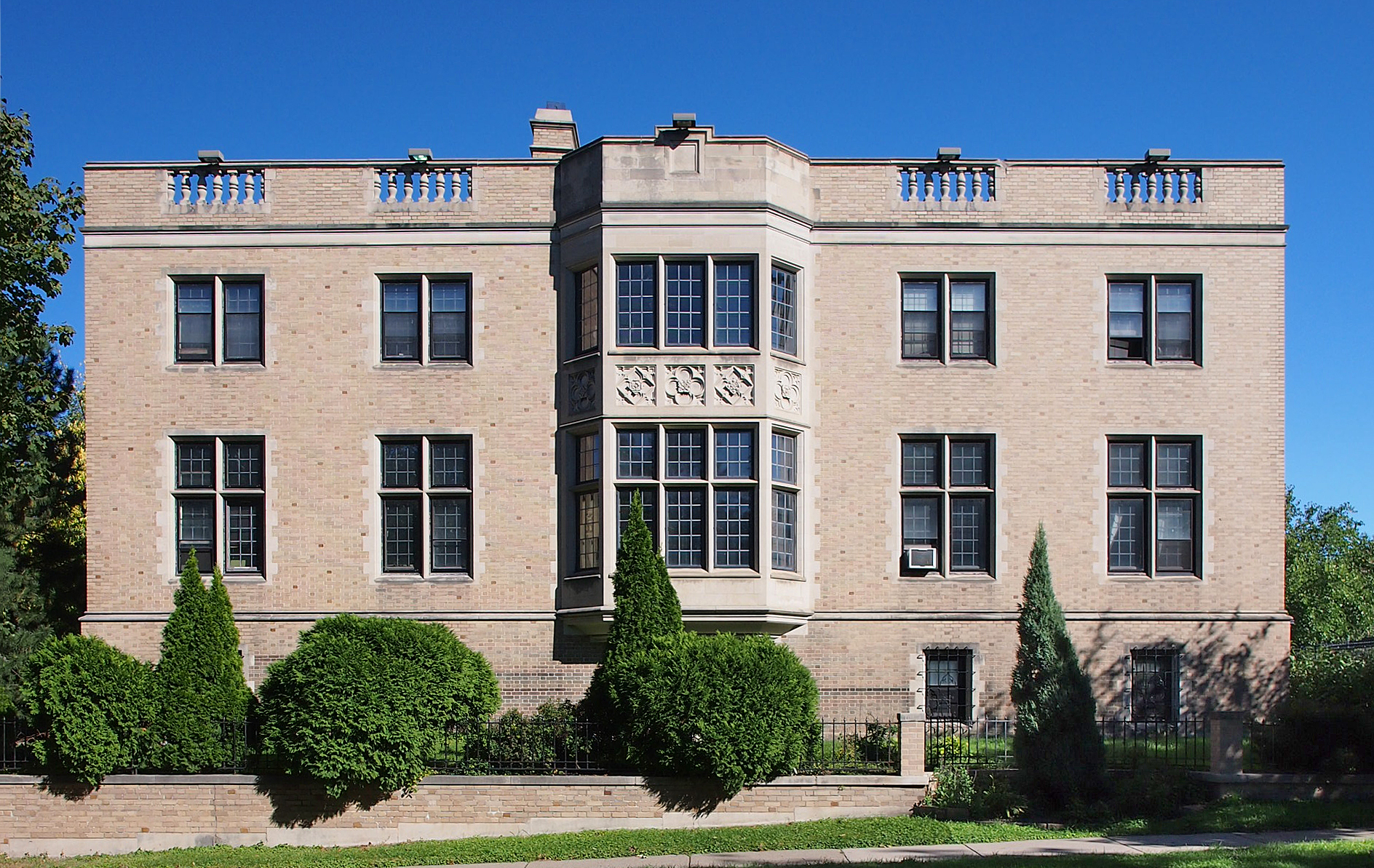
House for George H. Christian, Minneapolis, Minnesota, 1919.

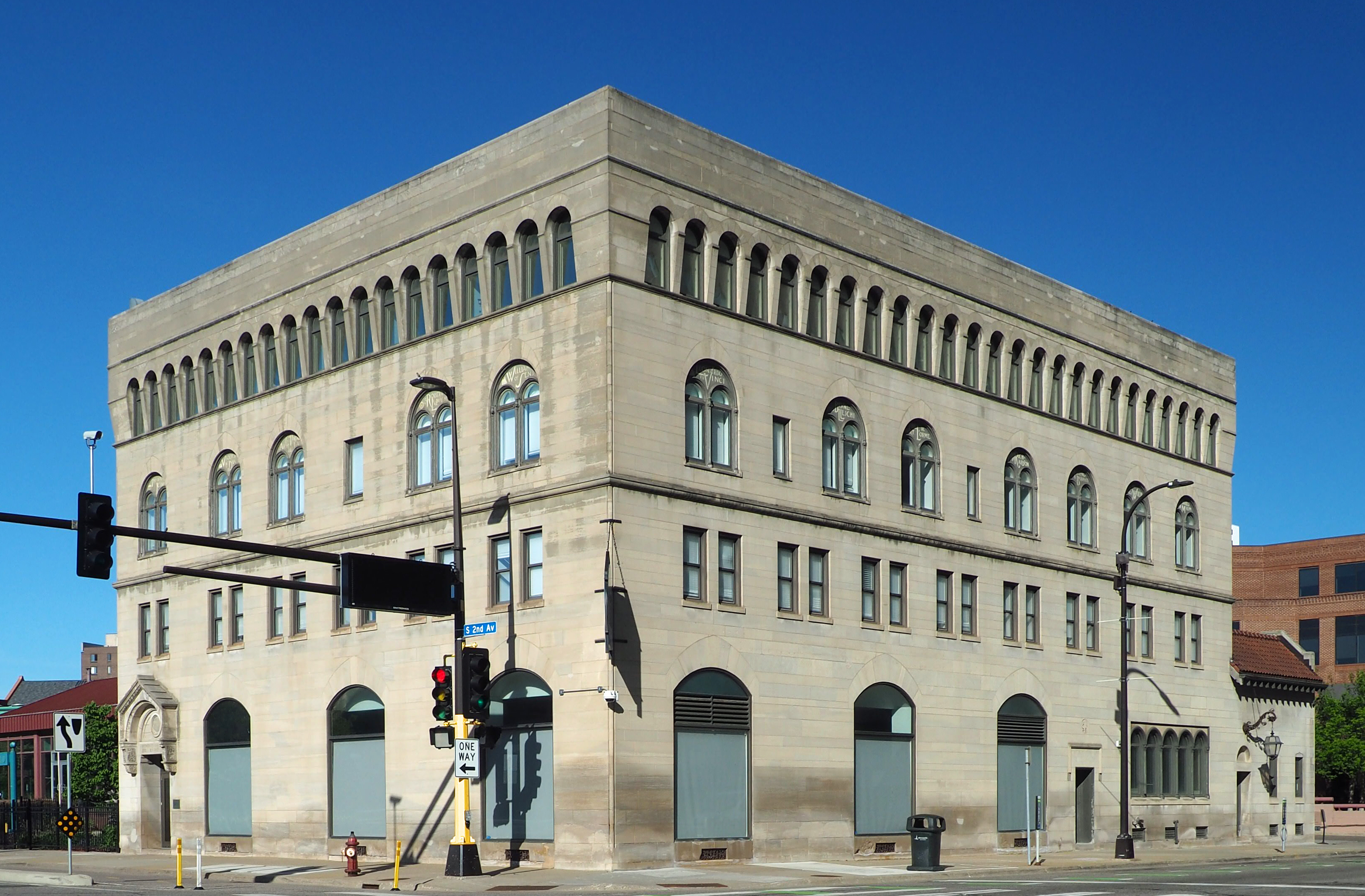
Architects and Engineers Building, Minneapolis, Minnesota, 1920.

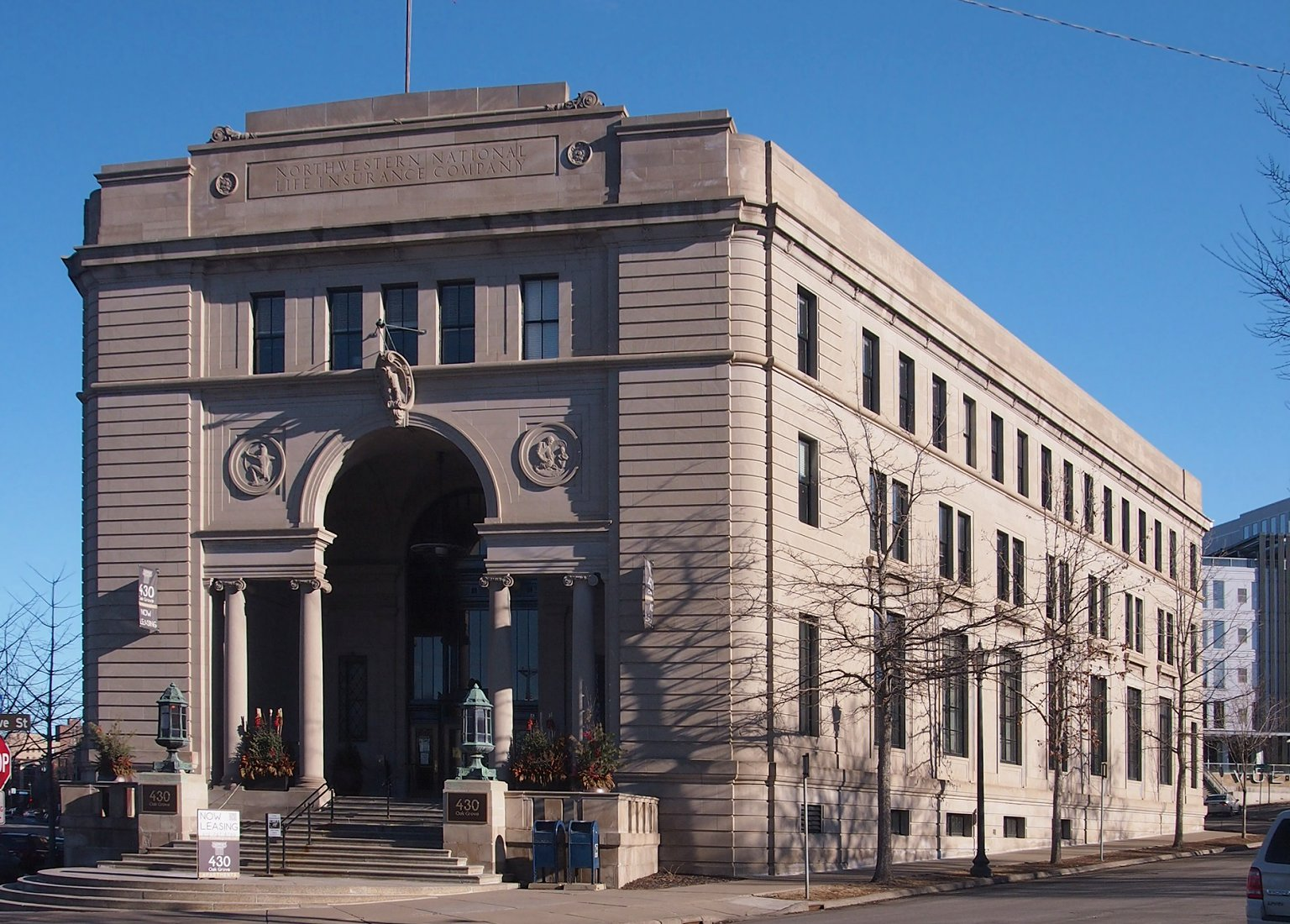
Northwestern National Life Insurance Company Home Office, Minneapolis, Minnesota, 1923-24.

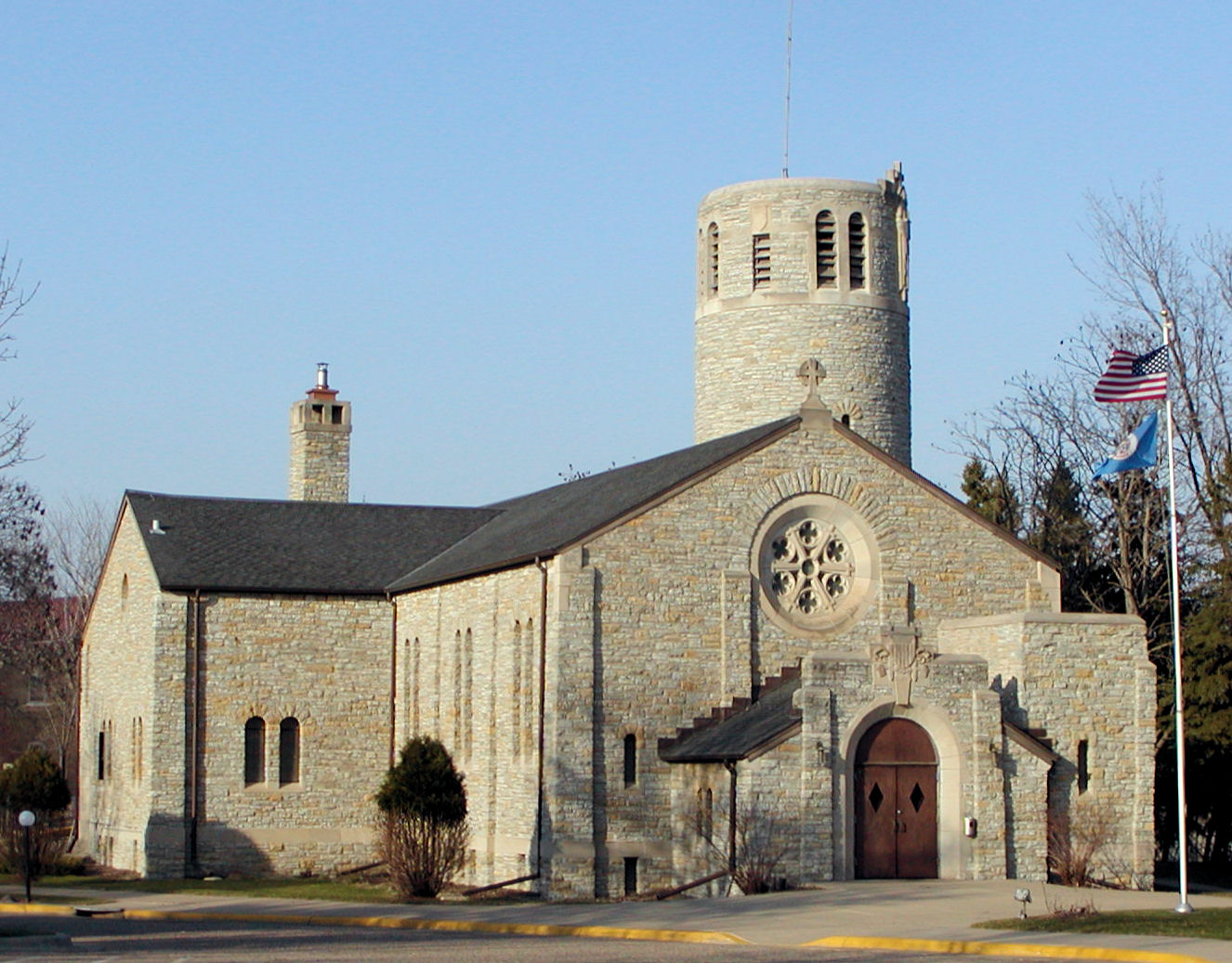
Fort Snelling Memorial Chapel, Fort Snelling, Minnesota, 1929.

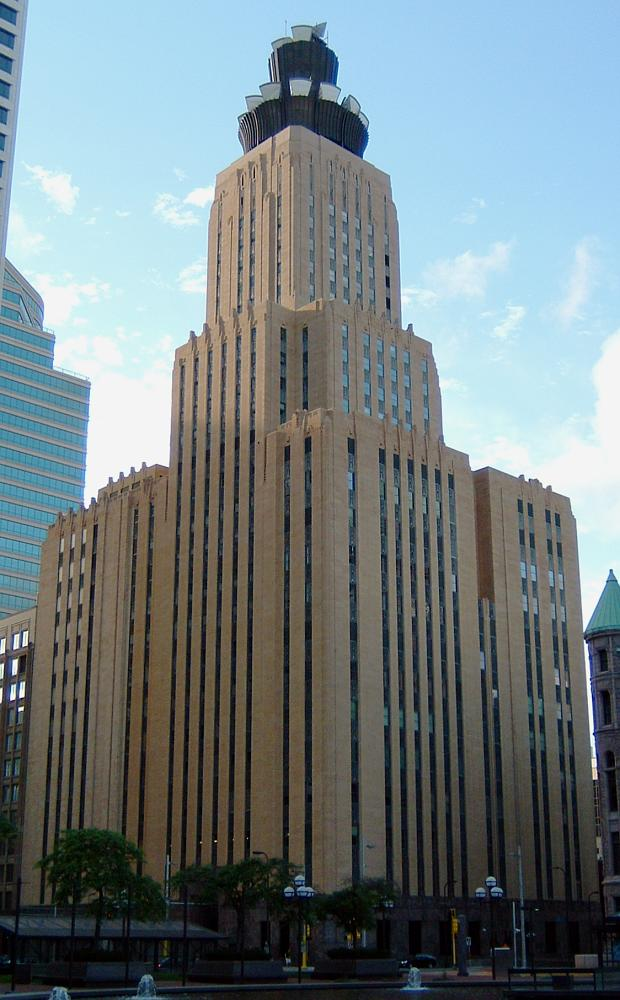
CenturyLink Building, Minneapolis, Minnesota, 1932.
