= 2017–18 WPI Engineers men's basketball team =

American college basketball season

2017–18 WPI Engineers men's basketball
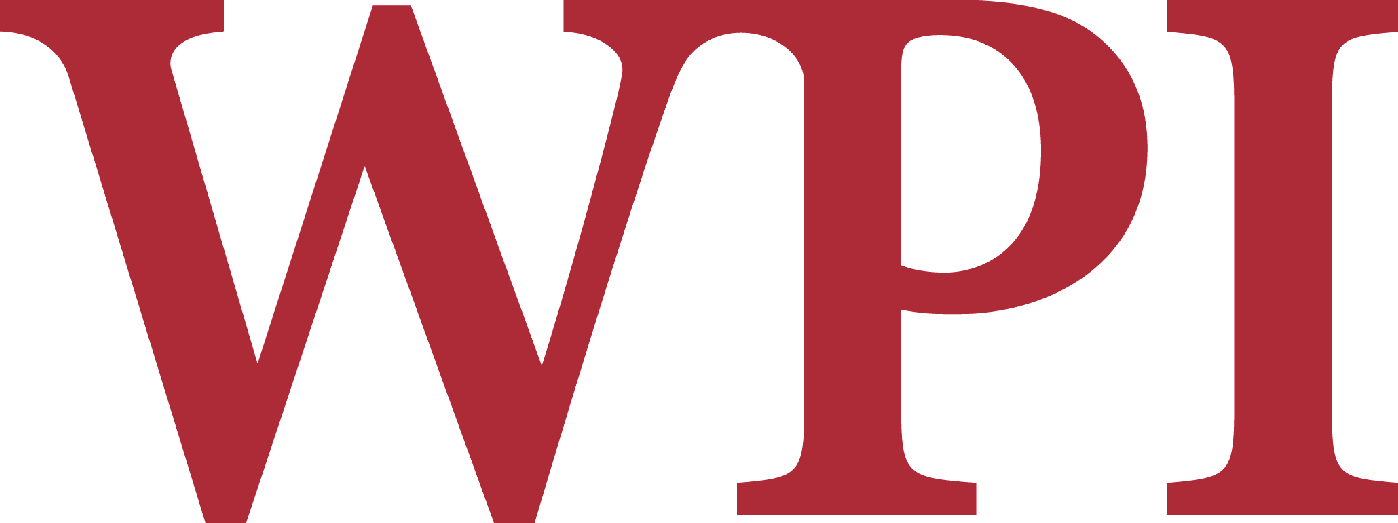
- Conference: New England Women's and Men's Athletic Conference

Ranking
- Coaches: No. NR (D3Hoops.com)
- Record: 16–11 (8–6 NEWMAC)
- Head coach: Chris Bartley (17th season)
- Assistant coach: Ryan Sheehan
- Home arena: Harrington Auditorium

The 2017–18 WPI Engineers men's basketball team represented Worcester Polytechnic Institute during the 2017–18 NCAA Division III men's basketball season. They were coached by a 20-year coaching veteran, Chris Bartely. The Engineers played their home games at Harrington Auditorium in Worcester, Massachusetts and competed in the New England Women's and Men's Athletic Conference (NEWMAC). They finished the regular season 14–11, 8–6 in the NEWMAC play to finish in fourth place. They lost in the finals of the NEWMAC Tournament to MIT. The Engineers finished the regular season with a 16-9 record, lost 61-63 to MIT in the Semifinal round of the NEWMAC Tournament, and failed to qualify for the 2017 NCAA Men's Division III basketball tournament.
