= Edwin H. Hewitt House =

Historic house in Minnesota, United States

- U.S. National Register of Historic Places
- Minneapolis Landmark
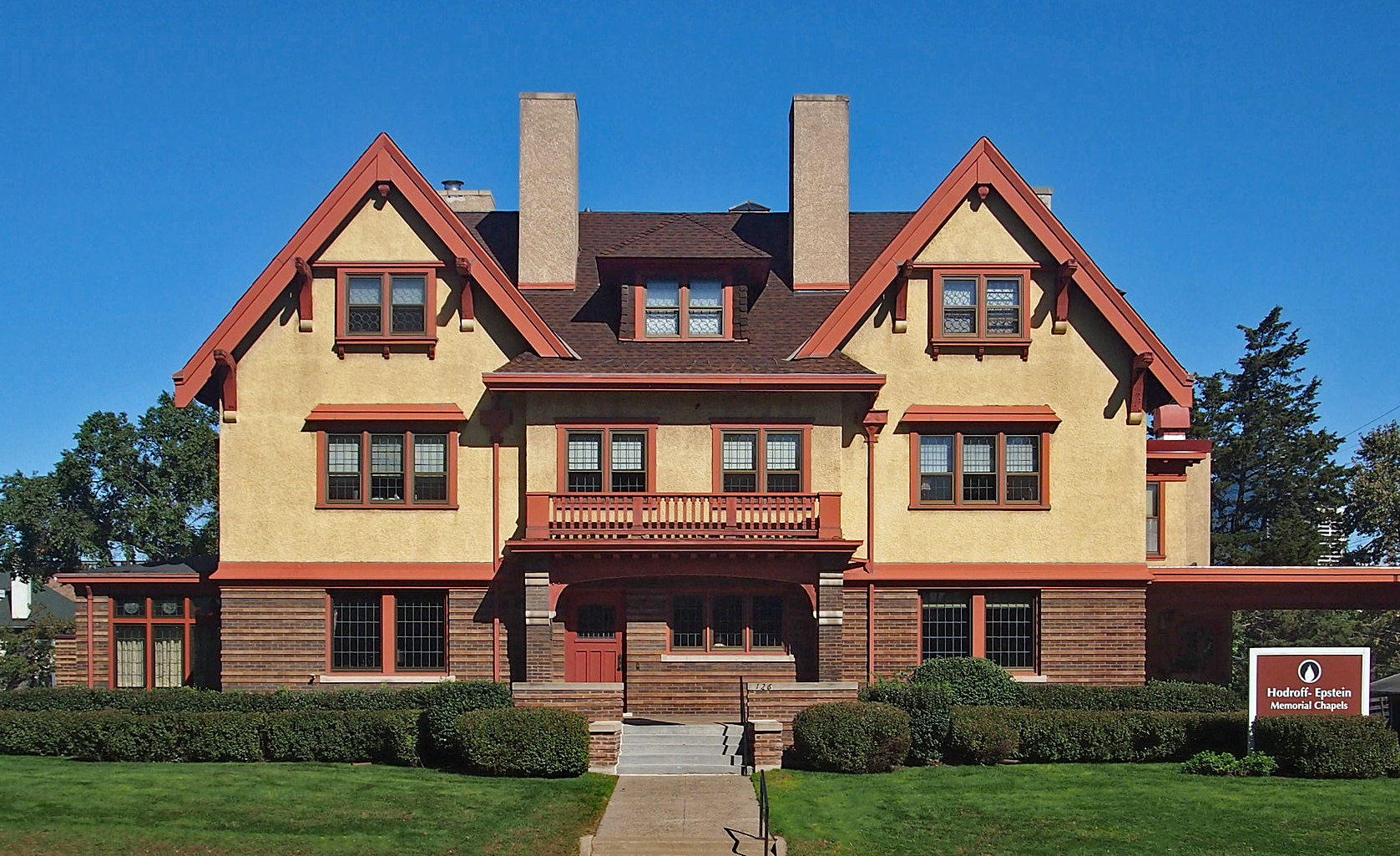
- The Edwin H. Hewitt House from the south

- Location within Minnesota Location within the United States
- Location: 126 East Franklin Avenue, Minneapolis, Minnesota
- Coordinates: 44°57′47″N 93°16′29″W
- Built: 1906
- Architect: Edwin H. Hewitt
- Architectural style: Late 19th And 20th Century Revivals
- NRHP reference No.: 78001539

Significant dates
- Added to NRHP: April 6, 1978
- Designated MPLSL: 1986

The Edwin H. Hewitt House is a historic house in the Stevens Square neighborhood of Minneapolis. Edwin Hawley Hewitt (1874–1939) was a prominent local architect. He designed this house, at the corner of Franklin Avenue and Stevens Avenue, in 1906. It was listed on the National Register of Historic Places in 1978.

== Education ==
Hewitt studied at the University of Minnesota, Massachusetts Institute of Technology, and the École des Beaux-Arts in Paris. He returned to Minnesota in 1904, and in 1911, he partnered with architect Edwin Brown. Hewitt's house is architecturally significant within Minneapolis and testifies to the impact of his career.

== Memorial Commission ==
Since 1919, the Soldier's Memorial Commission had been planning a memorial to all of the community's soldiers. A suitable location was sought and it was intended to be placed on Victory Memorial Drive. The memorial was budgeted at $100,000 and several fundraising plans were looked at. Mr. E.H. Hewitt of Hewitt & Brown Architects submitted a proposal and sketch for the monument. The Great Depression put a damper on the plans. The money collected was invested and had aided in maintenance of the bronze stars and crosses. The memorial was put on hold, to be looked at after World War II. It is not known what happened to the plans.
