= 2012–13 WPI Engineers men's basketball team =

American college basketball season

2012–13 WPI Engineers men's basketball
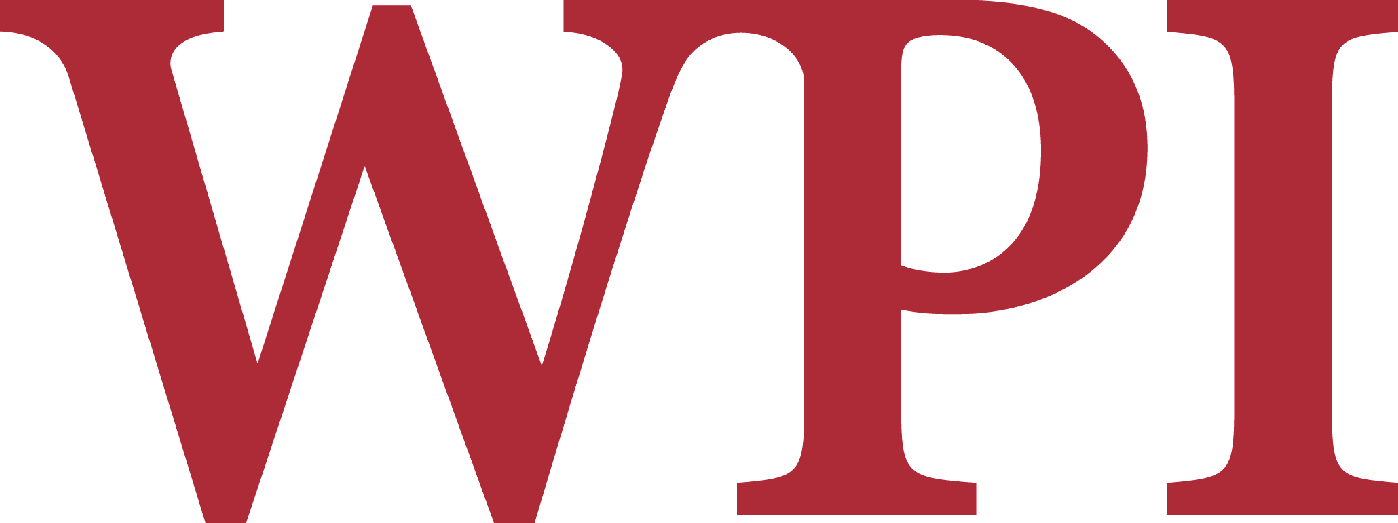

NEWMAC regular season champions NEWMAC Tournament champions

NCAA tournament, Second round
- Conference: New England Women's and Men's Athletic Conference

Ranking
- Coaches: No. 4 (D3Hoops.com)
- Record: 26–3 (10–2 NEWMAC)
- Head coach: Chris Bartley (12th season)
- Home arena: Harrington Auditorium

The 2012–13 WPI Engineers men's basketball team represented Worcester Polytechnic Institute during the 2012–13 NCAA Division III men's basketball season. They were coached by a 15-year coaching veteran, Chris Bartely. The Engineers played their home games at Harrington Auditorium in Worcester, Massachusetts and were a part of the New England Women's and Men's Athletic Conference.
