= Alumni Gymnasium (WPI) =

Type of athletic complex

- Alumni Gym
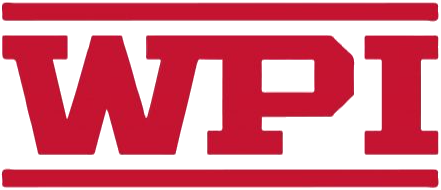

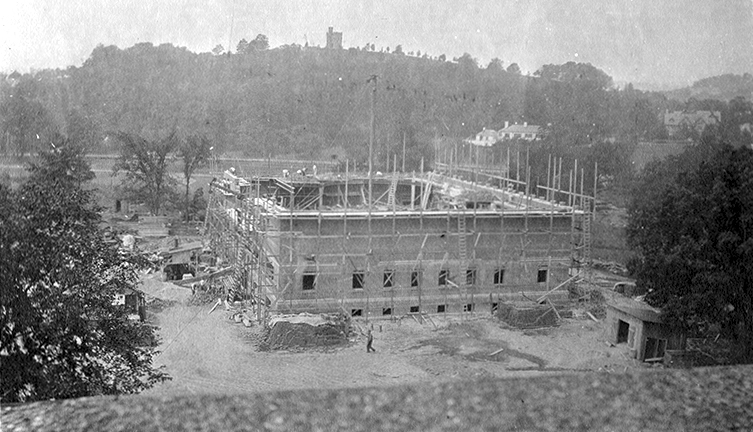
- The gymnasium under construction in 1915
- Interactive map of Alumni Gymnasium
- Location: 100 Institute Rd; Worcester, MA 01609
- Coordinates: 42.2744°N 71.8087°W
- Owner: Worcester Polytechnic Institute
- Operator: Worcester Polytechnic Institute

Construction
- Groundbreaking: 1915
- Opened: June 8, 1916
- Closed: 2012; 14 years ago
- Demolished: 2016
- Cost: US$128,500 ($4.09 million in 2025 dollars)
- Architect: Hewitt & Brown
- Builder: Central Building Co.

Tenants
- WPI Engineers baseketball (1918–1968)

Website
- wpi.edu/alumni-gym

Alumni Gymnasium, or Alumni Gym, was a multipurpose athletic complex on the Worcester Polytechnic Institute (WPI) campus in Worcester, MA. The gym had an indoor track, a basketball court, a swimming pool, a fitness center, a bowling alley, locker rooms, and athletic offices. The gym was closed in 2012 when the Institute opened a new recreation center. In 2016, with the approval of the Worcester Historical Commission, the 100-year-old building was razed to make way for the Foisie Innovation Studio.

== History ==
Following the turn of the century the lack of athletic facilities prohibited students from participating in physical training and athletics. The Institute had little interest in this matter, so at the 1911 Alumni Council meeting, the Class of 1886 started the efforts to raise funds for new facilities. An initial goal of $200,000 ($6.52 million in 2025 dollars) was set, which would provide funds for the construction of a gymnasium and field, as well as the purchasing of equipment and starting an endowment. In the summer of 1913, this goal was reached and ground was broke on Alumni Stadium.

With the stadium's completion in 1914, many were eager to begin work on the gymnasium and later that year Hewitt & Brown, a firm from Minneapolis composed of Edwin Hawley Hewitt and alumnus Edwin H. Brown '98, was selected as the architect. Central Building Company, whose president was alumnus Bradford A. Gibson '91, was awarded the construction contract in April 1915 and broke ground shortly afterward with the cornerstone being laid in June 1915. On June 6, 1916, the gym was opened following a dedication ceremony which included remarks by then Massachusetts Lieutenant Governor and future U.S. President, Calvin Coolidge.
