= WPI Engineers men's basketball =

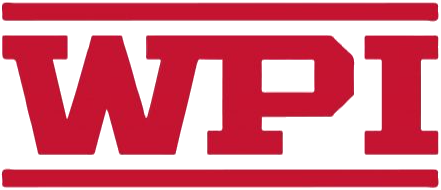
- University: Worcester Polytechnic Institute
- Head coach: Chris Bartley (22nd season)
- Location: Worcester, Massachusetts
- Arena: Harrington Auditorium (capacity: 3,000)
- Conference: NEWMAC
- Nickname: Engineers
- Colors: Crimson and gray
- Student section: Goat Nation

NCAA Division III tournament Elite Eight
- 1985, 2022

NCAA Division III tournament Sweet Sixteen
- 1985, 2005, 2022

NCAA Division III tournament appearances
- 1982, 1985, 2005, 2006, 2007, 2008, 2009, 2011, 2013, 2014, 2015, 2016, 2020, 2022

Conference tournament champions
- 2005, 2006, 2013, 2022

Conference regular-season champions
- 2004, 2005, 2006, 2007, 2008, 2009, 2011, 2013, 2014, 2022

Uniforms
Home	Away

The WPI Engineers men's basketball team is the college basketball program representing Worcester Polytechnic Institute (WPI). The Engineers compete in the Division III (DIII) of the National Collegiate Athletic Association (NCAA) and the NEWMAC. WPI's men's basketball program began competing regularly as a varsity sport in 1918. The team is currently coached by Chris Bartley.

WPI plays its home games at Harrington Auditorium, located on the campus in Worcester, Massachusetts, with a capacity of 3,000.

== History ==
Although an informal team played in 1902, the WPI Engineers basketball team was sponsored by the Athletic Association in 1903, but then was abolished in the spring of 1910. The sport was brought back in 1915, but only as an intramural. It wasn't until the winter of 1917–1918, that basketball became an intercollegiate sport again. The team won back to back New England Championships during the 1919–20 and 1920–21 and seasons. According to the Premo-Porretta Power Poll, the 1919–20 team would have been ranked 25th in the country.

The 1965–66 team was defeated by Army 71–62 on December 8, 1965. The win marked the first career coaching victory for the Hall of Fame coach, Bobby Knight.

During the 2012–13 season, the team was ranked second in the nation in National Collegiate Athletic Association's Division III and had their best start ever, going undefeated for their first 22 games. On February 24, 2013, WPI beat Springfield College in overtime to win the NEWMAC Championship and secure a place in the 2013 NCAA Division III men's basketball tournament.

The Engineers had a program record 27 victories during their 2021–22 season, which included a NEWMAC regular season championship, a NEWMAC tournament championship, and an Elite Eight appearance in the 2022 NCAA Division III men's basketball tournament. This marked the program's second NCAA quarterfinal game and first since 1985.
