= Colon Community Schools =

School district in Michigan, United States

Address
- 400 Dallas Street Colon, St. Joseph County, Michigan, 49040; United States

District information
- Motto: Where the magic happens.
- Grades: Kindergarten–12
- Superintendent: Richard Hilderley
- Schools: 3
- Budget: $8,835,000 2022–2023 expenditures
- NCES District ID: 2610410

Students and staff
- Students: 529 (2024–2025)
- Teachers: 41.26 (on an FTE basis) (2024–2025)
- Staff: 93.36 FTE (2024–2025)
- Student–teacher ratio: 12.82 (2024–2025)
- District mascot: Magi

Other information
- Website: www.colonschools.org

Colon Community Schools is a public school district in West Michigan. In St. Joseph County, it serves Colon and parts of the townships of Burr Oak, Colon, Leonidas, and Nottawa. In Branch County, it serves parts of Matteson and Sherwood townships. In Kalamazoo County, it serves part of Wakeshma Township.

== History ==
The town of Colon is named after the punctuation mark, not the large intestine. The district mascot, the Magi, refers to the town's tradition of celebrating magic, dating to the residency of magician Harry Blackstone Sr., who lived in Colon during the late 1920s.

In 1933, the Civil Works Administration funded construction of Leonidas Stone School, a distinctive fieldstone building in Leonidas. Citizens approved taxes to complete the building and it opened in 1935. The school continues to operate as a kindergarten through eighth grade school with about 35 students in 2025.

Colon Elementary opened in 1936. A seven-classroom addition was completed in 1953. The current Colon High School opened in March 1961. The architect was Guido Binda and Associates of Battle Creek. The old school, built in 1907, was then torn down.

Two bond issues, totaling $15 million, passed concurrently in 2010 to improve school facilities.

== Schools ==
Schools in Colon Community Schools district
School	Address	Notes
Colon High School	400 Dallas Street, Colon	Grades 6–12
Colon Elementary	328 East State Street, Colon	Grades K-5
Leonidas Stone School	30991 Church Street, Leonidas	Grades K-8
