= Huntsville Rockets =

American football team

General information
- Founded: 1962
- Folded: 1967
- Stadium: Goldsmith–Schiffman Field
- Headquartered: Huntsville, Alabama

Personnel
- Head coach: Tommy Lewis

League / conference affiliations
- Dixie Professional Football League; Southern Professional Football League; North American Football League; Southern

The Huntsville Rockets were a professional American football team based in Huntsville, Alabama, from 1962 to 1966. They played their home games at Goldsmith–Schiffman Field. The team name derives from the legacy of rocket development in the city.

== History ==
The Rockets were founded as members of the Dixie Professional Football League in 1962. The team played under the direction of head coach Tommy Lewis and line coach Dave Sington. They earned a 17–1 record in their debut season.

In 1963, the team moved to the new Southern Professional Football League, and Al "Monk" Romine took over as head coach. The SPFL faltered in 1965, and the Rockets moved to the North American Football League (NAFL). The Rockets played in the NAFL Southern Division from 1965 to 1966. The other NAFL teams in 1965 were: Pennsylvania Mustangs, Annapolis Sailors, Wilmington Comets, Baltimore Broncos, Florida Brahmans, Mobile Tarpons, and Dayton Colts. The team struggled on the field, and at the gate. With five games left in the 1966 season, the Rockets' NAFL franchise was revoked in October 1966 for failure to pay money owed to the league.

== Legacy ==
The NAFL became the Professional Football League of America (PFLA) in 1967. What remained of the defunct Huntsville Rockets team formed the foundation for the formation of a new PFLA franchise, the Huntsville Hawks, for the 1967 season. The PFLA merged with the larger Continental Football League in February 1968, and the team continued as the Alabama Hawks.

In 2012, a semi-professional Gridiron Developmental Football League team took their name as an homage to the original Huntsville Rockets.
