= Al Romine =

American gridiron football player (1930–2015)

No. 23, 42, 46
- Position: DB/HB

Personal information
- Born: December 11, 1930; Florence, Alabama
- Died: September 30, 2015 (aged 84); Phil Campbell, Alabama
- Listed height: 6 ft 2 in (1.88 m)
- Listed weight: 191 lb (87 kg)

Career information
- High school: Florence (AL)
- College: North Alabama
- NFL draft: 1955: undrafted

Career history
- Chicago Bears (1955); Green Bay Packers (1955); Toronto Argonauts (1956); Kitchener-Waterloo Dutchmen (1957); Green Bay Packers (1958); Ottawa Rough Riders (1959); Denver Broncos (1960); Boston Patriots (1961)

Awards and highlights
- UNA Athletic Hall of Fame, 1996

Career NFL statistics
- NFL-AFL Games played: 32
- NFL-AFL Games started: 0
- NFL-AFL Interceptions: 4
- Stats at Pro Football Reference

Alton Rollon Romine (December 11, 1930 – September 30, 2015) was a gridiron football defensive back and a halfback in the National Football League (NFL), the Canadian Football League (CFL), the Ontario Rugby Football Union (ORFU), and American Football League (AFL). He played for the NFL's Chicago Bears (1955) and Green Bay Packers (1955, 1958); the CFL's Toronto Argonauts (1956) and Ottawa Rough Riders (1959); the ORFU's Kitchener-Waterloo Dutchmen (1957), and the AFL's Denver Broncos (1960) and Boston Patriots (1961). Romine played collegiate ball for the University of North Alabama before playing professionally for 8 seasons. He retired from football in 1961. In 1963, he became the head coach of the Huntsville Rockets of the Southern Professional Football League. He died in 2015.
