= Goldsmith–Schiffman Field =

Stadium in Huntsville, Alabama

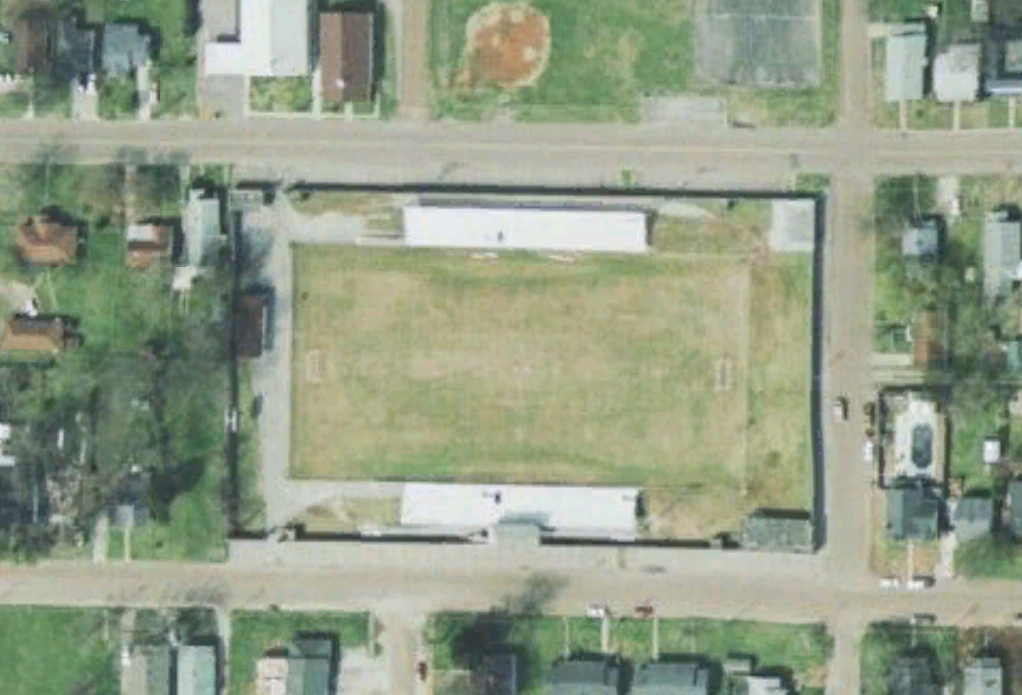
- USGS aerial view
- Interactive map of Goldsmith–Schiffman Field
- Coordinates: 34.74°N 86.58°W
- Owner: City of Huntsville, Alabama
- Operator: Huntsville City Schools

Construction
- Opened: October 4, 1934
- General contractor: Civil Works Administration

Goldsmith–Schiffman Field is a multi-purpose stadium in Huntsville, Alabama. From 1934 through 2012, it was used mainly for middle school and high school football. It was also home to the Huntsville Rockets from 1962 through 1967 and the now-defunct Alabama Renegades of the National Women's Football Association.

== History ==
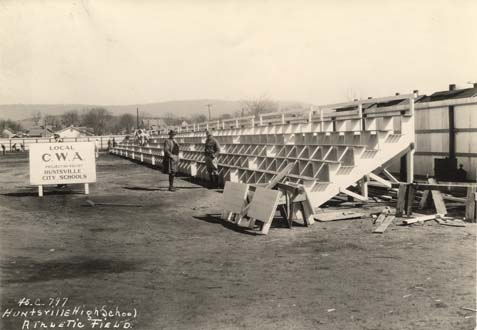
Stadium under construction in 1934.

On January 25, 1934, Oscar Goldsmith, Lawrence B. Goldsmith, Annie Schiffman Goldsmith, Robert L. Schiffman, and Elsie Strauss Schiffman gave the property to the city for an "athletic field or playground "for the enjoyment of the white students of the public schools." The Civil Works Administration provided $6,500 in materials and labor to construct the field, the first in Huntsville to accommodate night athletic games. The field was dedicated during the first night game on October 4, 1934, when 1,000 fans saw Coach Milton Frank's Huntsville High team defeat Gadsden High.

The racist language in the deed was ruled unenforceable and ignored as desegregation came to Huntsville City Schools.

The city moved activities to Louis Crews Stadium at Alabama A&M University in 2012, and because of disuse, heirs reclaimed title to the land. On September 5, 2014, after consulting with heirs "as far away as Scotland," Margaret Ann Goldsmith deeded the property to the city again, this time without restriction.

In October 2024, the city hired a Georgia-based engineering and design firm to develop overhaul plans for the facility. The renovation will add pickleball courts, new flag football fields, a concession building with restrooms and a playground.
