= Leonidas Stone School =

Leonidas School
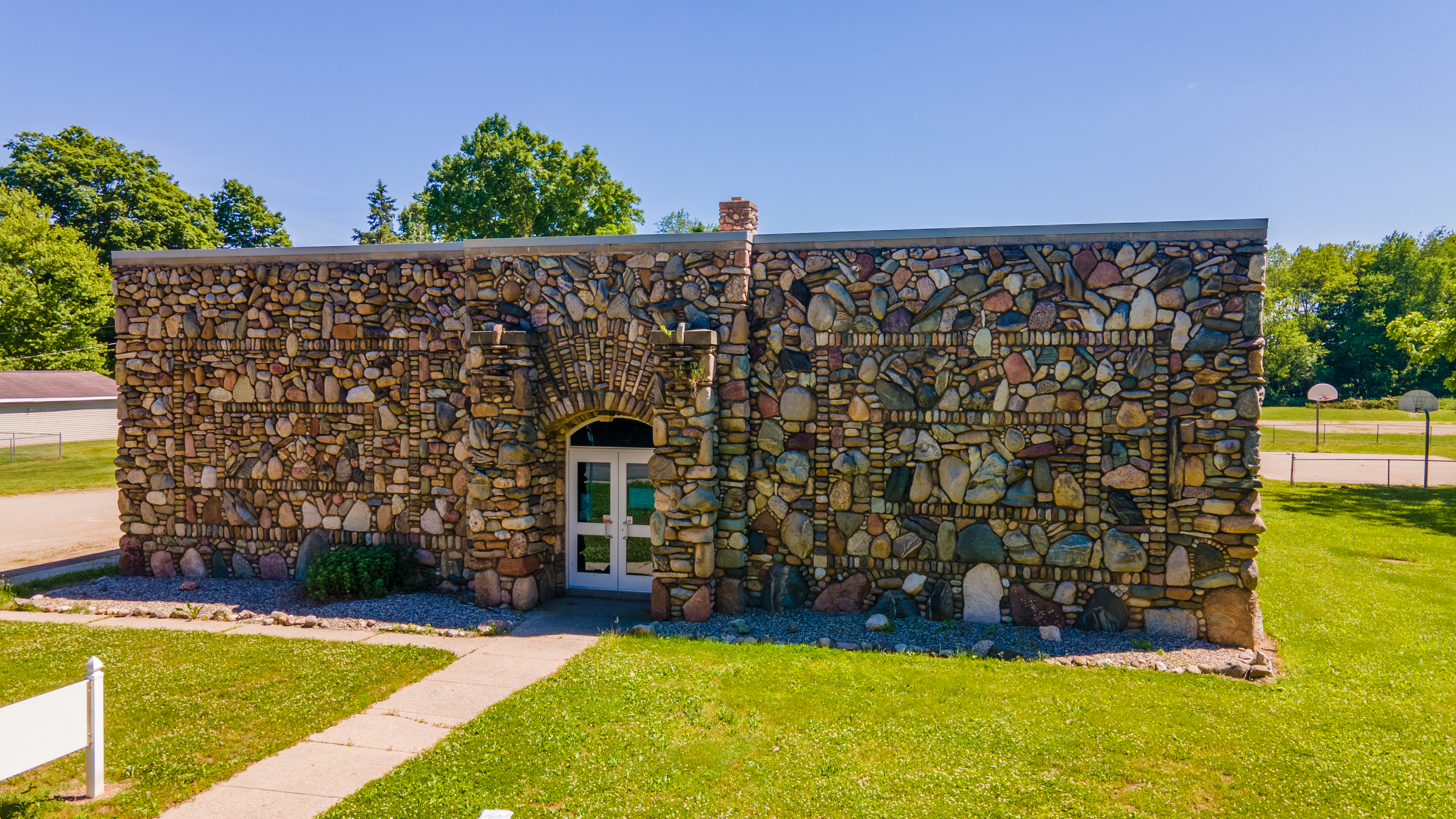

Location
- 30991 Church St. Leonidas, Michigan 49066; United States

Information
- Type: Public
- Principal: Richard Hilderley
- Grades: K–8
- Mascot: Magi
- Website: colonschools.org/District/Department/3-Leonidas

Leonidas Stone School is a school building which is part of the Colon Community Schools system in northeastern St. Joseph County, Michigan. The Leonidas Stone School is a work of art, an embodiment of government work project during the Great Depression, and a working school for nine decades as of 2025.

== Current Use ==
The School is a working school, part of the Colon Public School System. It houses grades K–8.

== Building history ==
The building that is now known as the Leonidas Stone School opened in 1935. Construction began on December 15, 1933. The building architect was Randall Wagner. It was part of President Franklin D. Roosevelt's New Deal Civil Works Administration. The building was built by two local stonemasons: Charlie Blue and Laverne Harmon. The two were acclaimed fieldstone builders, well known in Southern Michigan from the 1920-1950s. It is believed that all the stone is from fieldstone from local farms. Under the terms of the CWA project, the work had to be finished by Feb. 15, when construction only started in December.

"The Leonidas village school district [had] submitted a proposal for a new school building. Plans call for cobblestone construction."

The Construction of the building was to be a building 60 by 60 feet with four rooms and a basement, it was to be one story high. 18 men were employed to build the building. The Stone school was replacing the Leonidas village school which was built in 1859 and only cost $1,000 to build. Charles Robinson was in charge of the carpentry work and Charles Blue of the masonry work.

The four-room schoolhouse's interior was finished in oak.

The School was just one of several CWA projects in St. Joseph County. From the passage of the CWA until March, St. Joseph County had spent $121.601.14 for all projects, including the Stone School. In the State of Michigan all 72,000 workers were issued a dismissal order as the funding for the CWA projects ended on April 1, 1934.

== School History ==
In 1997, it was proposed that students would stop using the old fieldstone School and bus them to another location.

The school chairman at the time of the opening of the Stone School was Mark Smith, with the teacher for junior high school as Walter Gorsline, and Miss Grace Jenkins as a teacher of the grade school.

The Stone School celebrated its 60th anniversary on May 27, 1995, when they invited all prior students, teachers and community members back to share in the school's history.

== History of the Stones ==
Fieldstone is a nuisance for farmers and have to remove from the field during the nineteenth century they began to be used for construction. However, the stones can trace their roots in the Michigan area from Glacial deposits mostly from the last glacial period known as the Wisconsin Glaciation.

== Site of Interest ==
The Stone School House is listed on several cites for Michigan History and architecture as a place to visit.

The Stone School is sometimes including on Historic tours of the area.
