= Fieldstone =

Building material

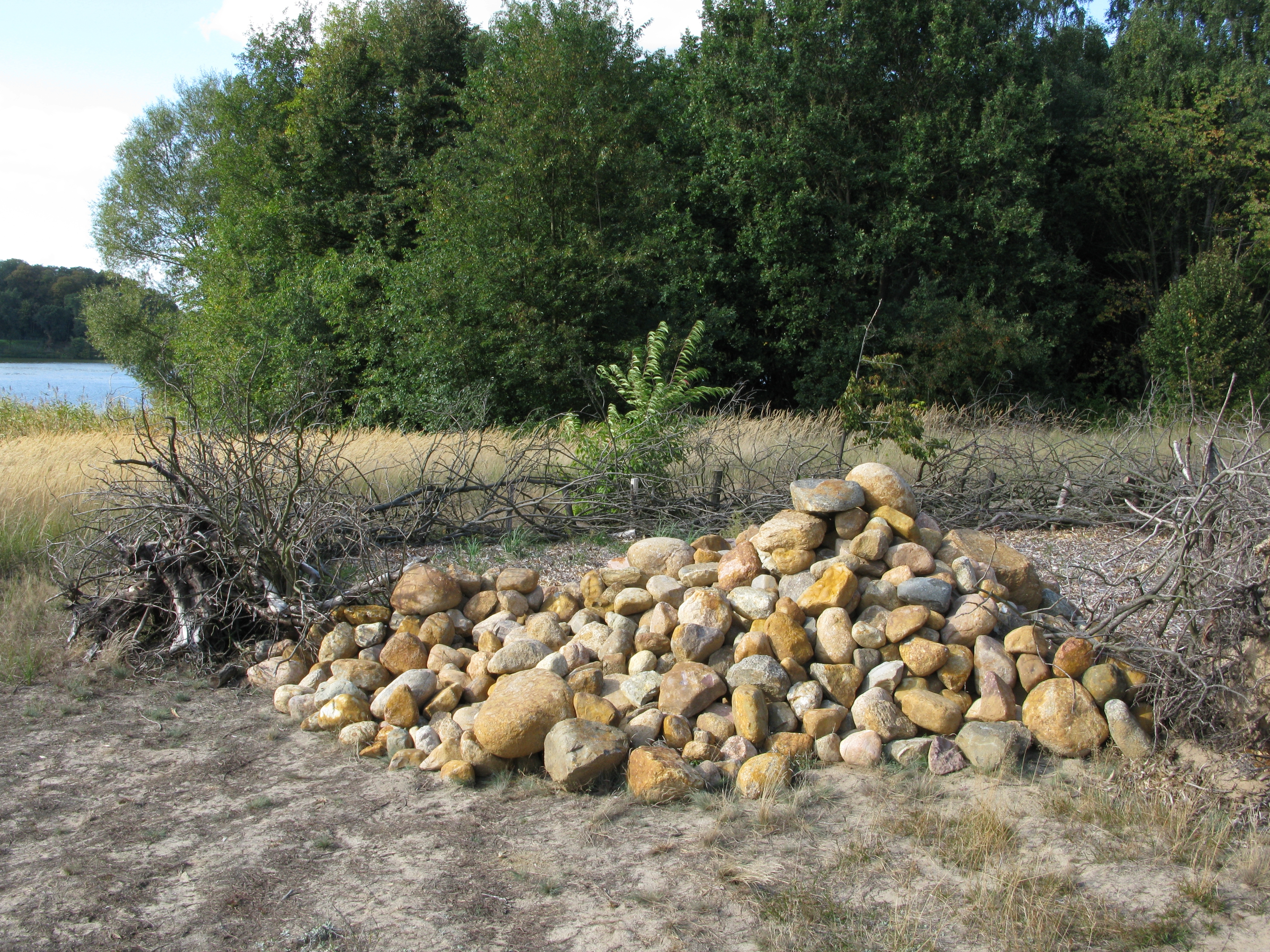
Collected fieldstones: A clearance cairn near Potsdam in Germany

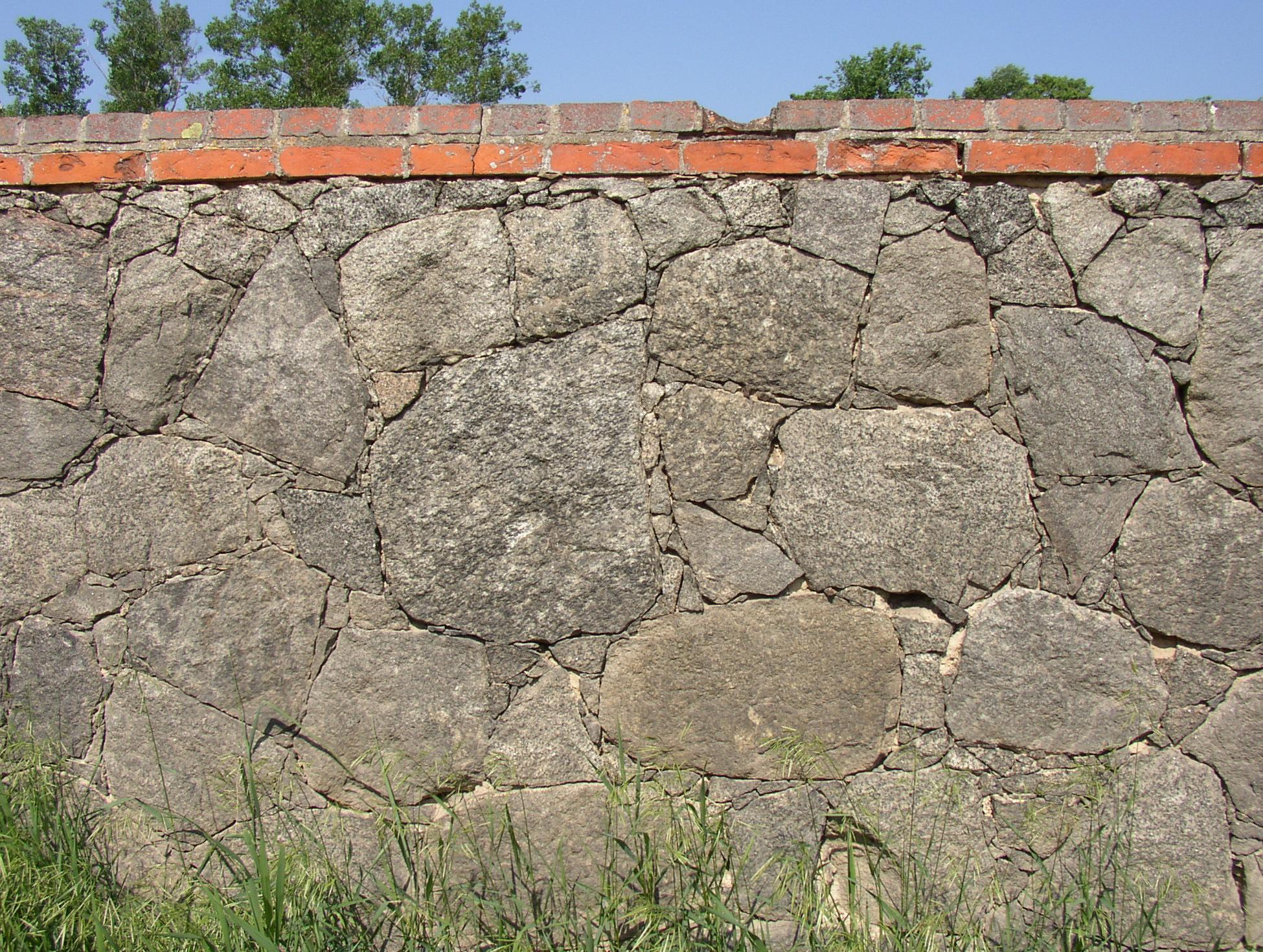
Fieldstone wall in Wriezen-Haselberg, Germany

Fieldstone is a naturally occurring type of stone, which lies at or near the surface of the Earth. Fieldstone is a nuisance for farmers seeking to expand their land under cultivation, but at some point it began to be used as a construction material. Strictly speaking, it is stone collected from the surface of fields where it occurs naturally. Collections of fieldstones which have been removed from arable land or pasture to allow for more effective agriculture are called clearance cairns.

In practice, fieldstone is any architectural stone used in its natural shape and can be applied to stones recovered from the topsoil or subsoil. Although fieldstone is generally used to describe such material when used for exterior walls, it has come to include its use in other ways including garden features and interiors. It is sometimes cut or split for use in architecture.

== Glacial deposition ==
Fieldstone is common in soils throughout temperate latitudes due to glacial deposition. The type of field stones left through glaciation, are known as glacial erratics. In Canada and the northern United States, the advance of the Laurentide Ice Sheet pulverized bedrock, and its retreat deposited several dozen meters of unsorted till in previously glaciated areas as far south as New England and the Upper Midwest.

Although a coarse layer of glacial ablation would settle on top of the deeper lodgment till, it was these more deeply set stones that would prove a persistent challenge for settled human agriculture because they would be frost-churned into surface soils during harsh winters.

Large collections of fieldstone can be found at the edge of the last glacial period, also known as the Wisconsin Glaciation. These edges are known as terminal moraines. Large deposits are found at the end of these glacial advances. In New England in the United States, field stone buildings and walls abound.

== Fieldstones and human settlement ==
Settled agriculture requires relatively fine and uniform soils for intensive use, and large rocks pose additional risks for agricultural machinery, which they can damage if not removed. Because the stones are widely disseminated, removing fieldstone is a widespread and costly activity in early agricultural settlement. To prepare fields for cultivation, farmers need to remove these stones, which requires significant manual labor. Until the 19th century, fieldstone was removed exclusively by hand, often with whole families participating in this task. Depending on the harshness of winters, this task needed to be repeated whenever frost levels churned new stones into soil surfaces. Thus, land with many fieldstones was and is considered marginal and is assessed for tax purposes well below land that is considered stone-free.

In mechanized agriculture, fieldstone is usually removed by a tractor attachment called a rock picker. A chain-driven wheel rotates a graded scoop, picking surface rocks from the soil, and shakes off excess soil. A hydraulic lift then tilts and empties the rock bucket, usually along the perimeter of the farm. Washed and split, field rock is considered an attractive landscape and building material, and can be expensive at building supply stores.

=== In New England ===
Fieldstone became abundant throughout New England and Eastern Canada as European settlers began to clearcut forests for timber, wood fuel, and agricultural expansion. Although settled agriculture and timber extraction began as early as 1620 in coastal areas, large-scale clear-cutting began in the late 18th century with increased immigration and inland settlement. Fuel and material demands led to the near-complete deforestation of the region. Cleared soils were subject to deeper freezing, which caused frost-churned stones to rise to the soil surfaces. When the virgin land was tilled, the fields were littered with rocks. Abundant and not as portable or versatile as other fencing materials, these stones were moved to the edges of fields and stacked into stone walls, for which New England is now well known.

Each spring, the stone walls were extended when the fields were plowed, as more stones were brought to the surface following the winter freeze and the spring thaw. Most such walls were stacked between 1775 and 1825, but efforts to repair and extend them continued throughout the 19th century. According to an 1871 agricultural census, more than 380,000 kilometres (240,000 mi) of fieldstone walls were constructed throughout the region, representing 40 million days of human labor. As agricultural production moved westward, areas of New England have since reforested.

=== On the High Plains ===
Fieldstone occurs extensively on the High Plains. On or near the surface, fieldstones come in many colors, and are limited in size to about 4 feet in diameter, although larger rocks are sometimes recovered. Pretty and colorful, fieldstones are used occasionally as building materials; some of the more stately homes on the Prairies are constructed of fieldstone and are over a century old. However, fieldstone as a building material is very much underused.

== Gallery ==
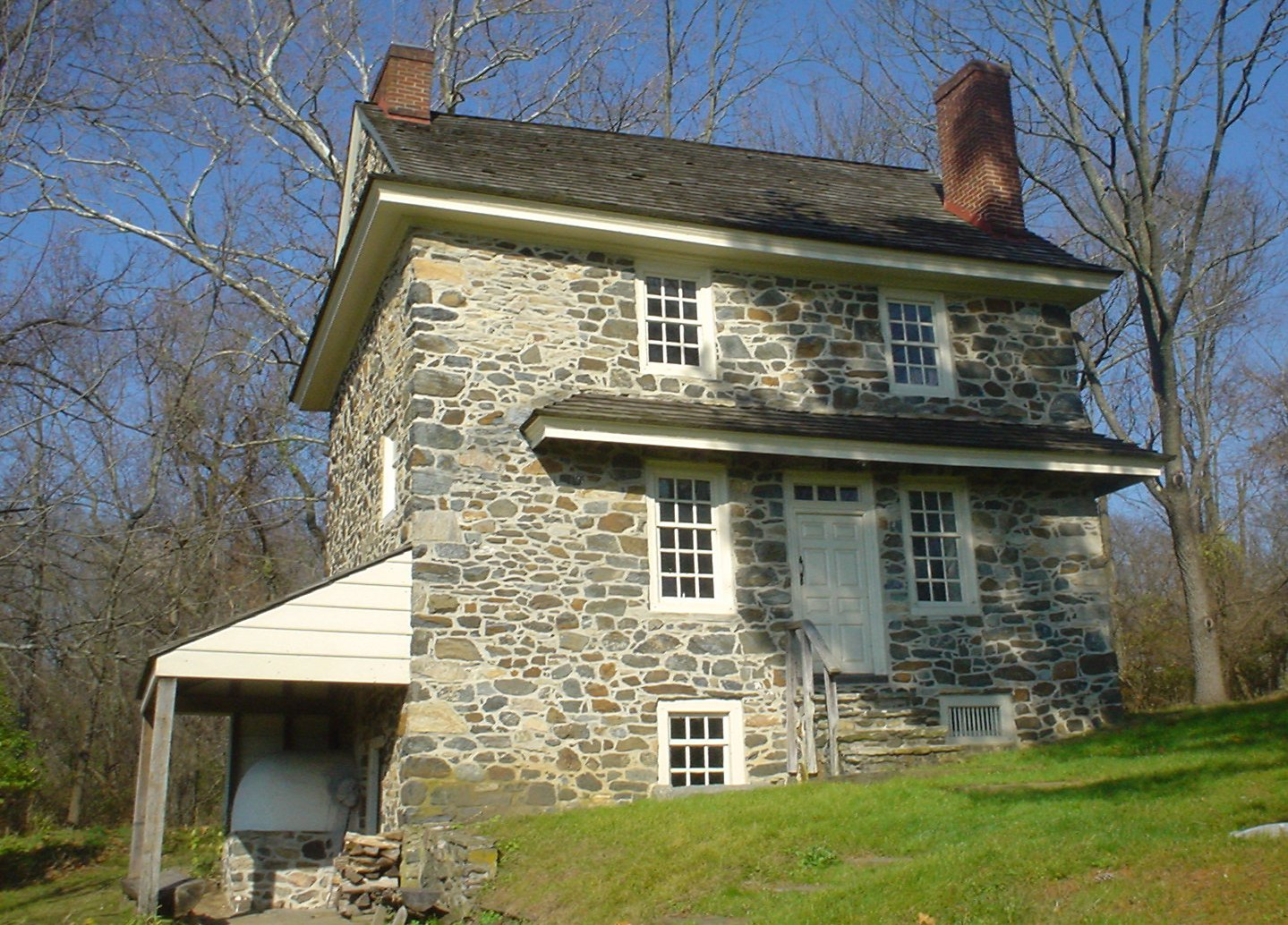
John Chads House, Pennsylvania, United States

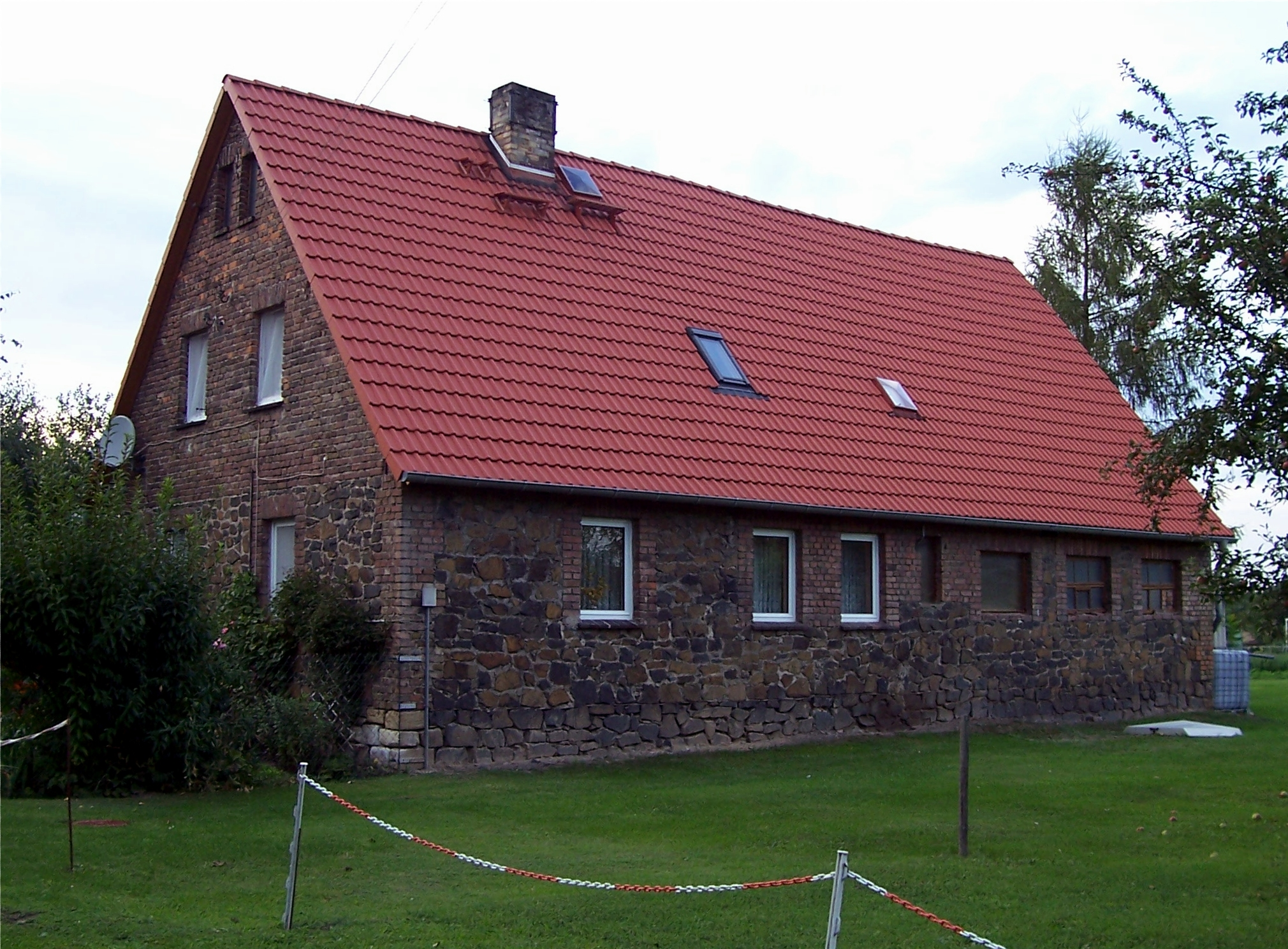
Fieldstone house in Saxony, Germany

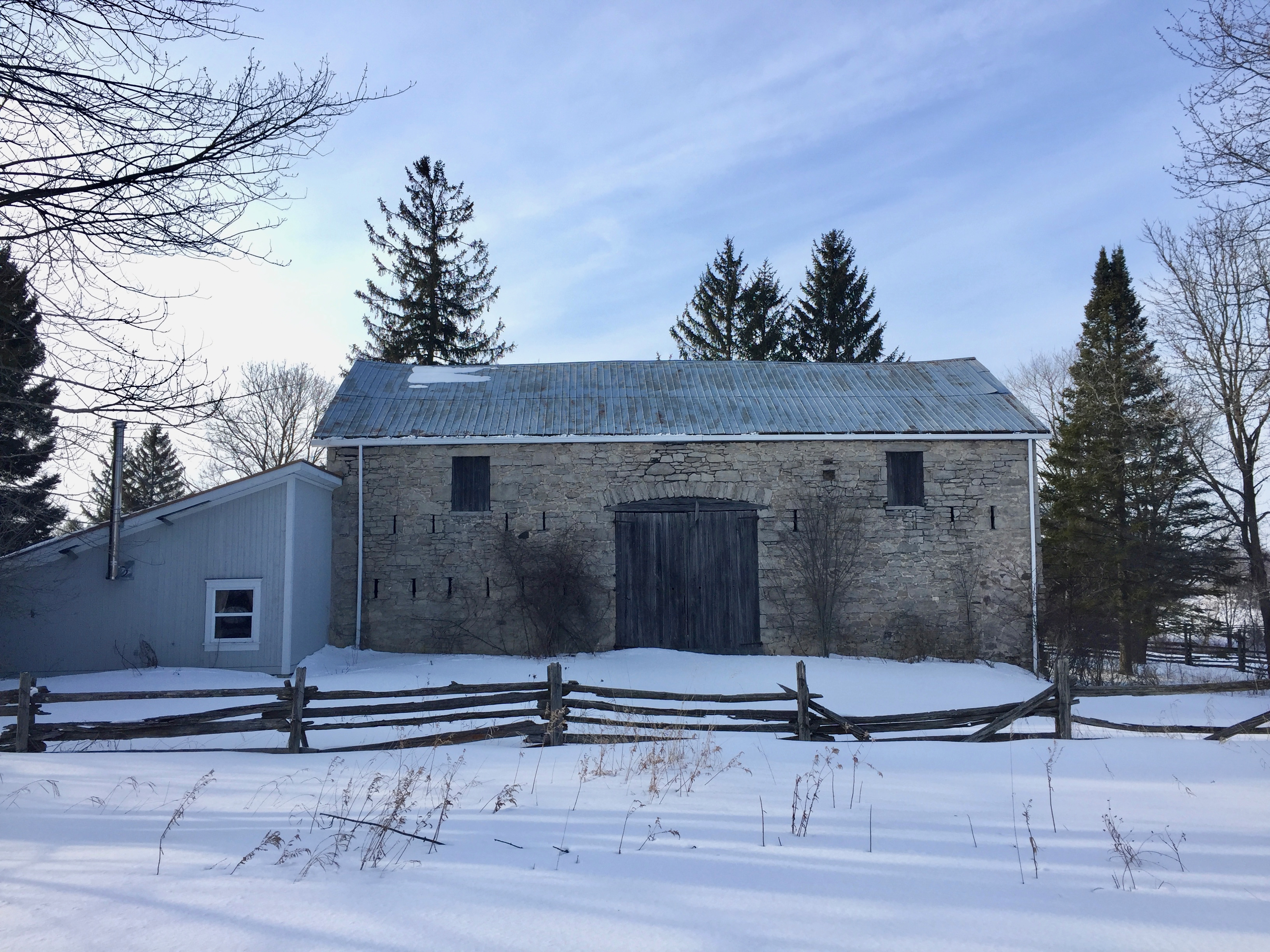
Fieldstone barn in Ontario, Canada.

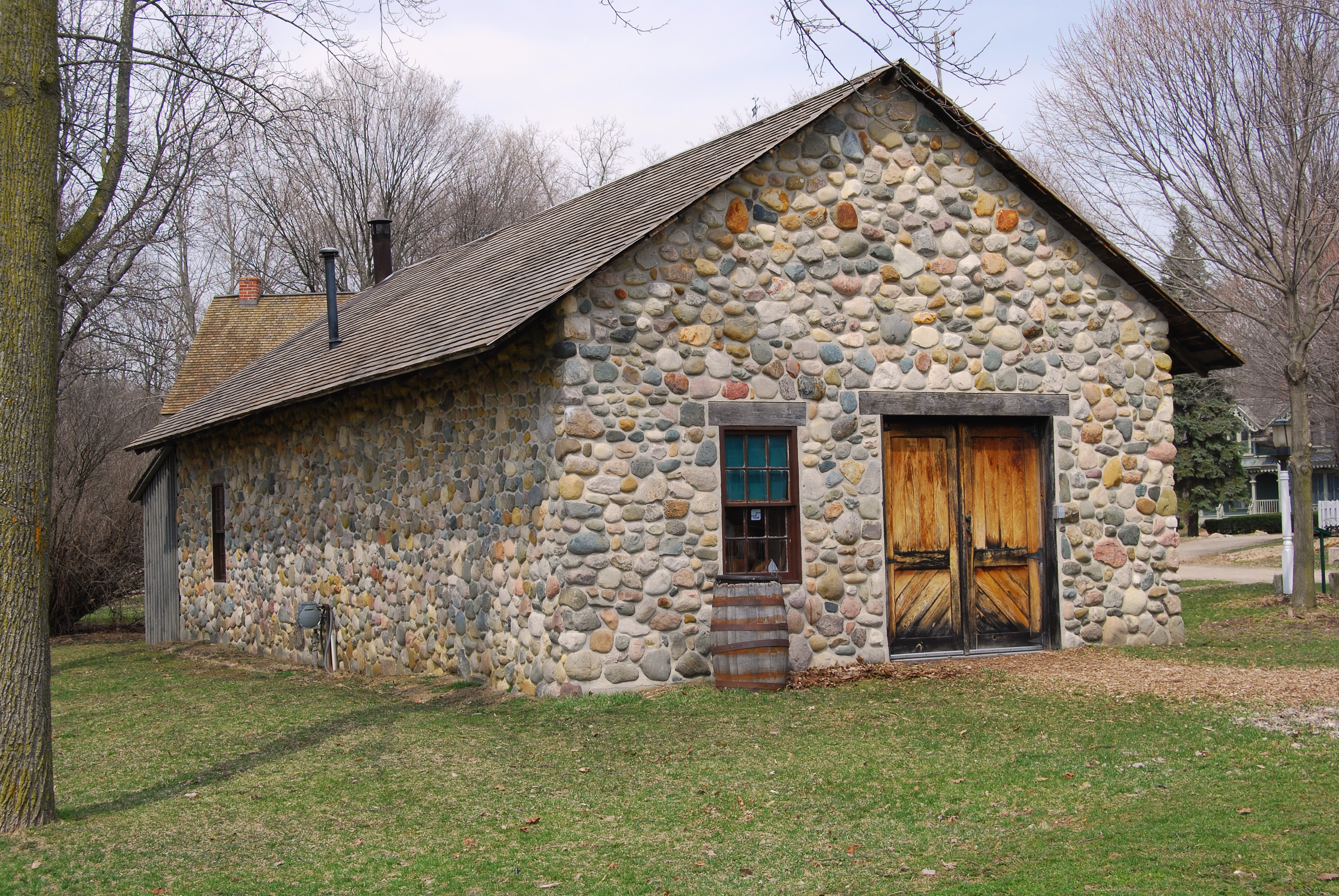
Fieldstone forge in Michigan, United States

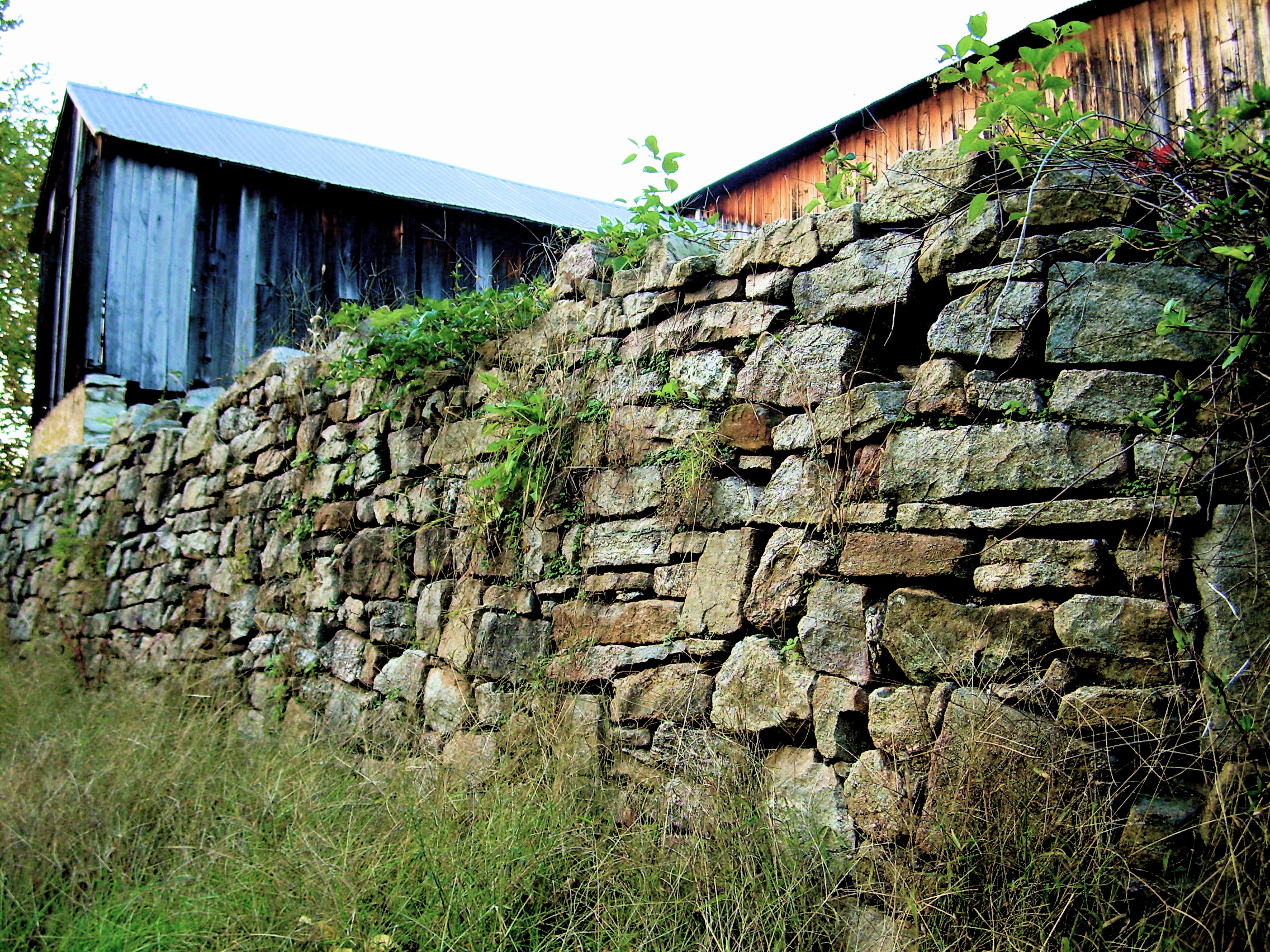
A fieldstone wall enclosing a Pennsylvania barnyard

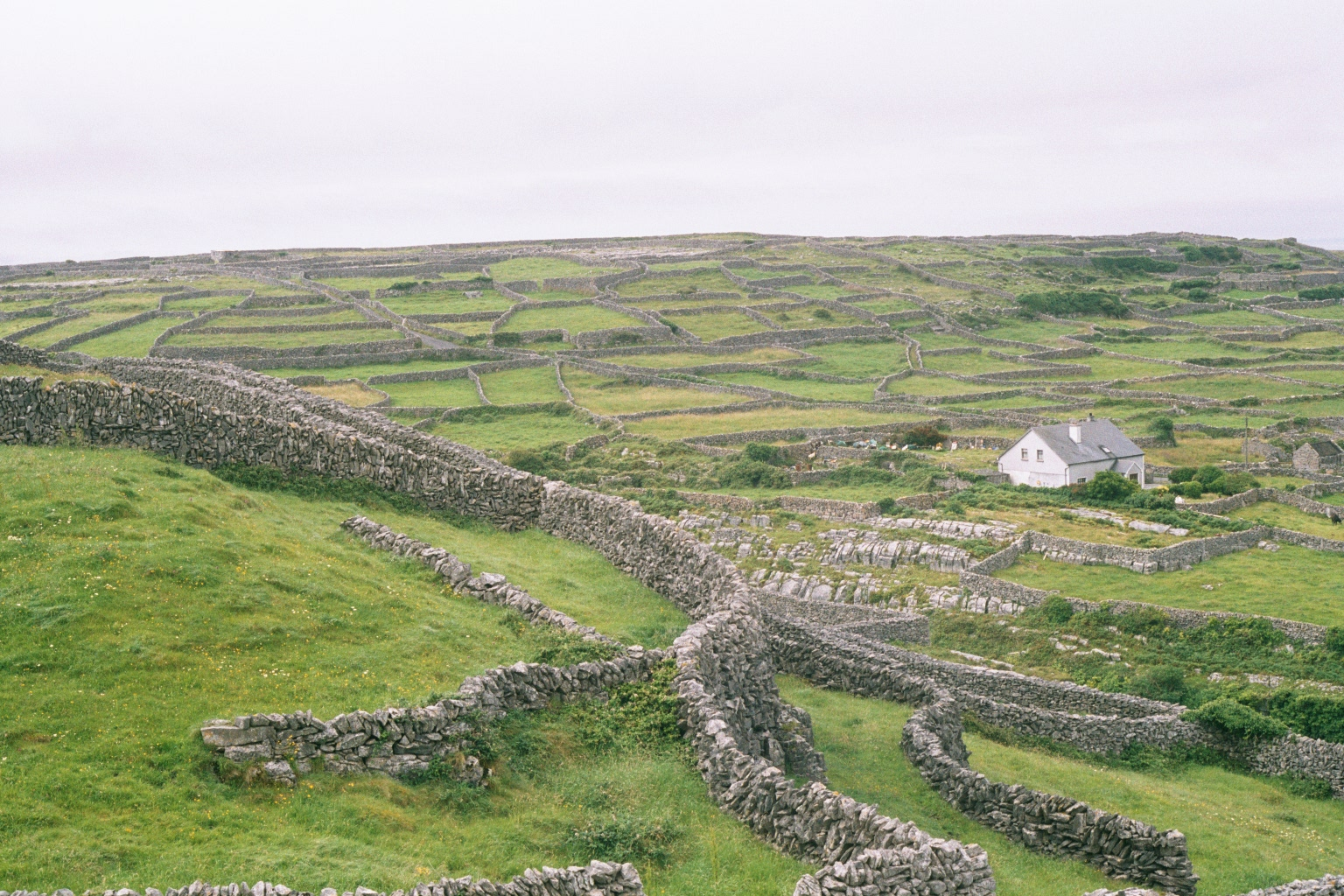
Dry-stone walls built of fieldstones on Inisheer, Ireland

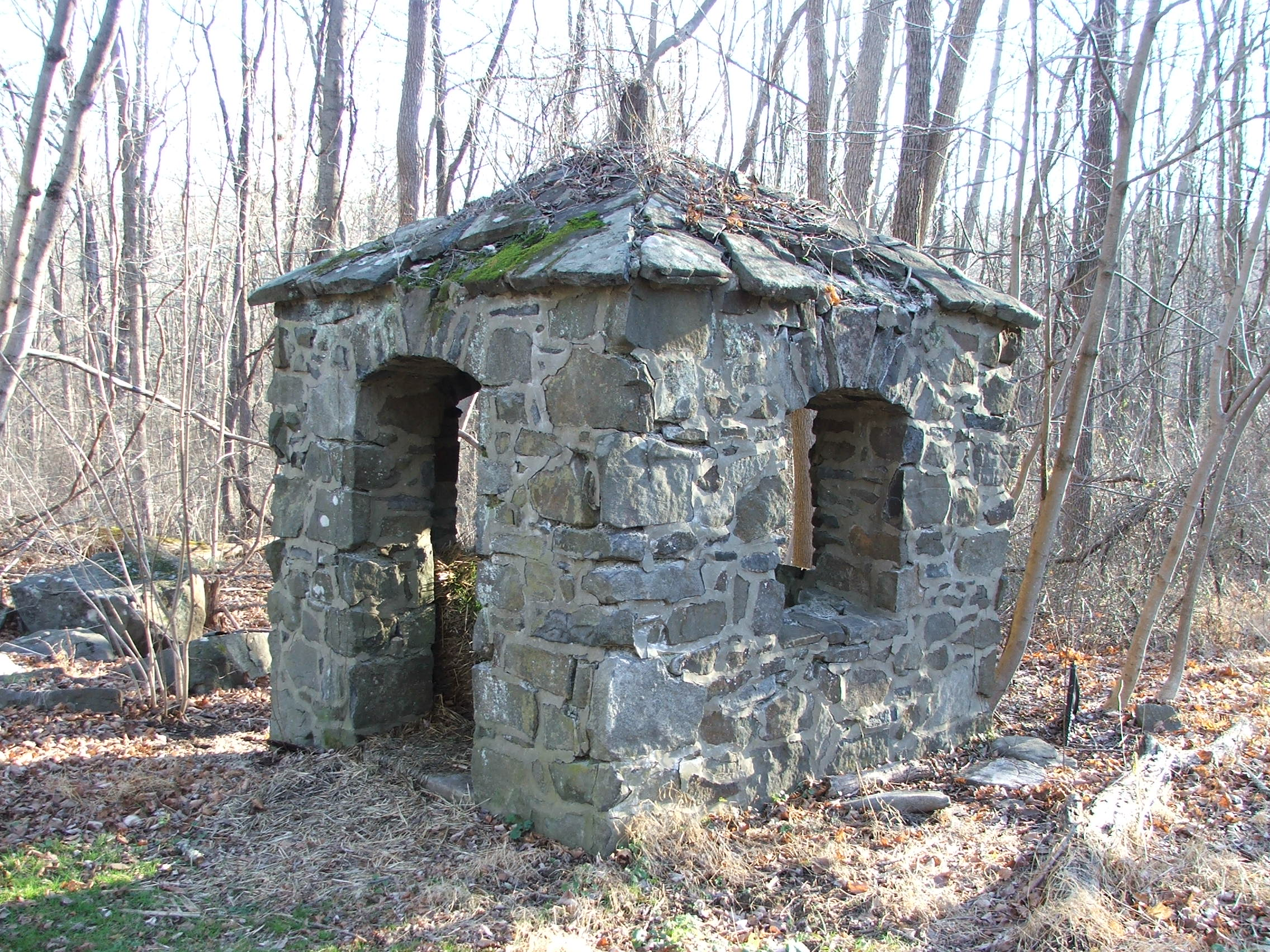
Pavilion constructed of fieldstone in Pennsylvania, United States

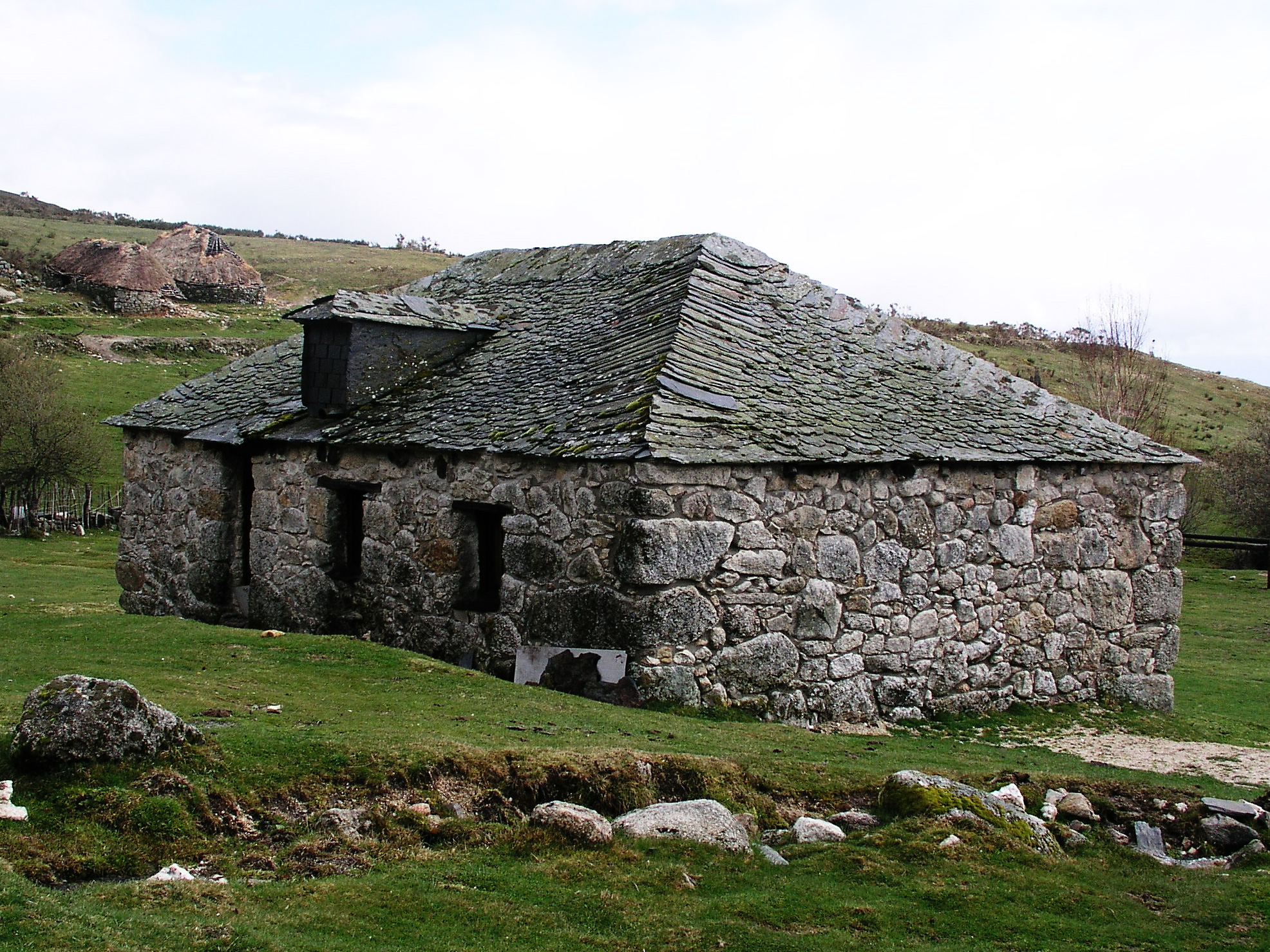
Fieldstone house in León, Spain

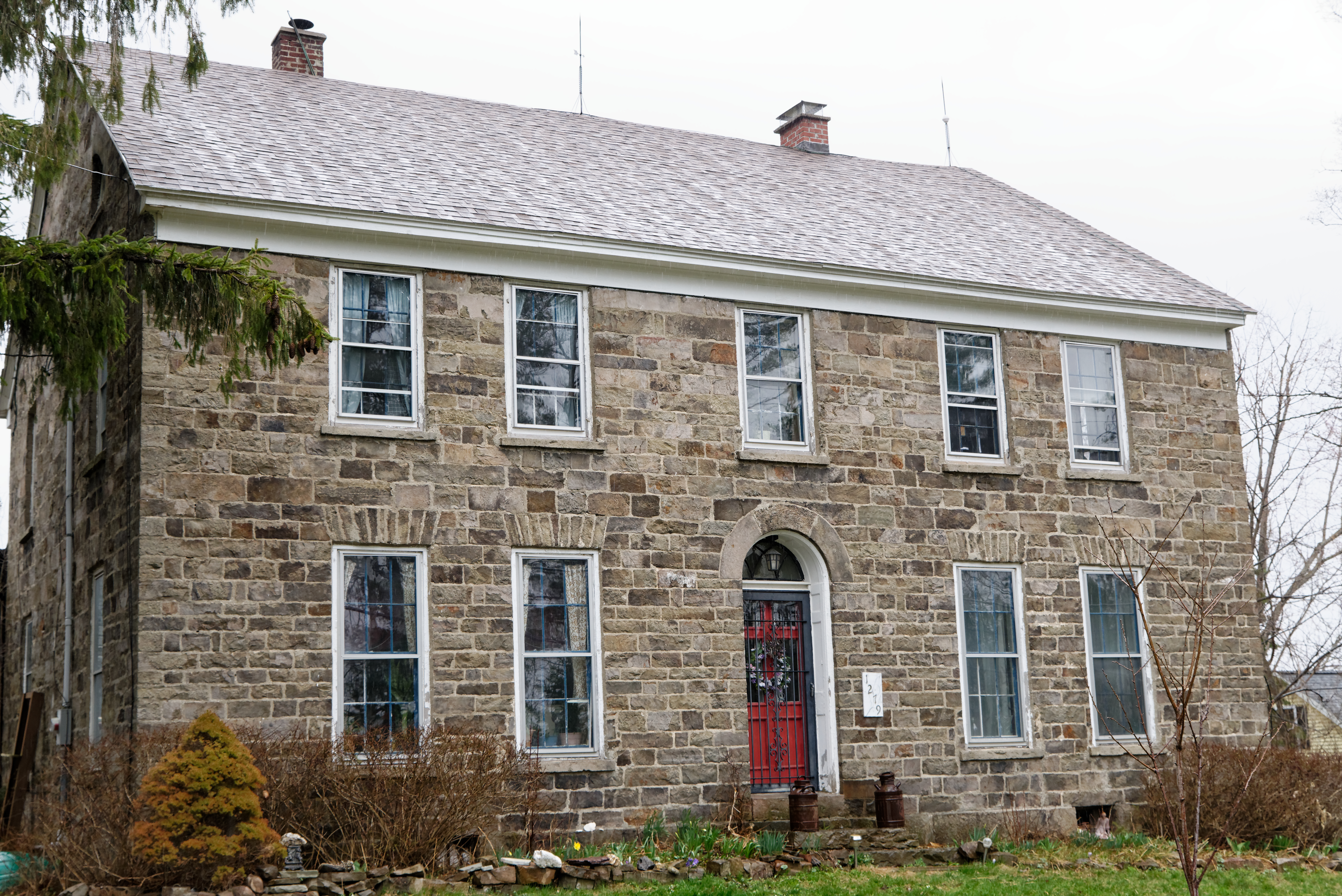
Remington House (Kinne Corners, New York)

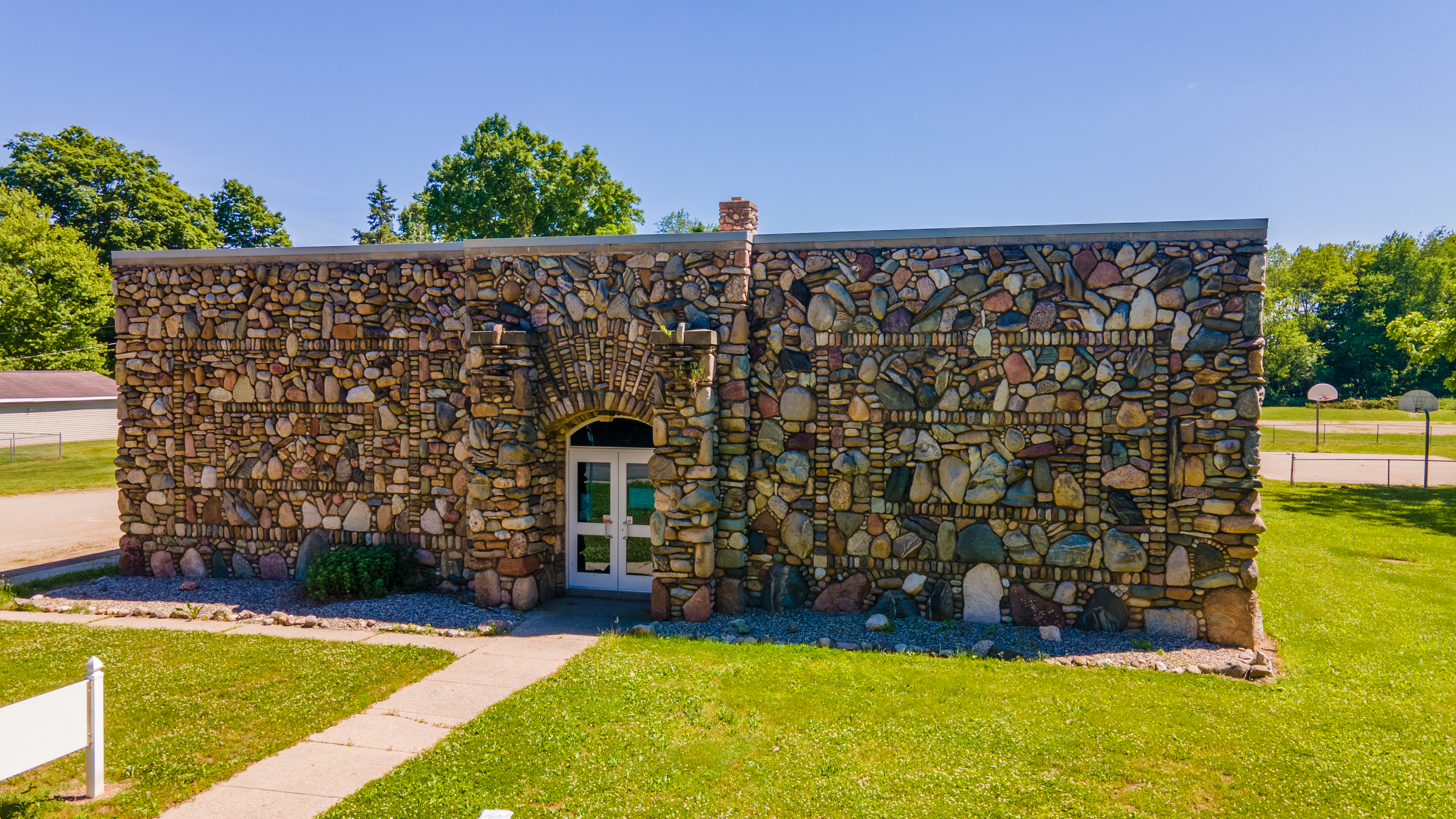
Leonidas Stone School,(Leonidas, Michigan)

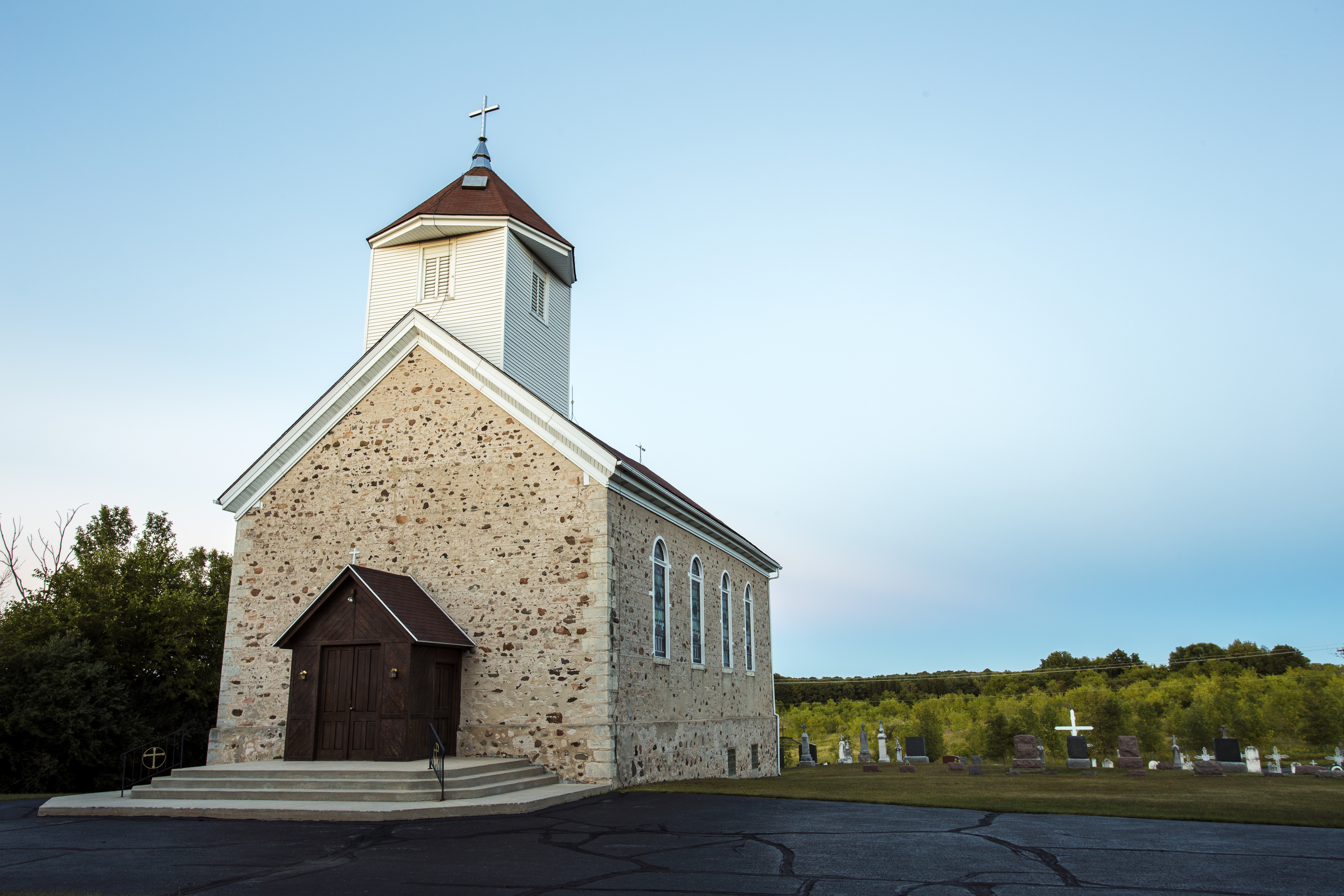
Mortared fieldstone of St. Augustine Catholic Church in Trenton, Wisconsin.

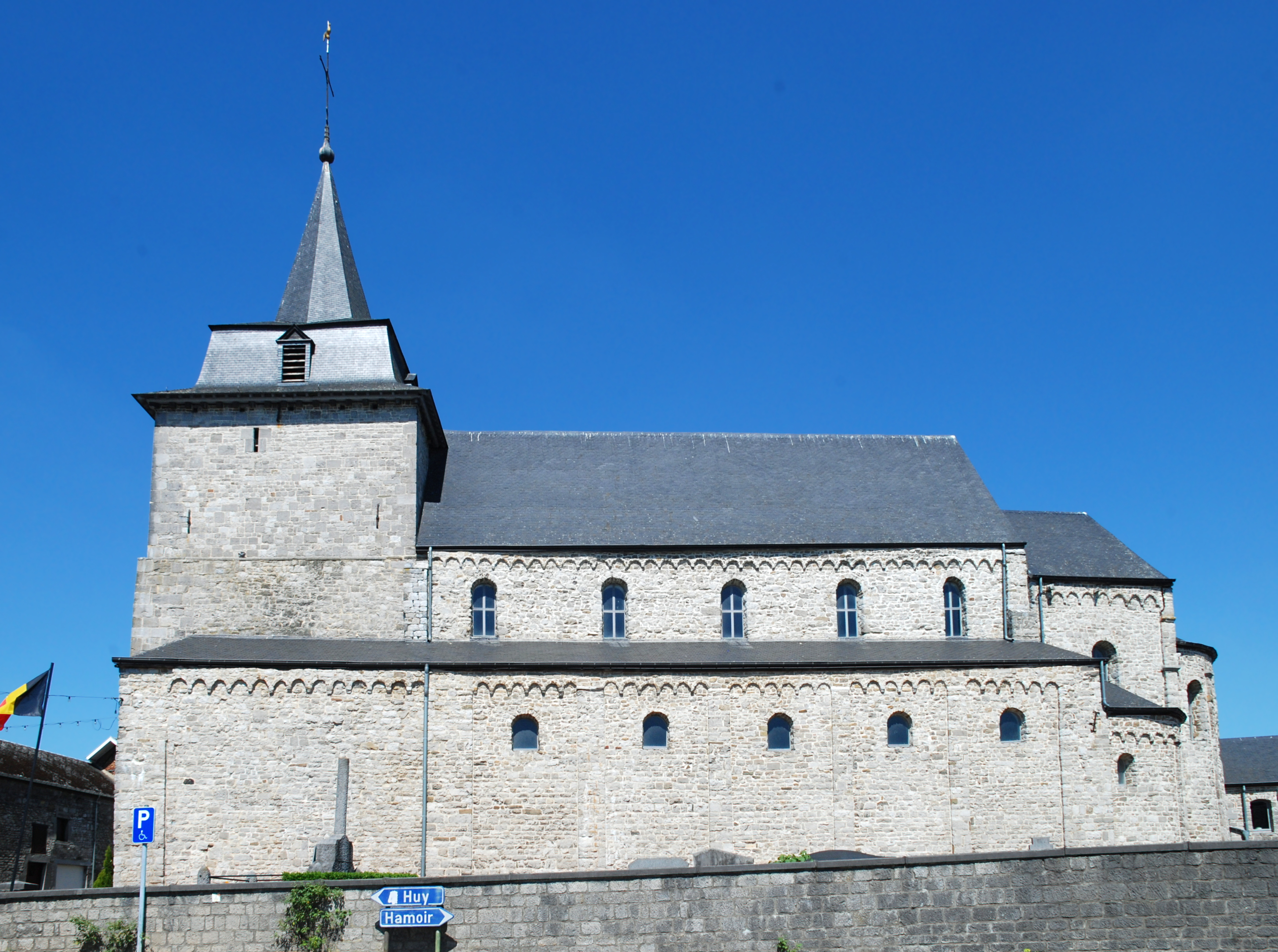
Church of Saint Remaclus, Belgium. A Romanesque church built of fieldstone.

== See also ==
- Dry-stone wall
- Earl Young (architect)
- Stone wall
- Stonemasonry
- Architecture
