= National Register of Historic Places listings in Hennepin County, Minnesota =

Location of Hennepin County in Minnesota

This list is of the properties and historic districts which are designated on the National Register of Historic Places or that were formerly so designated, in Hennepin County, Minnesota; there are 196 entries as of May 2026. A significant number of these properties are a result of the establishment of Fort Snelling, the development of water power at Saint Anthony Falls, and the thriving city of Minneapolis that developed around the falls. Many historic sites outside the Minneapolis city limits are associated with pioneers who established missions, farms, and schools in areas that are now suburbs in that metropolitan area.

== Historical background ==
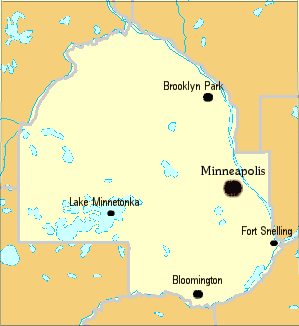
Hennepin County

Father Louis Hennepin was the first European explorer to visit and name Saint Anthony Falls, the tallest waterfall on the Mississippi River, in 1680. While the falls were familiar to the Ojibwe and Sioux Indians who lived in the area, Father Hennepin spread word of the falls when he returned to France in 1683. The land east of the Mississippi came under England's control in 1763, and then became American territory after the American Revolutionary War in 1783. After the Louisiana Purchase in 1803, the western side of the falls became American territory as well.

Zebulon Pike explored the Mississippi River in 1805 and made a treaty with the Sioux to acquire land on either side of the Mississippi River from its confluence with the Minnesota River to Saint Anthony Falls. The United States did not do much to occupy the land until 1819, when Lieutenant Colonel Henry Leavenworth was ordered to establish a military post in the area. The following year, Colonel Josiah Snelling established a permanent fort at a blufftop site overlooking Pike Island and the confluence of the Mississippi and Minnesota Rivers. The fort, first named Fort Saint Anthony and later Fort Snelling, became an island of civilization in the wilderness.

In 1837, Franklin Steele established a claim for the land on the east side of Saint Anthony Falls. Within the next ten years, he established a sawmill at the falls, and lumbermen from the north began cutting trees and sending them to Steele's sawmill. In 1849, Steele subdivided his property and filed a plat for the town of Saint Anthony. Sawmilling and early flour milling attempts proved successful, and by 1855 the fledgling town of Saint Anthony had more than three thousand residents. The west side of the river was part of the Fort Snelling military reservation until it was released for development in 1854. In 1849, John H. Stevens obtained 160 acres (0.65 km^{2}) of land on the west side of the falls in exchange for maintaining a ferry at the falls. Hennepin County was established in 1852, and the settlement on the west side of the river was given the name Minneapolis, as coined by Charles Hoag. The two towns prospered as a result of industries and businesses based around the falls, but business was better on the west side of the falls. Minneapolis incorporated as a city in 1867, and three years later it merged with the village of Saint Anthony.

Eventually, flour mills overtook sawmills as a dominant industry at the falls. In 1860, flour production stood at 30,000 barrels; it reached 256,100 barrels in 1869. By 1874, Charles A. Pillsbury and Company owned five mills at the falls, and in 1879, Washburn-Crosby Company (now General Mills) owned four mills. The former Washburn "A" Mill building on the west side of the falls exploded on May 2, 1878, but its owners quickly rebuilt the west side district, including a new, larger Washburn "A" Mill. Meanwhile, in 1880, Pillsbury began building the huge Pillsbury "A" Mill on the east side of the falls. It had a capacity of 4,000 barrels per day when it first opened. Improvements in milling technology made it possible to grind the tougher spring wheat into a finer product, producing Minnesota "patent" flour, the finest bread flour in the world at that time. By 1900, Minneapolis was grinding 14.1 percent of the world's grain.

== Current listings ==
This National Park Service list is complete through NPS recent listings posted October 30, 2026.

	Name on the Register	Image	Date listed	Location	City or town	Description
1	Abbott Hospital	Abbott Hospital	June 1, 2011 (#11000323)	110 E. 18th St. 44°57′56″N 93°16′34″W	Minneapolis	Hospital building constructed in five phases 1910–1958, reflecting the growing specialization and sophistication of the medical industry in the 20th century. Also a contributing property to the Stevens Square Historic District.
2	Advance Thresher/Emerson-Newton Implement Company	Advance Thresher/Emerson-Newton Implement Company	September 20, 1977 (#77000736)	700–704 S. 3rd St. 44°58′36″N 93°15′32″W	Minneapolis	Adjoining 1900 and 1904 buildings exemplifying the Sullivanesque style influencing large industrial and commercial properties at the turn of the 20th century.
3	Alano Society of Minneapolis Clubhouse	Alano Society of Minneapolis Clubhouse	October 13, 2021 (#100007071)	2218 1st Ave. S. 44°57′36″N 93°16′37″W	Minneapolis	Headquarters 1942–1968 of Minnesota's first and most influential chapter of Alcoholics Anonymous, based in an 1887 house with 1916 and 1950 additions.
4	Ames-Florida House	Ames-Florida House	October 16, 1979 (#79003714)	8131 Bridge St. 45°05′12″N 93°43′54″W	Rockford	1856 Greek Revival house of the mill owners who founded Rockford. Now a museum.
5	Anoka-Champlin Mississippi River Bridge	Anoka-Champlin Mississippi River Bridge	December 31, 1979 (#79001181)	U.S. Route 169 over Mississippi River; 45°11′30″N 93°23′43″W	Champlin	1929 example of the open-spandrel concrete arch bridges developed in the Twin Cities area in the late 1920s; also noted for providing a key connection between two river communities. Extends into Anoka County.
6	Architects and Engineers Building	Architects and Engineers Building	February 23, 1984 (#84001414)	1200 2nd Ave. S. 44°58′15″N 93°16′26″W	Minneapolis	1920 joint office building for design professionals, noted for its exceptional Renaissance Revival architecture by Hewitt and Brown and association with several leading architects, engineers, and interior designers.
7	George W. Baird House	George W. Baird House	March 27, 1980 (#80002067)	4400 W. 50th St. 44°54′47″N 93°20′13″W	Edina	1886 Queen Anne house designed by noted Minneapolis architect Charles S. Sedgwick for George and Sarah Baird, early settlers and Grange leaders.
8	Bardwell-Ferrant House	Bardwell-Ferrant House	August 9, 1984 (#84001416)	2500 Portland Ave. S. 44°57′26″N 93°16′05″W	Minneapolis	Circa-1883 house given a Moorish Revival remodel in 1890; a picturesque local example of the late-19th-century fascination with exoticism.
9	Riley Lucas Bartholomew House	Riley Lucas Bartholomew House	November 28, 1978 (#78001545)	6901 Lyndale Ave. S. 44°52′39″N 93°17′18″W	Richfield	Circa-1853 house of prominent early Minnesotan Riley Bartholomew (1807–1894), a justice of the peace, delegate to the Minnesota Constitutional Convention, state senator, and volunteer soldier during the Dakota War of 1862. Now a museum.
10	Basilica of St. Mary	Basilica of St. Mary	March 26, 1975 (#75000985)	1600 Hennepin Ave. 44°58′23″N 93°17′11″W	Minneapolis	Landmark church built 1907–14 concurrently with the Cathedral of Saint Paul; noted for its exemplary Baroque Revival architecture, association with Minnesota's religious heritage, and honor as the first Catholic basilica proclaimed in the United States.
11	Bennett-McBride House	Bennett-McBride House	September 19, 1977 (#77000737)	3116 3rd Ave. S. 44°56′46″N 93°16′24″W	Minneapolis	Exemplary Queen Anne house built in 1891, particularly noted for the preservation of its interior and exterior millwork. Also a contributing property to the Healy Block Residential Historic District.
12	Fredrika Bremer Intermediate School	Fredrika Bremer Intermediate School	January 31, 1978 (#78001536)	1214 Lowry Ave. N. 45°00′49″N 93°17′42″W	Minneapolis	Minneapolis's oldest intact school, dating to 1886; representative of the 19th-century emphasis on education through its castle-like architecture and origin during a frenzy of construction by Minneapolis Public Schools.
13	Bridge No. 90646	Bridge No. 90646	February 2, 2016 (#15001016)	Spanning Minnehaha Creek on Wooddale Ave. 44°54′42″N 93°20′21″W	Edina	Exemplary 1937 arch bridge built by the Works Progress Administration with a novel modular metal substructure and rustic, Platteville Limestone masonry.
14	Charles H. Burwell House	Charles H. Burwell House	May 2, 1974 (#74001025)	13209 E. McGinty Rd. 44°56′29″N 93°26′53″W	Minnetonka	1883 Carpenter Gothic/Stick style house and outbuildings built by the manager of the Minnetonka Mills Company, the first mill west of Minneapolis and nucleus of the first town in western Hennepin County. Now a house museum and park.
15	Butler Brothers Company	Butler Brothers Company	March 11, 1971 (#71000437)	518 1st Ave. N. 44°58′48″N 93°16′30″W	Minneapolis	Exemplary Chicago School warehouse/office building designed by Minneapolis architect Harry Wild Jones and constructed 1906–8. Now known as Butler Square.
16	Buzza Company Building	Buzza Company Building	January 24, 2012 (#11001039)	1006 W. Lake St. 44°56′55″N 93°17′32″W	Minneapolis	One of the nation's few surviving factories associated with the early greeting card industry, in use 1923–1942; also noted for its wartime conversion to producing crucial military optics 1942–1946.
17	Cahill School	Cahill School	October 9, 1970 (#70000297)	4924 Eden Ave. 44°54′39″N 93°20′59″W	Edina	1864 example of the one-room schoolhouses built across rural Minnesota in the 19th century. Now managed by the Edina Historical Society alongside the Minnehaha Grange Hall.
18	Calhoun Beach Club	Calhoun Beach Club	December 23, 2003 (#03001335)	2730 W. Lake St. 44°57′00″N 93°18′55″W	Minneapolis	Apartment hotel primarily built 1928–29, a rare local example of a distinctive urban housing option of the 1920s.
19	Calvary Baptist Church	Calvary Baptist Church	May 19, 2021 (#100006586)	2608 Blaisdell Ave. S. 44°57′19″N 93°16′48″W	Minneapolis	1889 Romanesque Akron Plan church with 1903 and 1928 additions, a highly intact example of the work of architects Warren H. Hayes and Harry Wild Jones.
20	Calvary Lutheran Church	Calvary Lutheran Church	April 7, 2022 (#100007577)	3901 Chicago Ave. 44°55′56″N 93°15′44″W	Minneapolis	1930 church with a 1953 addition, an exemplary work of the prolific Minneapolis architectural firm of Lang and Raugland.
21	Cameron Transfer and Storage Company Building	Cameron Transfer and Storage Company Building	July 14, 2014 (#14000390)	756 N. 4th St. 44°59′14″N 93°16′49″W	Minneapolis	Warehouse built 1909–1911 in sections that juxtapose traditional timber framing with newly developed reinforced concrete construction, encapsulating a major shift in early-20th-century warehouse engineering.
22	Cappelen Memorial Bridge	Cappelen Memorial Bridge	November 28, 1978 (#78001537)	Franklin Ave. and the Mississippi River; 44°57′49″N 93°13′23″W	Minneapolis	Leading example of the Twin Cities' renowned concrete arch bridges of the 1920s, whose 435-foot (133 m) main span was the world's longest of its type upon completion in 1923. Better known as the Franklin Avenue Bridge.
23	Elbert L. Carpenter House	Elbert L. Carpenter House	September 13, 1977 (#77000738)	314 Clifton Ave. 44°57′59″N 93°17′03″W	Minneapolis	1906 house of Elbert Carpenter (1862–1945), a lumber executive and founding sponsor of the Minneapolis Symphony Orchestra. Also noted for its Georgian Revival design by William Channing Whitney.
24	Eugene J. Carpenter House	Eugene J. Carpenter House	September 13, 1977 (#77001566)	300 Clifton Ave. 44°57′58″N 93°17′00″W	Minneapolis	1906 house of Eugene Carpenter (1865–1922), a notable lumber executive and patron of the Minneapolis Institute of Arts.
25	J.I. Case Building	J.I. Case Building	May 17, 2021 (#100006558)	233 Park Ave. 44°58′39″N 93°15′31″W	Minneapolis	Warehouse occupied 1907–1958 by the J. I. Case Threshing Machine Company, one of the nation's leading farm equipment manufacturers. Also noted for anchoring a new warehouse district in a previously disreputable part of Minneapolis.
26	Cedar Avenue Bridge	Cedar Avenue Bridge	November 6, 1989 (#89001845)	10th Ave. over the Mississippi River; 44°58′43″N 93°14′38″W	Minneapolis	Leading example, completed in 1929, of the monumental reinforced-concrete arch bridges built to span the Twin Cities' high river bluffs at the beginning of the automobile era; the master work of engineer Kristoffer Olsen Oustad. Now the 10th Avenue Bridge.
27	Cedar Square West	Cedar Square West	December 28, 2010 (#10001090)	1600 S. 6th St. 44°58′08″N 93°14′54″W	Minneapolis	Prominent six-building apartment complex constructed 1970–74, a nationally significant example of urban renewal as the first project funded under Title VII. Also noted as a major work of Minneapolis architect Ralph Rapson. Now known as Riverside Plaza.
28	Loren L. Chadwick Cottages	Loren L. Chadwick Cottages	February 9, 1984 (#84001417)	2617 W. 40th St. 44°55′49″N 93°18′50″W	Minneapolis	Two tiny 1902 cottages, unique examples of the simple summer lodgings built in the Minneapolis lake district. Joined as a single residence in the 1970s.
29	Chamber of Commerce Building	Chamber of Commerce Building	November 23, 1977 (#95000821)	400 4th St. S. 44°58′39″N 93°15′49″W	Minneapolis	Long-serving commodity marketplace that helped make Minneapolis a major international grain trade center, with three buildings constructed 1902–28. Also noted architecturally for the city's first steel building and one of its few Sullivanesque designs. Renamed the Minneapolis Grain Exchange in 1947.
30	Chicago, Milwaukee and St. Paul Railroad Grade Separation	Chicago, Milwaukee and St. Paul Railroad Grade Separation	June 1, 2005 (#05000508)	Parallel to 29th St. between Humboldt and 20th Aves. S. 44°57′01″N 93°16′18″W	Minneapolis	2.8-mile (4.5 km) trench and 28 bridges built 1912–1916 to separate rail and street traffic, an urban planning accomplishment to improve both safety and industry. Now part of the Midtown Greenway rail trail.
31	Chicago, Milwaukee, St. Paul and Pacific Depot	Chicago, Milwaukee, St. Paul and Pacific Depot	November 25, 1969 (#69000072)	W. 37th St. and Brunswick Ave. 44°56′13″N 93°21′29″W	St. Louis Park	1887 railway station that served as the primary local connection to Minneapolis; one of St. Louis Park's few surviving early buildings and a symbol of its growth. Now a museum.
32	Chicago, Milwaukee, St. Paul and Pacific Depot Freight House and Train Shed	Chicago, Milwaukee, St. Paul and Pacific Depot Freight House and Train Shed	November 28, 1978 (#78001542)	201 3rd Ave. S. 44°58′48″N 93°15′48″W	Minneapolis	Minneapolis' oldest surviving railway station, built 1897–9, with an earlier 1879 freight house. Also significant for their architecture, association with the milling district, and preservation of one of the nation's few remaining truss-roofed train sheds. Now a commercial complex known as The Depot.
33	Christ Church Lutheran	Christ Church Lutheran	June 20, 2001 (#01000654)	3244 34th Ave. S. 44°56′37″N 93°13′24″W	Minneapolis	Nationally influential modernist church built 1948–9; the master work of major 20th-century architect Eliel Saarinen, with a 1962 addition by his equally prominent son Eero Saarinen.
34	Church of the Incarnation and Rectory	Church of the Incarnation and Rectory	January 11, 2022 (#100007352)	3801–3817 Pleasant Ave. 44°56′02″N 93°16′57″W	Minneapolis	Roman Catholic church complex built 1913–1932, a locally distinctive example of early-20th-century architectural eclecticism.
35	Church of St. Stephen (Catholic)	Church of St. Stephen (Catholic)	August 15, 1991 (#91001058)	2201 Clinton Ave. S. 44°57′39″N 93°16′16″W	Minneapolis	Well preserved early example of a Richardsonian Romanesque/Romanesque Revival church, built 1889–1891.
36	Amos B. Coe House	Amos B. Coe House	January 12, 1984 (#84001418)	1700 S. 3rd Ave. 44°57′58″N 93°16′23″W	Minneapolis	1884 house and 1886 carriage house exemplifying the Queen Anne residences of the late-19th-century upper-middle class.
37	Coliseum Building and Hall	Coliseum Building and Hall	March 24, 2022 (#100007557)	2708 E. Lake St. 44°56′55″N 93°13′58″W	Minneapolis	Commercial building with an event hall, constructed in 1917 and expanded multiple times. Anchor of a prominent 20th-century commercial district in Longfellow, Minneapolis.
38	Como-Harriet Streetcar Line and Trolley	Como-Harriet Streetcar Line and Trolley	October 17, 1977 (#77000739)	42nd St. W. and Queen Ave. S. 44°55′40″N 93°18′35″W	Minneapolis	1908 streetcar and restored .5-mile (0.80 km) track, a working remnant of the Twin Cities' major public transit system until 1954. Now operated by the Minnesota Streetcar Museum.
39	Country Club Historic District	Country Club Historic District	April 26, 1982 (#82002958)	Roughly bounded by 45th St., Arden Ave., 50th St., and Browndale Ave. 44°55′00″N 93°20′24″W	Edina	Suburban residential district established in 1922, one of Minnesota's first comprehensive planned communities and the prototype for Edina's housing developments. Also noted for its homogeneous Period Revival architecture.
40	Crane Island Historic District	Crane Island Historic District	August 5, 1991 (#91001005)	Crane Island in Lake Minnetonka; 44°54′02″N 93°39′45″W	Minnetrista	Island with 14 turn-of-the-20th-century summer cottages, representative of the era's rise in white-collar jobs, inter-urban rail transit for commuting, and the adoption of seasonal residences among Minnesota's middle class.
41	John R. Cummins Farmhouse	John R. Cummins Farmhouse	September 2, 1982 (#82002957)	13600 Pioneer Trail; 44°49′48″N 93°26′56″W	Eden Prairie	Rare surviving example of a southern Hennepin County farmhouse, built in 1879 and expanded in 1910; owned by a noted local horticulturalist and diarist (1834–1921).
42	B. O. Cutter House	B. O. Cutter House	January 30, 1976 (#76001058)	400 10th Ave. SE. 44°58′58″N 93°14′27″W	Minneapolis	Only surviving example of the Twin Cities' once-common Carpenter Gothic cottages, built by master carpenter B.O. Cutter for himself in 1856 and later owned by early Minneapolis leading citizen John Gilfillan (1835–1924).
43	Dayton's Department Store	Dayton's Department Store	July 1, 2019 (#100004147)	700 Nicollet Mall; 44°58′36″N 93°16′21″W	Minneapolis	First Dayton's department store, built in 1902 and expanded multiple times in the 20th century; the flagship location and corporate headquarters of an influential local retailer.
44	District No. 99 School	District No. 99 School	January 4, 2024 (#100009722)	10980 West River Rd. 45°09′14″N 93°20′25″W	Champlin	One-room school active 1876–1947; the only venue for formal education available to most local youths in what was then a rural township. Also known as the Dunning School.
45	District No. 107 School	District No. 107 School	November 1, 2018 (#100003081)	22995 County Rd. 10; 45°07′24″N 93°37′31″W	Corcoran	1894 one-room school with its original outhouses, embodying local efforts to provide education in rural Hennepin County. Also known as the Burschville School.
46	East Lake Branch Library	East Lake Branch Library	May 26, 2000 (#00000542)	2916 E. Lake St. 44°56′55″N 93°13′45″W	Minneapolis	1924 branch library associated with the influential evolution of Minneapolis Public Library 1894–1936, and its nationally renowned director Gratia Countryman (1866–1953).
47	Eitel Hospital	Eitel Hospital	December 27, 2007 (#07001313)	1367 Willow St. 44°58′09″N 93°16′54″W	Minneapolis	1911 surgical hospital associated with a major evolutionary period in hospitals, and with influential local medical professionals George G. (1858–1928) and Jeanette Eitel (1875–1951).
48	Excelsior Commercial Historic District	Excelsior Commercial Historic District	October 20, 2021 (#100007070)	Roughly bounded by Lake St., West Dr., 3rd St., and East Dr. 44°54′13″N 93°33′58″W	Excelsior	Two-block business district reflecting Exelsior's early years as a tourist destination and its mid-20th-century suburban diversification, with 32 contributing properties built 1886–1958.
49	Excelsior Public School	Excelsior Public School	November 13, 1980 (#80002068)	261 School Ave. 44°54′05″N 93°33′53″W	Excelsior	Landmark school building constructed 1899–1901, symbolizing the maturation of Excelsior via its refined architecture and prominent siting.
50	Farmers and Mechanics Savings Bank	Farmers and Mechanics Savings Bank	January 12, 1984 (#84001419)	115 S. 4th St. 44°58′43″N 93°16′04″W	Minneapolis	Bank building constructed 1891–92 and remodeled in 1908, significant as a prominent early example of the Beaux-Arts/Neoclassical style that became popular in Minneapolis. Now houses a strip club.
51	Farmers and Mechanics Savings Bank	Farmers and Mechanics Savings Bank	March 2, 2006 (#06000094)	88 S. 6th St. 44°58′40″N 93°16′13″W	Minneapolis	Minnesota's only long-lived mutual savings bank, whose 1942 relocation to this building and prominent 1963 addition also convey the flight from and then stand against mid-20th-century urban decay in downtown Minneapolis as well as the architectural shift from Streamline Moderne to International Style.
52	Fawkes Auto Complex	Fawkes Auto Complex	May 7, 2026 (#100012964)	1625–1645 Hennepin Ave. and 1620–1628 Harmon Pl. 44°58′18″N 93°17′10″W	Minneapolis	Automotive sales and service complex active 1911–1931, with four buildings and an alley illustrating the explosive growth of the early-20th-century automobile industry.
53	Fire Station No. 19	Fire Station No. 19	January 14, 1982 (#82002960)	2001 University Ave. SE. 44°58′34″N 93°13′37″W	Minneapolis	1893 fire station representative of late-19th/early-20th-century design during the last years of horse-drawn equipment. Also significant as the site where kittenball, a forerunner of softball, originated among exercising firefighters seeking a more compact form of baseball.
54	First Church of Christ, Scientist	First Church of Christ, Scientist	June 20, 1986 (#86001340)	614–620 E. 15th St. 44°58′06″N 93°16′00″W	Minneapolis	1897 church noted for its exemplary small-scale Beaux-Arts architecture and status as the first Christian Science church in the Upper Midwest. Fell into disrepair and demolished in 2022.
55	First Congregational Church	First Congregational Church	January 15, 1979 (#79001249)	500 8th Ave. SE. 44°59′06″N 93°14′34″W	Minneapolis	1886 Richardsonian Romanesque church designed by Warren H. Hayes on the Akron Plan for Minnesota's first congregational church, established in 1851 and noted for its community involvement.
56	First National Bank–Soo Line Building	First National Bank–Soo Line Building	May 12, 2008 (#08000402)	101 S. 5th St. 44°58′40″N 93°16′09″W	Minneapolis	1915 office building significant as the headquarters for two of the city's major companies: the First National Bank of Minneapolis and the Minneapolis, St. Paul and Sault Ste. Marie Railroad.
57	First Presbyterian Church of Oak Grove Cemetery	First Presbyterian Church of Oak Grove Cemetery	November 24, 2014 (#14000956)	10340 Lyndale Ave. S. 44°48′55″N 93°17′23″W	Bloomington	Cemetery established in 1856 whose pioneer and Dakota burials and 1890 soldiers' monument reflect Bloomington's transition from frontier settlement to participant in state affairs like military service.
58	Woodbury Fisk House	Woodbury Fisk House	October 6, 1983 (#83003654)	424 5th St. SE. 44°59′11″N 93°14′53″W	Minneapolis	One of Minneapolis's leading examples of Italian Villa architecture, built circa 1870.
59	Flour Exchange Building	Flour Exchange Building	August 29, 1977 (#77000740)	310 4th Ave. S. 44°58′42″N 93°15′50″W	Minneapolis	High-rise office building begun in 1892 and completed in 1909, the first in Minneapolis to be designed in unadorned commercial style architecture.
60	Fort Snelling	Fort Snelling	October 15, 1966 (#66000401)	Bounded by Minnehaha Park, the Mississippi River, the airport, and Bloomington Rd. 44°53′34″N 93°10′51″W	Minneapolis	Military complex established in 1819 and in use till 1946, instrumental in the development of the Upper Midwest and in the transition of the U.S. Army from a small frontier force into a major army. Extends into Dakota County.
61	Fort Snelling National Cemetery	Fort Snelling National Cemetery	March 8, 2016 (#16000060)	7601 34th Ave. S. 44°52′20″N 93°13′09″W	Minneapolis	National cemetery dating to 1939, one of seven established in the years after World War I in a major expansion of the national cemetery program due to the increased number of veterans and dwindling burial space elsewhere.
62	Fort Snelling–Mendota Bridge	Fort Snelling–Mendota Bridge	December 1, 1978 (#78001534)	Minnesota Highway 55 over the Minnesota River; 44°53′15″N 93°10′39″W	Minneapolis	4,119-foot (1,255 m) bridge constructed 1925–26, noted for its sophisticated design and original status as the world's longest continuous concrete arch bridge. Extends into Dakota County.
63	Foshay Tower	Foshay Tower	September 20, 1978 (#78001538)	821 Marquette Ave. 44°58′28″N 93°16′18″W	Minneapolis	Lavish office building constructed 1927–29 to be Minneapolis's tallest skyscraper; noted for its unique obelisk-shaped design and its embodiment of the conspicuous consumption of the Roaring Twenties.
64	Lawrence A. and Mary Fournier House	Lawrence A. and Mary Fournier House	May 18, 1995 (#95000618)	3505 Sheridan Ave. N. 45°01′08″N 93°18′44″W	Minneapolis	1910 bungalow exhibiting the emergence of Prairie School architecture within the Arts and Crafts movement.
65	Fowler Methodist Episcopal Church	Fowler Methodist Episcopal Church	January 30, 1976 (#76001062)	2011 Dupont Ave. S. 44°57′45″N 93°17′34″W	Minneapolis	Church begun by Warren H. Hayes in 1894 and completed by Harry Wild Jones in 1906, the only combined work of these major Minnesota architects. Also a symbol of the community works of the Scottish Rite since becoming the Scottish Rite Temple in 1915.
66	Franklin Branch Library	Franklin Branch Library	May 26, 2000 (#00000545)	1314 E. Franklin Ave. 44°57′47″N 93°15′21″W	Minneapolis	1914 Carnegie library associated with the influential evolution of Minneapolis Public Library 1894–1936, and its nationally renowned director Gratia Countryman (1866–1953).
67	Gethsemane Episcopal Church	Gethsemane Episcopal Church	March 8, 1984 (#84001424)	901-905 4th Ave. S. 44°58′20″N 93°16′06″W	Minneapolis	1884 church noted for its Gothic Revival architecture and its status as one of the oldest surviving churches in Minneapolis.
68	Peter Gideon Farmhouse	Peter Gideon Farmhouse	September 17, 1974 (#74001019)	24590 Glen Rd. 44°54′13″N 93°35′32″W	Shorewood	House and orchard where horticulturalist Peter Gideon (1820–1899) experimented beginning in 1854 to produce winter-hearty fruit trees, succeeding most notably with the Wealthy apple.
69	Glen Lake Children's Camp	Glen Lake Children's Camp	August 5, 1999 (#99000932)	6350 Indian Chief Rd. 44°53′16″N 93°27′55″W	Eden Prairie	One of the nation's few surviving examples of a summer camp for children with tuberculosis, active 1925–1950, with five contributing properties. Also noted for its association with the Glen Lake Sanatorium and philanthropists George and Leonora Christian. Now Camp Eden Wood.
70	John G. and Minnie Gluek House and Carriage House	John G. and Minnie Gluek House and Carriage House	February 9, 1990 (#90000103)	2447 Bryant Ave. S. 44°57′27″N 93°17′25″W	Minneapolis	Influential Georgian Revival house and carriage house, both built in 1902, the former by important local residential architect William Kenyon.
71	Grace Evangelical Lutheran Church	Grace Evangelical Lutheran Church	January 9, 1997 (#96001557)	324 Harvard St. SE. 44°58′22″N 93°13′50″W	Minneapolis	Church of a Swedish American congregation built 1915–17, noted for its Gothic Revival architecture and deliberate Americanization efforts to attract younger members not socially reliant on an ethnic church.
72	Graeser Roadside Parking Area	Graeser Roadside Parking Area	August 4, 2016 (#100012382)	Northwestern side of TH 100 between W. Broadway Avenue (CR 8) and Bottineau Boulevard (CSAH 81); 45°02′11″N 93°20′41″W	Robbinsdale	Wayside park built 1940–1941, noted for its distinctive National Park Service rustic design by Arthur R. Nichols, with 16 contributing properties including a beehive-shaped fireplace and a complex rock garden.
73	Grain Belt Beer Sign	Grain Belt Beer Sign	August 4, 2016 (#16000511)	4 Island Ave. W. 44°59′10″N 93°15′48″W	Minneapolis	Billboard installed in 1950, a local landmark and the only surviving large, free-standing, 20th-century advertisement for Grain Belt Beer, an enduringly popular Minnesota brand.
74	Great Northern Implement Company	Great Northern Implement Company	September 13, 1977 (#77000745)	616 S. 3rd St. 44°58′37″N 93°15′35″W	Minneapolis	1910 commercial/industrial building noted for its highly restrained ornamentation, inspired by the work of influential architect Louis Sullivan. Also known as the Pittsburgh Plate Glass Company Building.
75	Great Northern Railroad Depot	Great Northern Railroad Depot	July 7, 1981 (#81000322)	402 E. Lake St. 44°58′12″N 93°30′59″W	Wayzata	1906 passenger/freight depot noted for its architecture and association with Wayzata's late-19th-century opposition to and early-20th-century embrace of the Great Northern Railway's route along its lakeside downtown. Now houses a museum.
76	Jonathan Taylor Grimes House	Jonathan Taylor Grimes House	March 16, 1976 (#76001056)	4200 W. 44th St. 44°55′16″N 93°20′14″W	Edina	1869 Gothic Revival house of an early Minnesota horticulturalist (1818–1903), who supplied Minneapolis with many of its shade trees and planted the first ginkgo and catalpa trees in the state.
77	Hagel Family Farm	Hagel Family Farm	December 27, 2006 (#06001182)	11475 Tilton Trail S. 45°09′46″N 93°34′10″W	Rogers	Unusually intact example of the diversified family farms that characterized Minnesota agriculture in the late 19th and first half of the 20th centuries. Established circa 1855, with 18 contributing properties mostly built in the 1890s.
78	Hanover Bridge	Hanover Bridge	December 11, 1979 (#79001268)	Off County Highway 19 over the Crow River; 45°09′12″N 93°39′43″W	Hanover	Oldest and most intact example—built in 1885—of the pin-connected Pratt truss bridges once common in the area. Now restricted to pedestrian traffic. Extends into Wright County.
79	Healy Block Residential Historic District	Healy Block Residential Historic District	May 27, 1993 (#93000417)	3101–3145 2nd Ave. S. and 3116–3124 3rd Ave. S. 44°56′45″N 93°16′25″W	Minneapolis	14 similar houses built 1886–1898 by contractor Theron P. Healy, exemplifying the phenomenon of upper-middle-class residential blocks designed and built by single contractors during Minneapolis's late-19th-century boom years.
80	Hennepin County Library	Hennepin County Library	October 2, 1978 (#78001546)	4915 N. 42nd Ave. 45°01′52″N 93°20′31″W	Robbinsdale	1925 library established entirely through local fundraising led by the Robbinsdale Library Club, symbolizing the self-improvement culture of the early 20th century. Now the Robbinsdale Historical Society Museum.
81	Hennepin Theatre	Hennepin Theatre	January 19, 1996 (#95001548)	910 Hennepin Ave. 44°58′35″N 93°16′39″W	Minneapolis	Leading 1921 example of the ornate vaudeville theatres of the early 20th century, associated with the entertainment district and popular culture of Minneapolis and with major national chain the Orpheum Circuit. Now the Orpheum Theatre.
82	Edwin H. Hewitt House	Edwin H. Hewitt House	April 6, 1978 (#78001539)	126 E. Franklin Ave. 44°57′47″N 93°16′30″W	Minneapolis	1906 Tudor Revival house built for himself by prominent Minnesota architect Edwin Hawley Hewitt. Now a funeral home.
83	Hiawatha Golf Course	Hiawatha Golf Course	April 27, 2023 (#100008905)	4553 Longfellow Ave. 44°55′13″N 93°14′37″W	Minneapolis	Municipal golf course with the city's first clubhouse to be desegregated, in 1952, leading to further civil rights advances by Black golfers in Minnesota, with Hiawatha as a recreational and social nexus.
84	Hinkle-Murphy House	Hinkle-Murphy House	September 20, 1984 (#84001438)	619 10th St. S. 44°58′12″N 93°15′57″W	Minneapolis	Minnesota's oldest surviving Georgian Revival house, built 1886–7; one of the first examples of a wave of Colonial Revival architecture introduced to the state by architects William Channing Whitney and Harry Wild Jones in the late 1880s.
85	Hollywood Theater	Hollywood Theater	February 5, 2014 (#13001145)	2815 Johnson St. NE; 45°01′09″N 93°14′13″W	Minneapolis	1935 Streamline Moderne movie theater designed by prominent theater architects Liebenberg & Kaplan; also emblematic of the growth of locally owned, streetcar-accessible neighborhood cinemas during the Great Depression.
86	Hopkins Commercial Historic District	Hopkins Commercial Historic District	January 21, 2022 (#100007369)	Mainstreet between 8th and 11th Aves. N. 44°55′28″N 93°24′41″W	Hopkins	Two-and-a-half-block downtown district with 32 contributing properties built 1890–1972, originating as a company town and agricultural hub and maintaining its central role during suburbanization.
87	Intercity Bridge	Intercity Bridge	November 6, 1989 (#89001838)	Ford Pkwy. over the Mississippi River; 44°55′04″N 93°12′05″W	Minneapolis	Monumental 1927 reinforced-concrete continuous-rib arch bridge designed by Martin Sigvart Grytbak. Extends into Ramsey County and better known as the Ford Bridge.
88	Interlachen Bridge	Interlachen Bridge	November 6, 1989 (#89001840)	William Berry Dr. over a Minnesota Transportation Museum street railway track in William Berry Park; 44°55′53″N 93°18′32″W	Minneapolis	Minnesota's oldest documented bridge of reinforced concrete, built in 1900; a very early and unaltered example using the Melan reinforcing system.
89	Harry W. Jones House	Harry W. Jones House	June 7, 1976 (#76001060)	5101 Nicollet Ave. 44°54′37″N 93°16′40″W	Minneapolis	1887 house also known as Elmwood, built for himself by major Minneapolis architect Harry Wild Jones (1859–1935) in the style of a Norman chateau.
90	Lake Harriet Methodist Episcopal Church	Lake Harriet Methodist Episcopal Church	May 19, 2014 (#14000217)	4401 Upton Ave. S. 44°55′24″N 93°18′53″W	Minneapolis	Prominent Classical Revival church built in 1916, an unusual manifestation of the City Beautiful movement in an ecclesiastical building.
91	Lake Street Sash and Door Company	Lake Street Sash and Door Company	July 11, 2016 (#16000440)	4001–4041 Hiawatha Ave. 44°55′46″N 93°13′30″W	Minneapolis	Factory complex of one of Minneapolis's leading millwork companies, with three buildings constructed 1926–28 representative of the industry's early-to-mid-20th-century facilities.
92	Lakewood Cemetery Memorial Chapel	Lakewood Cemetery Memorial Chapel	October 20, 1983 (#83003657)	3600 Hennepin Ave. 44°56′10″N 93°17′57″W	Minneapolis	Exemplary Byzantine Revival cemetery chapel built 1908–10, modeled on the Hagia Sophia and containing Minnesota's finest Byzantine-style mosaic interior.
93	Laurel Apartments	Laurel Apartments	May 29, 2020 (#100005245)	15 15th St. N. 44°58′27″N 93°17′04″W	Minneapolis	1893 apartment complex noted for its opulent Queen Anne design by local architect Septimus J. Bowler.
94	Arthur and Edith Lee House	Arthur and Edith Lee House	July 11, 2014 (#14000391)	4600 Columbus Ave. S. 44°55′10″N 93°15′51″W	Minneapolis	1923 house whose 1931–1933 occupancy by an African American family in a traditionally white neighborhood sparked one of Minnesota's largest racially motivated protests, a major incident in the broader saga of housing discrimination in Minneapolis.
95	Harry F. Legg House	Harry F. Legg House	June 3, 1976 (#76001061)	1601 Park Ave. S. 44°58′01″N 93°15′53″W	Minneapolis	1887 Queen Anne home representative of the period's housing developments and middle class residences.
96	Lincoln Bank Building	Lincoln Bank Building	October 15, 2012 (#12000846)	730 Hennepin Ave. 44°58′39″N 93°16′34″W	Minneapolis	1921 commercial building representative of 1920s consolidation in the banking industry, housing one of the city's first branch offices of a national bank.
97	Linden Hills Branch Library	Linden Hills Branch Library	May 26, 2000 (#00000540)	2900 W. 43rd St. 44°55′30″N 93°18′59″W	Minneapolis	1931 branch library associated with the influential evolution of Minneapolis Public Library 1894–1936, and its nationally renowned director Gratia Countryman (1866–1953).
98	Little Sisters of the Poor Home for the Aged	Little Sisters of the Poor Home for the Aged	September 21, 1978 (#78001540)	215 Broadway Ave. NE. 44°59′56″N 93°15′55″W	Minneapolis	Landmark charitable senior housing complex whose 1895 original section is a rare surviving work by Minneapolis architect Frederick Corser.
99	McLeod and Smith Inc. Headquarters	McLeod and Smith Inc. Headquarters	May 24, 2016 (#16000277)	700–708 Central Ave. NE. 44°59′27″N 93°15′04″W	Minneapolis	1897 factory and adjacent 1909 warehouse/showroom (expanded in 1922) built for Minneapolis's earliest and largest furniture manufacturer, progenitor of a significant local industry and the anchor of a large furniture-making district.
100	Lock and Dam No. 2	Lock and Dam No. 2	June 13, 2003 (#03000522)	Mississippi River north of Lake St/Marshall Ave. 44°57′14″N 93°12′28″W	Minneapolis	Remains of the first lock and dam complex on the Upper Mississippi River, in use 1907–1912; better known as the Meeker Island Lock and Dam. Extends into Ramsey County.
101	John Lohmar House	John Lohmar House	April 18, 1977 (#77000742)	1514 Dupont Ave. N. 44°59′41″N 93°17′32″W	Minneapolis	Well preserved example of an upper-middle-class house in late Queen Anne style, built in 1898.
102	Long Meadow Bridge	Long Meadow Bridge	May 28, 2013 (#13000324)	Old Cedar Avenue at Minnesota River; 44°49′48″N 93°14′31″W	Bloomington	Minnesota's longest through truss bridge, constructed in 1920 with five camelback sections to cross a wide backwater lake. Also known as the Old Cedar Avenue Bridge.
103	Lumber Exchange Building	Lumber Exchange Building	May 19, 1983 (#83000903)	425 Hennepin Ave., 10 S. 5th St. 44°58′47″N 93°16′18″W	Minneapolis	One of Minneapolis's last Richardsonian Romanesque business blocks, built 1885–1890. Also noted for its early fire-resistant design by Long and Kees and its association with the city's lumber commerce.
104	Charles J. Martin House	Charles J. Martin House	April 26, 1978 (#78001541)	1300 Mount Curve Ave. 44°58′04″N 93°17′46″W	Minneapolis	1903 Renaissance Revival mansion and grounds, a well-preserved example of an early-20th-century urban estate.
105	Masonic Temple	Masonic Temple	September 5, 1975 (#75000987)	528 Hennepin Ave. 44°58′45″N 93°16′26″W	Minneapolis	1888 Masonic headquarters noted for its Richardsonian Romanesque architecture by Long and Kees and fine stonework. Now the Hennepin Center for the Arts.
106	Maternity Hospital	Maternity Hospital	March 27, 1980 (#80002069)	300 Queen Ave. N. 44°58′49″N 93°18′32″W	Minneapolis	Surviving three buildings (constructed 1909–1916) of a pioneering women's hospital established by social reformer and women's rights advocate Dr. Martha Ripley (1843–1912).
107	Milwaukee Avenue Historic District	Milwaukee Avenue Historic District	May 2, 1974 (#74001021)	Milwaukee Ave. from Franklin Ave. to 24th St. 44°57′39″N 93°14′24″W	Minneapolis	Minneapolis's first planned community for working class families—platted in 1883—with 32 surviving small houses also noted for their architectural consistency.
108	Minneapolis Armory	Minneapolis Armory	September 26, 1985 (#85002491)	500-530 6th St. S. 44°58′31″N 93°15′49″W	Minneapolis	Armory built 1935–36, noted for its exemplary PWA Moderne architecture and innovative use of a reinforced concrete floor system.
109	Minneapolis Brewing Company	Minneapolis Brewing Company	June 21, 1990 (#90000988)	Junction of Marshall St. and 13th Ave. NE. 44°59′59″N 93°16′13″W	Minneapolis	Landmark brewery complex built 1891–1910, significant for its architecture by several notable architects and as a representative of a major industry of the Upper Midwest.
110	Minneapolis City Hall-Hennepin County Courthouse	Minneapolis City Hall-Hennepin County Courthouse	December 4, 1974 (#74001022)	400 S. 4th Ave. 44°58′39″N 93°15′55″W	Minneapolis	Long-serving Richardsonian Romanesque government building constructed 1889–1905, called "one of the most impressive nineteenth century public buildings in the state and the Midwest" in its nomination.
111	Minneapolis Fire Department Repair Shop	Minneapolis Fire Department Repair Shop	May 19, 2005 (#05000447)	24 University Ave. NE. and 222 1st Ave. NE. 44°59′19″N 93°15′26″W	Minneapolis	1909 maintenance shop of the Minneapolis Fire Department with a 1922 addition, associated with centralization of city operations and the department's conversion to motorized vehicles.
112	Minneapolis Pioneers and Soldiers Memorial Cemetery	Minneapolis Pioneers and Soldiers Memorial Cemetery	June 6, 2002 (#02000612)	2925 Cedar Ave. S. 44°56′59″N 93°14′41″W	Minneapolis	Minneapolis's oldest extant cemetery, dating to 1858 and redeveloped 1928–1936, reflecting both the city's pioneer days and an early historic preservation movement.
113	Minneapolis Public Library, North Branch	Minneapolis Public Library, North Branch	December 7, 1977 (#77000743)	1834 Emerson Ave. N. 44°59′55″N 93°17′38″W	Minneapolis	Nation's first library purpose-built with publicly accessible stacks, constructed in 1893; a Near North neighborhood landmark and one of Minneapolis's few intact works by Frederick Corser.
114	Minneapolis Warehouse Historic District	Minneapolis Warehouse Historic District	November 3, 1989 (#89001937)	Roughly bounded by River St., 1st Ave. N., 6th St. N., 2nd Ave. N., 5th St. N., 5th Ave. N., 3rd St. N., and 10th Ave. N. 44°59′08″N 93°16′26″W	Minneapolis	30-block warehouse district representing Minneapolis's rise as a major distribution center in the late-19th/early-20th century, with 142 contributing properties built 1865–1930 by leading local architects.
115	Minneapolis YMCA Central Building	Minneapolis YMCA Central Building	November 29, 1995 (#95001375)	36 S. 9th St. (formerly 30 S. 9th St.); 44°58′33″N 93°16′32″W	Minneapolis	Uncommon example of late Gothic Revival architecture in downtown Minneapolis, built 1917–19.
116	Minnehaha (steamboat)	Minnehaha (steamboat)	October 25, 2021 (#100007073)	140 George St. 44°54′11″N 93°34′29″W	Excelsior	Only operating example of the Twin City Rapid Transit Company passenger boats that served summer residents and tourists around Lake Minnetonka 1906–1926 as an extension of the streetcar system. Scuttled in 1926, raised in 1980, reconstructed and relaunched as a museum ship in 1996.
117	Minnehaha Grange Hall	Minnehaha Grange Hall	October 9, 1970 (#70000914)	4918 Eden Ave. 44°54′39″N 93°20′58″W	Edina	1879 hall of Minnesota's oldest subordinate Grange, organized in 1873. A longstanding social venue and only survivor of Edina's original four buildings. Now managed by the Edina Historical Society alongside Cahill School.
118	Minnehaha Historic District	Minnehaha Historic District	November 25, 1969 (#69000369)	Roughly Hiawatha and Minnehaha Aves. and Godfrey Rd. 44°54′56″N 93°12′39″W	Minneapolis	1889 park surrounding Minnehaha Falls, noted for its urban planning and several historic sites associated with pioneer life, transportation, commerce, and architecture.
119	Minnesota Bridge 2440	Minnesota Bridge 2440	July 25, 2024 (#100010560)	3rd Ave. S./Central Ave. SE. over the Mississippi River; 44°59′00″N 93°15′32″W	Minneapolis	The first open-spandrel, reinforced concrete arch bridge in Minneapolis–Saint Paul, built 1914–1918, providing an integral transportation connection. Better known as the Third Avenue Bridge; also a contributing property to the St. Anthony Falls Historic District.
120	Minnesota Linseed Oil Company	Minnesota Linseed Oil Company	May 28, 2013 (#13000325)	1101 S. 3rd St. and 312 11th Ave. S. 44°58′26″N 93°15′13″W	Minneapolis	1904 facility of Minneapolis's leading producer of linseed oil and its products, a major Minnesota industry in the early 20th century.
121	Minnesota Soldiers' Home Historic District	Minnesota Soldiers' Home Historic District	March 2, 1989 (#89000076)	Roughly bounded by Minnehaha Ave., the Mississippi River, and Godfrey Parkway; 44°54′44″N 93°12′14″W	Minneapolis	State old soldiers' home with 16 contributing properties built 1888–1937, noted for its architecture, influential approach to veteran care, and landscape design by Horace Cleveland.
122	Minnetonka Beach Water Tower	Minnetonka Beach Water Tower	December 16, 2019 (#100004758)	2510 Woodbridge Rd. 44°56′23″N 93°35′01″W	Minnetonka Beach	1928 water tower, linchpin of the municipal water supply system that allowed Minnetonka Beach to grow from an upper-class resort to a community of year-round residents, and a well-preserved example of a once-common early-20th-century design.
123	Minnetonka Town Hall	Minnetonka Town Hall	March 15, 2021 (#86003815)	13231 Minnetonka Dr. 44°56′24″N 93°26′52″W	Minnetonka	Municipal hall built 1906–1907 for what was then Minnetonka Township, representing the push for rural self-determination. Also noted as a rare local example of Neoclassical architecture.
124	Moline, Milburn and Stoddard Company	Moline, Milburn and Stoddard Company	February 20, 1975 (#75000986)	250 3rd Ave. N. 44°59′02″N 93°16′25″W	Minneapolis	A leading Minneapolis example of Chicago School architecture, built in 1886. Also a contributing property to the Minneapolis Warehouse Historic District. Now the Traffic Zone Center for Visual Art.
125	Elisha and Lizzie Morse Jr. House	Elisha and Lizzie Morse Jr. House	July 28, 1995 (#76001057)	2325–2327 Pillsbury Ave. S. 44°57′33″N 93°16′51″W	Minneapolis	1874 Italianate house with wood siding cut and textured to look like stone, one of Minneapolis's few surviving specimens exhibiting this style and aspirational middle-class pretense.
126	Frieda and Henry J. Neils House	Frieda and Henry J. Neils House	May 26, 2004 (#04000531)	2801 Burnham Blvd. 44°57′30″N 93°19′04″W	Minneapolis	1950 house representative of the Usonian style of Frank Lloyd Wright, and the architect's only residential project in marble.
127	New Main-Augsburg Seminary	New Main-Augsburg Seminary	October 6, 1983 (#83003653)	731 21st Ave. S. 44°57′56″N 93°14′31″W	Minneapolis	1901 seminary turned campus center, noted for its integrity and longstanding importance as an educational institution. Now Augsburg University's Old Main.
128	George R. Newell House	George R. Newell House	September 15, 1977 (#77000744)	1818 LaSalle Ave. 44°57′53″N 93°16′48″W	Minneapolis	1888 Richardsonian Romanesque house of a pioneering grocery merchant (1845–1921) whose company grew into major retailer SuperValu.
129	Noerenberg Estate Barn	Noerenberg Estate Barn	August 18, 2015 (#15000527)	2865 N. Shore Dr. 44°57′26″N 93°35′41″W	Orono	Exceptionally intact and well crafted barn built circa 1912, a rare vestige of the working farms established by wealthy estate owners around Lake Minnetonka in the late 19th and early 20th centuries.
130	Nokomis Knoll Residential Historic District	Nokomis Knoll Residential Historic District	August 5, 1999 (#99000938)	Bounded by W. 52nd St., W. Lake Nokomis Pkwy., E. 54th St., and Bloomington Ave. 44°54′26″N 93°15′04″W	Minneapolis	Well-preserved subdivision on the former urban fringe, reflecting the explosion of the middle class, adoption of automobiles, and popularity of period revival architecture in the 1920s and 30s.
131	North East Neighborhood House	North East Neighborhood House	July 19, 2001 (#01000749)	1929 2nd St. NE. 45°00′30″N 93°15′57″W	Minneapolis	1919 settlement house, a notable social institution created to assist the poor and to acculturate and unite immigrants.
132	Northrop Mall Historic District	Northrop Mall Historic District	January 19, 2018 (#100001973)	Roughly bounded by Pillsbury Dr. SE, East River Rd., Union St. SE, and Delaware St. SE. 44°58′28″N 93°14′07″W	Minneapolis	Formal academic campus at the University of Minnesota, the state's largest City Beautiful complex, with 19 contributing properties planned in 1910 and gradually built through 1971.
133	Northrup, King & Company Complex	Northrup, King & Company Complex	January 19, 2021 (#100006005)	1500 Jackson St. NE; 45°00′13″N 93°15′01″W	Minneapolis	Office and factory complex of Northrup-King, the nation's largest seed wholesaler for much of the 20th century, with seven contributing properties built 1916–1947.
134	Northstar Center	Northstar Center	July 11, 2016 (#16000441)	625 Marquette Ave. & 608, 618, & 618½ 2nd Ave. S. 44°58′36″N 93°16′14″W	Minneapolis	Minneapolis's first mixed-use development with office, retail, entertainment, and hotel space; opened in 1963 and expanded in 1966, playing a key role in revitalizing downtown.
135	Northwestern Knitting Company Factory	Northwestern Knitting Company Factory	June 3, 1983 (#83000904)	718 Glenwood Ave. 44°58′49″N 93°17′20″W	Minneapolis	Factory complex built 1904–1915 for leading national underwear brand Munsingwear. Also noted for the first frameless reinforced concrete building in Minneapolis. Now International Market Square.
136	Northwestern National Life Insurance Company Home Office	Northwestern National Life Insurance Company Home Office	July 16, 2012 (#12000414)	430 Oak Grove St. 44°58′05″N 93°17′08″W	Minneapolis	Headquarters built in 1924 for Minnesota's largest life insurance company, dating to 1885. Also significant for its Beaux-Arts architecture. Now 430 Oak Grove apartments.
137	Ogden Apartment Hotel	Ogden Apartment Hotel	January 13, 1992 (#91001956)	66-68 S. 12th St. 44°58′22″N 93°16′39″W	Minneapolis	1910 example of the once-common apartment hotel, a middle-class urban housing option of the early 20th century offering furnished and unfurnished rooms and meals from a central kitchen. Now The Continental group residential housing.
138	Floyd B. Olson House	Floyd B. Olson House	December 31, 1974 (#74001023)	1914 W. 49th St. 44°54′52″N 93°18′15″W	Minneapolis	1922 house of progressive leader Floyd B. Olson (1891–1936), three-term governor of Minnesota during the Great Depression and an organizer of the Minnesota Farmer–Labor Party.
139	Hendrik and Marrigje (Marri) Oskam House	Hendrik and Marrigje (Marri) Oskam House	January 29, 2025 (#100011339)	6901 Dakota Tr. 44°52′42″N 93°23′21″W	Edina	1964 modernist house on a challenging lakeside site; a master work of pioneering female architect Elizabeth Close.
140	Osseo Water Tower	Osseo Water Tower	June 5, 2017 (#100001023)	25 4th St. 45°07′14″N 93°24′10″W	Osseo	1915 water tower associated with Osseo's community planning and development, and one of a dwindling number of examples of a style commonplace between 1890 and 1940.
141	Dr. Oscar Owre House	Dr. Oscar Owre House	March 8, 1984 (#84001446)	2625 Newton Ave. S. 44°57′28″N 93°18′22″W	Minneapolis	1912 house noted for its Prairie School design by Purcell, Feick, & Elmslie and association with a noted professor from the University of Minnesota School of Dentistry.
142	Charles and Grace Parker House	Charles and Grace Parker House	June 11, 1992 (#92000699)	4829 Colfax Ave. S. 44°54′54″N 93°17′30″W	Minneapolis	Exemplary 1913 Prairie School house designed by Purcell, Feick, & Elmslie.
143	Peavey–Haglin Experimental Concrete Grain Elevator	Peavey–Haglin Experimental Concrete Grain Elevator	December 19, 1978 (#78001547)	Junction of Minnesota Highways 7 and 100; 44°56′33″N 93°20′43″W	St. Louis Park	World's first known example of a cylindrical reinforced-concrete grain elevator, built 1899–1900 as a prototype of a structure which came to be widely used across North America's grain producing regions.
144	Peavey Plaza	Peavey Plaza	January 14, 2013 (#12001173)	1101 Nicollet Mall; 44°58′21″N 93°16′32″W	Minneapolis	1975 Modernist urban park plaza designed by M. Paul Friedberg and Associates. Also significant as a major component in the 1960s–70s revitalization of downtown Minneapolis.
145	Pence Automobile Company Building	Pence Automobile Company Building	December 27, 2007 (#07001314)	800 Hennepin Ave. 44°58′38″N 93°16′35″W	Minneapolis	1909 car dealership symbolizing the sudden growth of the early automobile industry; also associated with leading local dealer Harry E. Pence (1867–1933).
146	Phi Gamma Delta Fraternity House	Phi Gamma Delta Fraternity House	September 15, 2005 (#05001040)	1129 University Ave. SE. 44°58′52″N 93°14′21″W	Minneapolis	Early modernist chapter house designed by Carl B. Stravs in 1912, and an influence on the architecture and planning of fraternity housing at the University of Minnesota.
147	Pillsbury A Mill	Pillsbury A Mill	November 13, 1966 (#66000402)	301 Main St. SE. 44°59′02″N 93°15′11″W	Minneapolis	Only intact major facility of Minneapolis's milling district, completed in 1881 and for many years the world's largest and most advanced flour mill. Also a contributing property to the St. Anthony Falls Historic District.
148	Plymouth Building	Plymouth Building	February 5, 2014 (#13001146)	12 S. 6th St. 44°58′44″N 93°16′23″W	Minneapolis	1911 commercial building significant as an influential early example of concrete frame construction and other advancements in engineering and building techniques.
149	Gideon H. Pond House	Gideon H. Pond House	July 16, 1970 (#70000296)	401 E. 104th St. 44°48′48″N 93°16′17″W	Bloomington	1856 house/mission school of Gideon Hollister Pond (1810–1878), an early missionary to the Dakota people who produced an alphabet and dictionary for the Dakota language. Now preserved within Pond-Dakota Mission Park.
150	Prospect Park Residential Historic District	Prospect Park Residential Historic District	May 12, 2015 (#15000213)	Roughly bounded by University & Williams Aves. SE., Emerald St. SE., and I-94; 44°57′58″N 93°12′46″W	Minneapolis	Unique suburban-like Minneapolis neighborhood with 692 contributing properties built 1884–1968, noted for its landscape architecture over hilly terrain, diverse housing stock, and cohesive social spirit through such innovations as the city's first community association.
151	Prospect Park Water Tower and Tower Hill Park	Prospect Park Water Tower and Tower Hill Park	November 13, 1997 (#97001426)	55 Malcolm Ave. SE. 44°58′07″N 93°12′46″W	Minneapolis	1906 park and its distinctive 1913 "Witch's Hat" water tower, associated with city planning, urban infrastructure, architectural eclecticism, and the work of architect Frederick William Cappelen. Also contributing properties to the Prospect Park Residential Historic District.
152	William Gray Purcell House	William Gray Purcell House	October 29, 1974 (#74001024)	2328 Lake Pl. 44°57′33″N 93°18′03″W	Minneapolis	1913 house of architect William Gray Purcell; a leading example of the Prairie School residences designed by his firm Purcell & Elmslie. Now the Purcell-Cutts House of the Minneapolis Institute of Arts.
153	Queen Avenue Bridge	Queen Avenue Bridge	November 6, 1989 (#89001847)	Linden Hills Blvd. over Como-Harriet Streetcar Line; 44°55′28″N 93°18′41″W	Minneapolis	Minnesota's third-oldest surviving reinforced concrete arch bridge, built in 1905.
154	Elizabeth C. Quinlan House	Elizabeth C. Quinlan House	July 25, 2012 (#12000428)	1711 Emerson Ave. S. 44°58′01″N 93°17′39″W	Minneapolis	1925 Renaissance Revival house representative of 1920s eclecticism in architecture and the high-end residences designed by Frederick L. Ackerman.
155	Rand Tower	Rand Tower	April 14, 1994 (#84003937)	527-529 Marquette Ave. 44°58′39″N 93°16′11″W	Minneapolis	1929 skyscraper noted for its stepped Art Moderne design by Holabird & Root.
156	Roosevelt Branch Library	Roosevelt Branch Library	May 26, 2000 (#00000543)	4026 28th Ave. S. 44°55′47″N 93°13′57″W	Minneapolis	1927 branch library associated with the influential evolution of Minneapolis Public Library 1894–1936, and its nationally renowned director Gratia Countryman (1866–1953).
157	St. Olafs Norwegian Lutheran Church	St. Olafs Norwegian Lutheran Church	June 2, 2022 (#100007534)	2901 Emerson Ave. N. 45°00′35″N 93°17′41″W	Minneapolis	1911 church playing a key role in the Norwegian-American heritage and social history of Near North, Minneapolis.
158	Schmid Farmhouse Ruin	Schmid Farmhouse Ruin	December 1, 2015 (#15000849)	.38 mi. NE. of jct. of Cty Rd. 44 and Minnesota State Highway 7; 44°53′49″N 93°40′14″W	Minnetrista	Ruins of an 1876 farmhouse providing a window on the life and construction techniques of a latter-19th-century German immigrant community on Lake Minnetonka. Preserved within Lake Minnetonka Regional Park.
159	Sears, Roebuck and Company Mail-Order Warehouse and Retail Store	Sears, Roebuck and Company Mail-Order Warehouse and Retail Store	July 29, 2005 (#05000745)	2929 Chicago Ave. S. 44°56′57″N 93°15′39″W	Minneapolis	Warehouse/shop complex dating to 1927, marking the transition of major American retailer Sears from mail-order to brick-and-mortar, and the emergence of motorist-oriented commerce. Now the Midtown Exchange.
160	Anne C. and Frank B. Semple House	Anne C. and Frank B. Semple House	February 26, 1998 (#98000151)	100–104 W. Franklin Ave. 44°57′47″N 93°16′47″W	Minneapolis	1901 house and carriage house significant for their Renaissance Revival architecture. Now Semple Mansion event and wedding venue.
161	Sam S. Shubert Theatre	Sam S. Shubert Theatre	October 31, 1995 (#95001230)	516 Hennepin Ave. S. 44°58′46″N 93°16′24″W	Minneapolis	Exemplary 1910 Shubert Brothers theatre designed by William Albert Swasey, important in the development of the early fine theatre scene in Minneapolis. Now the Cowles Center for Dance and the Performing Arts.
162	H. Alden Smith House	H. Alden Smith House	March 16, 1976 (#76001063)	1403 Harmon Pl. 44°58′21″N 93°16′55″W	Minneapolis	1887 house noted for its exemplary Richardsonian Romanesque architecture and design by William Channing Whitney. Now Minneapolis Community and Technical College's Wells Family College Center.
163	Lena O. Smith House	Lena O. Smith House	September 26, 1991 (#91001472)	3905 5th Ave. S. 44°55′56″N 93°16′07″W	Minneapolis	House inhabited by pioneering black female lawyer Lena O. Smith (1885–1966), a prominent figure in local civil rights and activism in the period 1927–1940.
164	St. Anthony Falls Historic District	St. Anthony Falls Historic District	March 11, 1971 (#71000438)	Around the Mississippi River between Plymouth and S. 10th Aves. 44°58′58″N 93°15′31″W	Minneapolis	800-acre (320 ha) district surrounding Saint Anthony Falls, nucleus of Minnesota's largest city: early landmark, source of power to Minneapolis's foundational milling industry, and site of the nation's first hydroelectric plant in 1882.
165	Station 13 Minneapolis Fire Department	Station 13 Minneapolis Fire Department	December 23, 2003 (#03001340)	4201 Cedar Ave. S. 44°55′36″N 93°14′49″W	Minneapolis	1923 American Craftsman fire station built to blend into a residential neighborhood, representing progressive planning for fire protection and urban design during a period of high growth in Minneapolis.
166	Station 28 Minneapolis Fire Department	Station 28 Minneapolis Fire Department	November 12, 1993 (#93001235)	2724 W. 43rd St. 44°55′29″N 93°18′50″W	Minneapolis	1914 fire station representing the extension of city services to Minneapolis' last outlying neighborhood, Linden Hills, and the Minneapolis Fire Department's transition to motorized equipment.
167	Stevens Square Historic District	Stevens Square Historic District	July 1, 1993 (#93000594)	Roughly bounded by E. 17th St., 3rd Ave. S., Franklin Ave., and 1st Ave. S. 44°57′53″N 93°16′29″W	Minneapolis	Minneapolis' most cohesive example of high-density middle-class housing from the early 20th century, with 54 apartment buildings constructed 1912–1926 around a 1908 park.
168	Stewart Memorial Presbyterian Church	Stewart Memorial Presbyterian Church	November 28, 1978 (#78001543)	116 E. 32nd St. 44°56′43″N 93°16′32″W	Minneapolis	Rare example of a Prairie School church, built in 1909 from designs by William Gray Purcell and George Feick, Jr.
169	Strutwear Knitting Company Building	Strutwear Knitting Company Building	November 17, 2015 (#15000791)	1010 S. 7th St. 44°58′17″N 93°15′26″W	Minneapolis	1920s garment factory significant as the site of a successful eight-month strike in 1935–36, a major turning point for the labor movement in Minneapolis history.
170	Studio 80	Studio 80	August 3, 2020 (#100005399)	2709 E. 25th St. 44°57′26″N 93°13′58″W	Minneapolis	Top-of-the-line recording studio in use 1971–1981, attracting internationally famous artists while popularizing the music of Minnesota, and where Prince (1958–2016) recorded early work that largely established the Minneapolis sound.
171	Sumner Branch Library	Sumner Branch Library	May 26, 2000 (#00000539)	611 Emerson Ave. N. 44°59′05″N 93°17′41″W	Minneapolis	1915 Carnegie library associated with the influential evolution of Minneapolis Public Library 1894–1936, and its nationally renowned director Gratia Countryman (1866–1953).
172	Swinford Townhouses and Apartments	Swinford Townhouses and Apartments	October 25, 1990 (#90001552)	1213–1221 and 1225 Hawthorne Ave. 44°58′30″N 93°16′54″W	Minneapolis	Complex of 1886 townhouses and 1897 apartments noted for their Renaissance Revival architecture; some of the earliest compact luxury housing in Minneapolis.
173	Tifereth B'nai Jacob Synagogue–First Church of God in Christ	Tifereth B'nai Jacob Synagogue–First Church of God in Christ	November 5, 2024 (#100011012)	810 Elwood Ave. N. 44°59′12″N 93°18′05″W	Minneapolis	1926 synagogue with rare surviving wall paintings, acquired by Minnesota's first Church of God in Christ congregation in 1957, reflecting the marginalizing factors that channeled first American Jews and then African Americans to Near North.
174	Thirty-sixth Street Branch Library	Thirty-sixth Street Branch Library	May 26, 2000 (#00000541)	347 E. 36th St. 44°56′15″N 93°16′14″W	Minneapolis	1916 Carnegie library associated with the influential evolution of Minneapolis Public Library 1894–1936, and its nationally renowned director Gratia Countryman (1866–1953). Now the Hosmer Library.
175	Thompson Flats	Thompson Flats	May 10, 2019 (#100003916)	1605–1607 Hennepin Ave. S. 44°58′20″N 93°17′09″W	Minneapolis	Early example of an apartment building catering to middle-class families seeking to live near downtown Minneapolis; constructed in 1899 with ground-floor retail space.
176	Thompson Summer House	Thompson Summer House	January 15, 1998 (#97001652)	3012 Shoreline Dr. 44°56′20″N 93°36′00″W	Minnetonka Beach	Rare intact summer house from 1887, also symbolizing the development of Lake Minnetonka as an upper-middle-class resort and the underlying economic boom of 1880s Minneapolis.
177	Swan Turnblad House	Swan Turnblad House	August 26, 1971 (#71000436)	2600 Park Ave. 44°57′19″N 93°15′57″W	Minneapolis	Châteauesque mansion of Swedish American cultural promoter Swan Turnblad (1860–1933), built 1903–1910 and converted into the American Swedish Institute in 1929.
178	Twin City Rapid Transit Company Steam Power Plant	Twin City Rapid Transit Company Steam Power Plant	November 25, 1994 (#94001385)	600 Main St. SE; 44°58′51″N 93°14′57″W	Minneapolis	1903 power plant for the Twin City Rapid Transit streetcar system, the metro's main public transportation into the 1950s.
179	United States Post Office	United States Post Office	April 1, 2010 (#10000130)	212 3rd Ave. S. 44°58′51″N 93°15′51″W	Minneapolis	Post office built 1912–1915, noted for its exemplary Neoclassical architecture. Now best known as the Old Federal Building.
180	University of Minnesota Old Campus Historic District	University of Minnesota Old Campus Historic District	August 23, 1984 (#84001463)	Roughly bounded by University Ave., East River Rd., the Dinkytown Greenway, Arlington St., Pleasant St. SE, Pillsbury Dr. SE, and Church St. SE. 44°58′40″N 93°14′10″W	Minneapolis	13 campus buildings constructed 1886–1907, significant for their association with the University of Minnesota's first period of expansion and their designs by several notable Minnesota architects.
181	Horatio P. Van Cleve House	Horatio P. Van Cleve House	March 16, 1976 (#76001064)	603 5th St. SE; 44°59′10″N 93°14′45″W	Minneapolis	Greek Revival house occupied 1862–1920s by Civil War general Horatio P. Van Cleve (1809–1891)—commander of the 2nd Minnesota Volunteer Infantry—and his wife Charlotte (1819–1907), a writer and humanitarian activist.
182	George W. and Nancy B. Van Dusen House	George W. and Nancy B. Van Dusen House	May 18, 1995 (#95000607)	1900 LaSalle Ave. 44°57′50″N 93°16′47″W	Minneapolis	Elaborate 1893 mansion designed by notable Minneapolis architect Edgar Joralemon in an eclectic Richardsonian Romanesque/Renaissance Revival mix to symbolize the prosperity of a local business leader.
183	Walker Branch Library	Walker Branch Library	May 26, 2000 (#00000544)	2901 Hennepin Ave. S. 44°56′59″N 93°17′53″W	Minneapolis	1911 library branch associated with the influential evolution of Minneapolis Public Library 1894–1936, and its nationally renowned director Gratia Countryman (1866–1953).
184	Washburn A Mill Complex	Washburn A Mill Complex	May 4, 1983 (#83004388)	1st St. S. at Portland Ave. 44°58′44″N 93°15′25″W	Minneapolis	Seven-building complex dating to 1879, associated with major innovations in the flour milling industry and the growth of General Mills. Also contributing properties to the St. Anthony Falls Historic District. Main building is now the Mill City Museum.
185	Washburn Park Water Tower	Washburn Park Water Tower	October 6, 1983 (#83003663)	401 Prospect Ave. 44°54′39″N 93°17′04″W	Minneapolis	1932 water tower significant as a collaboration among architect Harry Wild Jones, engineer William S. Hewitt, and sculptor John K. Daniels.
186	Washburn-Fair Oaks Mansion District	Washburn-Fair Oaks Mansion District	February 17, 1978 (#78001544)	1st and 2nd Aves., 22nd St., and Stevens Ave. 44°57′40″N 93°16′31″W	Minneapolis	Seven mansions built 1884–1912, associated with the second generation of prominent Minneapolitans and embodying the fashionable architecture of the period by notable local architects.
187	Wayzata Bay Wreck	Wayzata Bay Wreck	June 20, 2016 (#16000386)	Wayzata Bay; 44°58′06″N 93°30′57″W	Wayzata vicinity	1879 shipwreck, the nation's best preserved remains of a "model barge", a little-documented design pointed at both ends so it could be towed in either direction.
188	Wayzata Section House	Wayzata Section House	May 18, 2021 (#100006584)	738 Lake St. East; 44°58′06″N 93°30′37″W	Wayzata	Example of the distinctive two-story section houses built and maintained by the Great Northern Railway for employee housing, constructed in 1902 and expanded in 1944.
189	Wesley Methodist Episcopal Church	Wesley Methodist Episcopal Church	February 9, 1984 (#84001469)	101 E. Grant St. 44°58′10″N 93°16′34″W	Minneapolis	Leading work by the leading architect of a period of major church construction in Minneapolis, built 1890–91 using Warren H. Hayes' adaptation of the Akron Plan and other innovative features.
190	Westminster Presbyterian Church	Westminster Presbyterian Church	June 26, 1998 (#98000716)	83 12th St. S. 44°58′17″N 93°16′33″W	Minneapolis	Church built 1896–97 for one of Minneapolis' oldest and most influential congregations, significant for providing social and community services since their establishment in 1857.
191	White Castle Building No. 8	White Castle Building No. 8	October 16, 1986 (#86002868)	3252 Lyndale Ave. S. 44°56′35″N 93°17′18″W	Minneapolis	1936 prefabricated White Castle building, a rare surviving example of the earliest fast food stands and their pioneering architectural use of porcelain enameled steel.
192	Malcolm Willey House	Malcolm Willey House	February 23, 1984 (#84001472)	255 Bedford St. SE. 44°57′38″N 93°12′31″W	Minneapolis	Minnesota's most significant Depression-era Frank Lloyd Wright house, built in 1934 in a precursor to his Usonian style. Also a contributing property to the Prospect Park Residential Historic District.
193	Theodore Wirth House–Administration Building	Theodore Wirth House–Administration Building	June 7, 2002 (#02000611)	3954 Bryant Ave. S. 44°55′52″N 93°17′30″W	Minneapolis	1910 house/office and surrounding park associated with Theodore Wirth (1863–1949), nationally renowned landscape architect and influential superintendent of the Minneapolis park system.
194	The Woman's Club of Minneapolis	The Woman's Club of Minneapolis	January 11, 2022 (#100007357)	410 Oak Grove Dr. 44°58′04″N 93°17′05″W	Minneapolis	1928 clubhouse reflecting the woman's club movement in the United States and local women's involvement in the development of Minneapolis. In 2025, the clubhouse closed and the WCOM placed it for sale.
195	Allemarinda and James Wyer House	Allemarinda and James Wyer House	April 18, 1977 (#77000735)	201 Mill St. 44°54′06″N 93°33′45″W	Excelsior	The largest and best preserved of Excelsior's Eastlake style summer homes built around 1880.
196	Zinsmaster Baking Company Building	Zinsmaster Baking Company Building	June 3, 2020 (#100005246)	2900 Park Ave. 44°57′00″N 93°15′57″W	Minneapolis	State-of-the-art 1928 bread factory, epitomizing the rise of industrial bakeries and the era's shift in consumer preferences to mass-produced, store-bought bread.

== Former listings ==
	Name on the Register	Image	Date listed	Date removed	Location	City or town	Description
1	Isaac Atwater House		December 2, 1970 (#70000913)	1972	1607 S. 5th St.(original address); Current coordinates are 44°48′12″N 93°29′34″W	Minneapolis	Moved to The Landing heritage park in Shakopee, Minnesota, in 1972.
2	Aaron Carlson Corporation Factory	Aaron Carlson Corporation Factory	October 7, 2020 (#100005672)	February 6, 2026	1505 Central Ave. NE; 45°00′11″N 93°14′45″W	Minneapolis	Two-building complex of a local millwork company significant for manufacturing pontoon bridge components during World War II, becoming the only Minneapolis lumber factory to win the Army-Navy "E" Award.
3	Dania Hall	Dania Hall	December 27, 1974 (#74001020)	August 2, 2000	Corner of 5th St. and Cedar Ave.	Minneapolis	Burned down February 28, 2000.
4	Excelsior Fruit Growers Association Building	Excelsior Fruit Growers Association Building	January 4, 1982 (#82002959)	July 1, 2002	450 3rd St.	Excelsior	1910 hall of an agricultural organization. Demolished in 2001.
5	Forum Cafeteria	Forum Cafeteria	March 16, 1976 (#76001059)	May 4, 1987	36–38 S. 7th St.	Minneapolis	1929 Moderne restaurant. Demolished in 1979 for new development, but interior preserved and reassembled at 40 S. 7th St.
6	New Century Mill	New Century Mill	October 10, 1980 (#80002070)	April 29, 1993	Oak and 5th Sts.	Minneapolis	Originally listed in 1980 and expanded in 1987 (Ref #87002302). Burned down in 1990.
7	Nicollet Hotel	Nicollet Hotel	November 16, 1987 (#87002008)	March 15, 1993	235 Hennepin Ave.	Minneapolis	1924 hotel. Demolished in 1991.
8	Philander Prescott House	Philander Prescott House	May 21, 1975 (#75000988)	June 25, 1986	4458–4460 Snelling Ave. S	Minneapolis	1852 house of early pioneer and interpreter Philander Prescott (1801–1862). Demolished in 1980.

== See also ==
- List of National Historic Landmarks in Minnesota
- National Register of Historic Places listings in Minnesota

== Notes ==
- ^{a}Numbers represent an ordering by significant words. Various colorings, defined here, differentiate National Historic Landmark sites and National Register of Historic Places Districts from other NRHP buildings, structures, sites or objects.
- ^{b}Names listed on the National Register may differ from the current or most common names of the structures. For example, the Washburn "A" Mill is now known as the Mill City Museum.
