= John G. and Minnie Gluek House and Carriage House =

Historic house in Minnesota, United States

- U.S. National Register of Historic Places
- Minneapolis Landmark
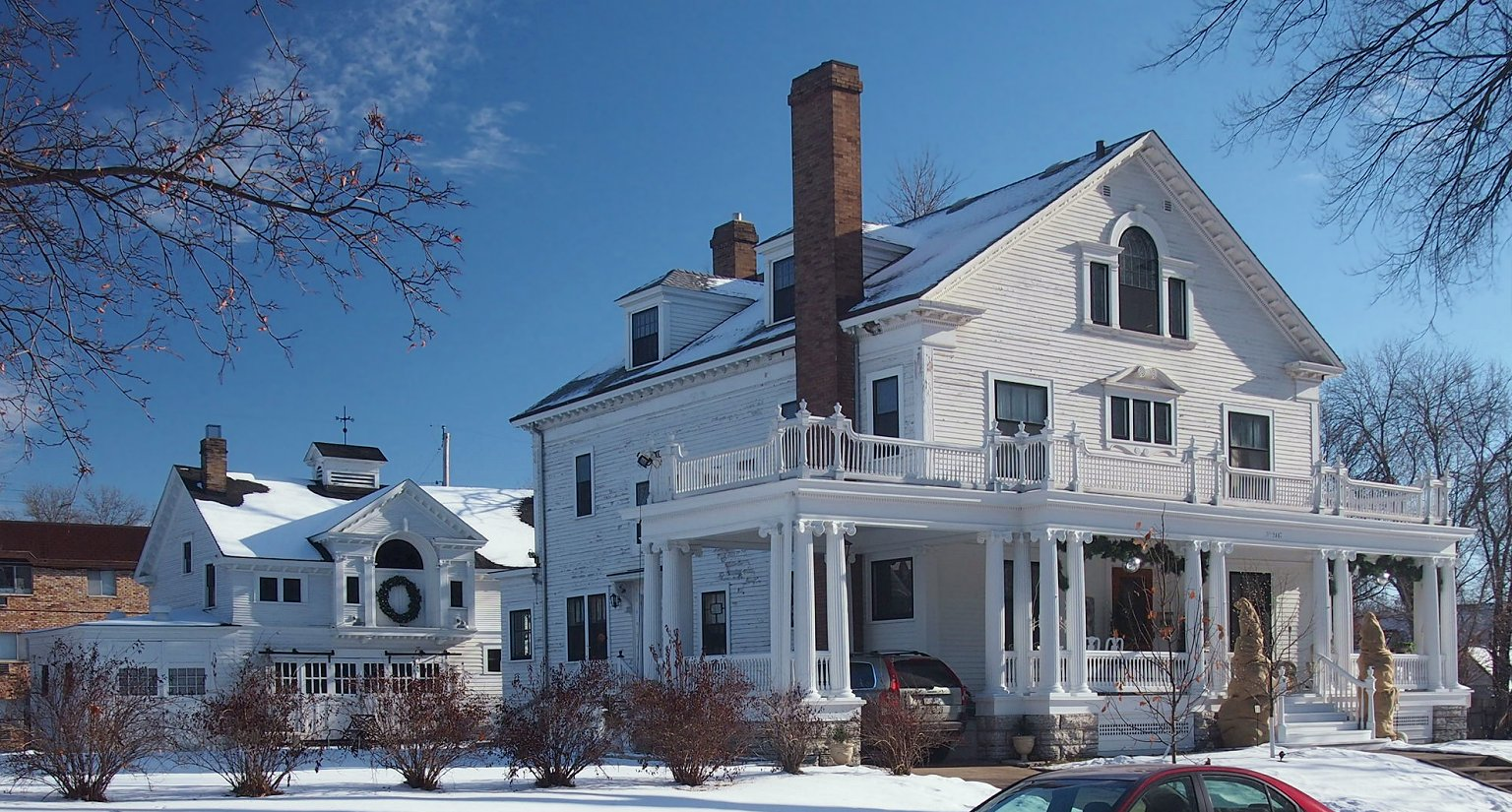
- The Gluek House and carriage house from the northwest

- Location within Minnesota Location within the United States
- Location: 2447 Bryant Avenue South, Minneapolis, Minnesota
- Coordinates: 44°57′27.3″N 93°17′25″W
- Built: 1902
- Architects: William M. Kenyon, et al.
- Architectural style: Colonial Revival
- NRHP reference No.: 90000103

Significant dates
- Added to NRHP: February 9, 1990
- Designated MPLSL: 1987

The Gluek House is a historic Colonial Revival house in Minneapolis, Minnesota, United States. The house was built by John and Minnie Gluek. John was the son of the founder of the Gluek Brewing Company, a regional brewery in the Minneapolis area. The house was listed on the National Register of Historic Places on February 9, 1990.

Architectural historian Paul Larson, who wrote the National Register nomination, cited it as a fine example of Victorian architecture with its Georgian Revival detail and ornamentation. The two-story carriage house in back is even more distinctive, with quarters for horses as well as storage for the hay that fed them. Larson said the carriage house "has to have the fanciest hay storage doors in the Twin Cities." Many of the details inside the house are still intact, including the original icebox.

The house has recently been purchased by new owners, who plan to modernize the house while keeping its historical character.

== See also ==
- National Register of Historic Places listings in Hennepin County, Minnesota
