= Buzza Company Building =

- U.S. National Register of Historic Places
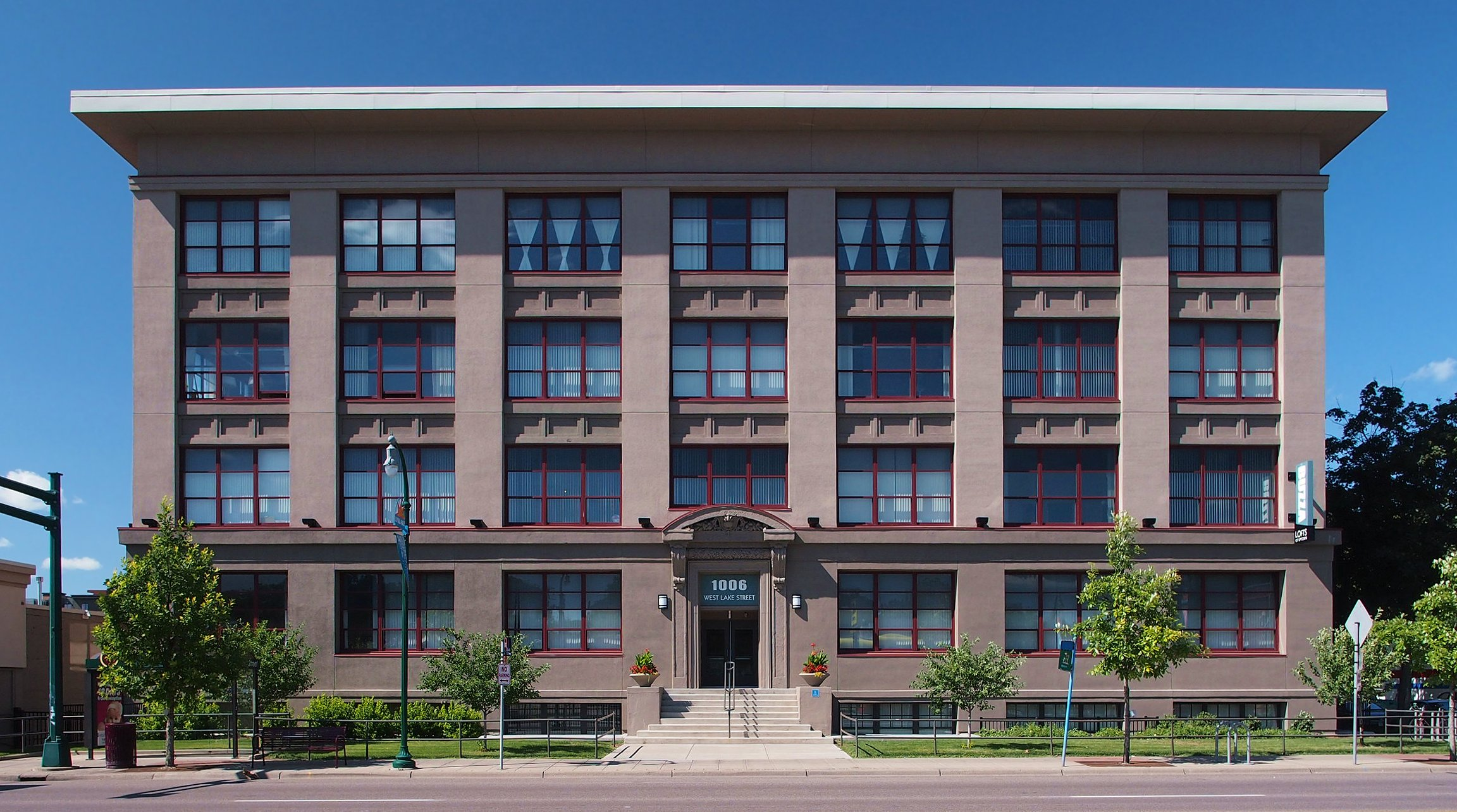
- Original wing of the Buzza Company Building from the south

- Location within Minnesota Location within the United States
- Location: 1006 West Lake Street, Minneapolis, Minnesota
- Coordinates: 44°56′56″N 93°17′32″W
- Area: 2.36 acres (0.96 ha)
- Built: 1907, enlarged 1923-1927
- Architect: James Allen MacLeod; Magney & Tusler
- NRHP reference No.: 11001039
- Added to NRHP: January 24, 2012

The Buzza Company Building in Minneapolis, Minnesota, United States, is a building listed on the National Register of Historic Places in 2012. The building was originally built in 1907 for the Self-Threading Needle Company. It was built by the Brayton Engineering Company at a cost of $55,000. In 1923 the Buzza Company, a maker of greeting cards, acquired the building. George Buzza remarked, "No sooner had we acquired our new building than we promptly outgrew it." The company built a $200,000 addition along Colfax Avenue, designed by local architects Magney & Tusler. They later built another addition, a five-story structure with a tower saying "BUZZA", at a cost of $150,000. The building was used as Buzza's greeting card design studio from 1923 through 1942, at which point declining sales forced the liquidation of the firm. It was then used by Minneapolis-Honeywell Regulator Company for World War II production.

== Gallery ==
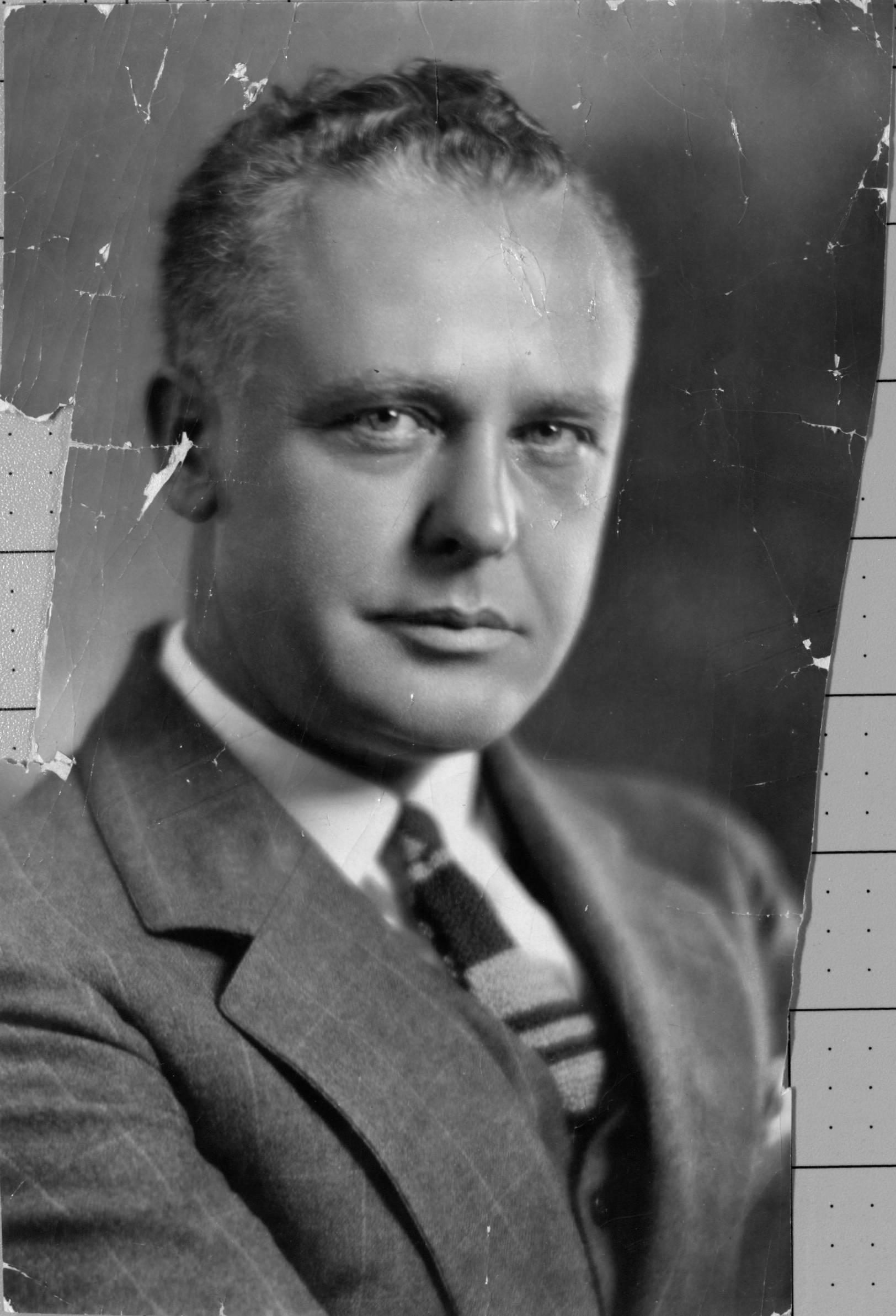
George E. Buzza

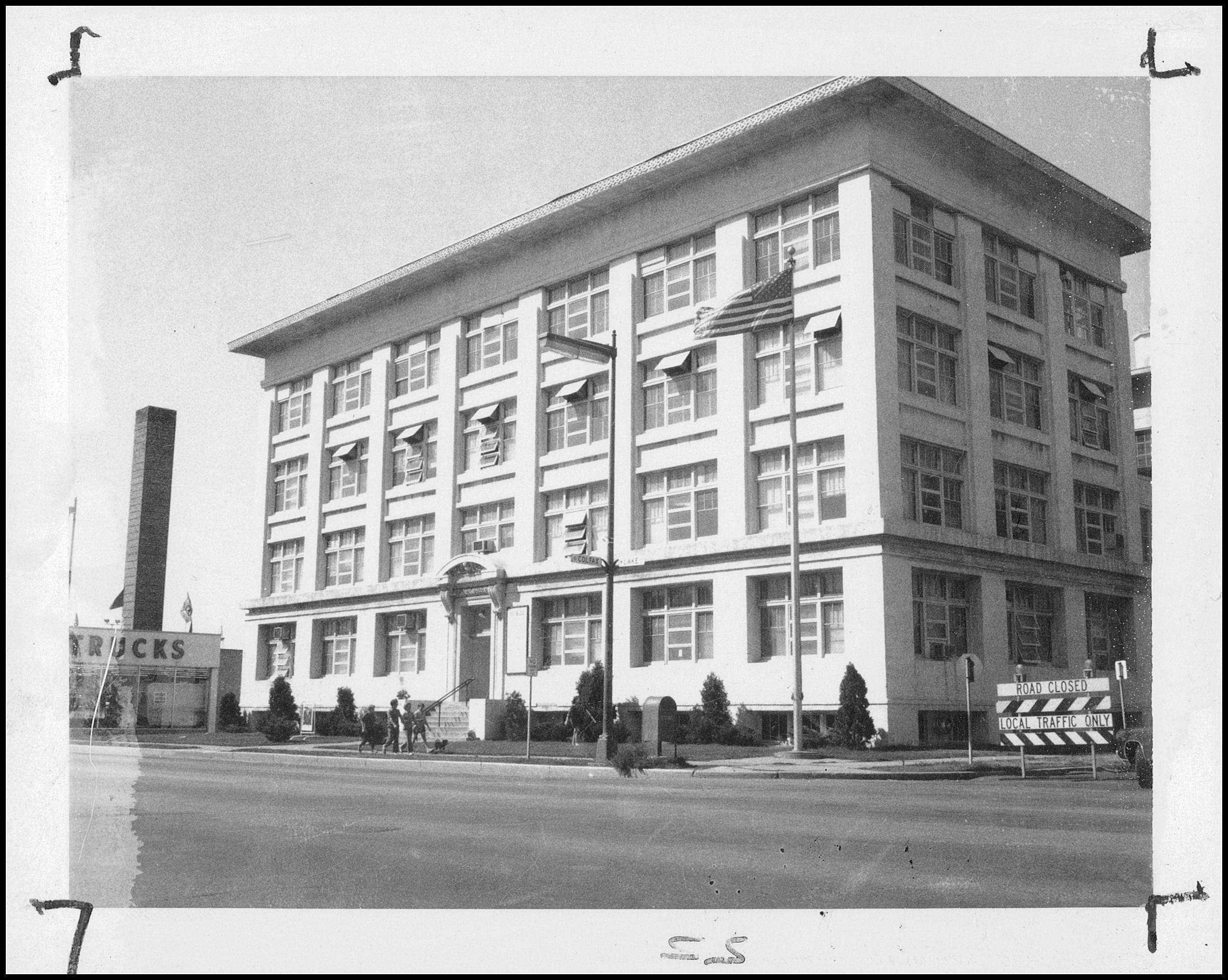
Buzza Company Building, 1971

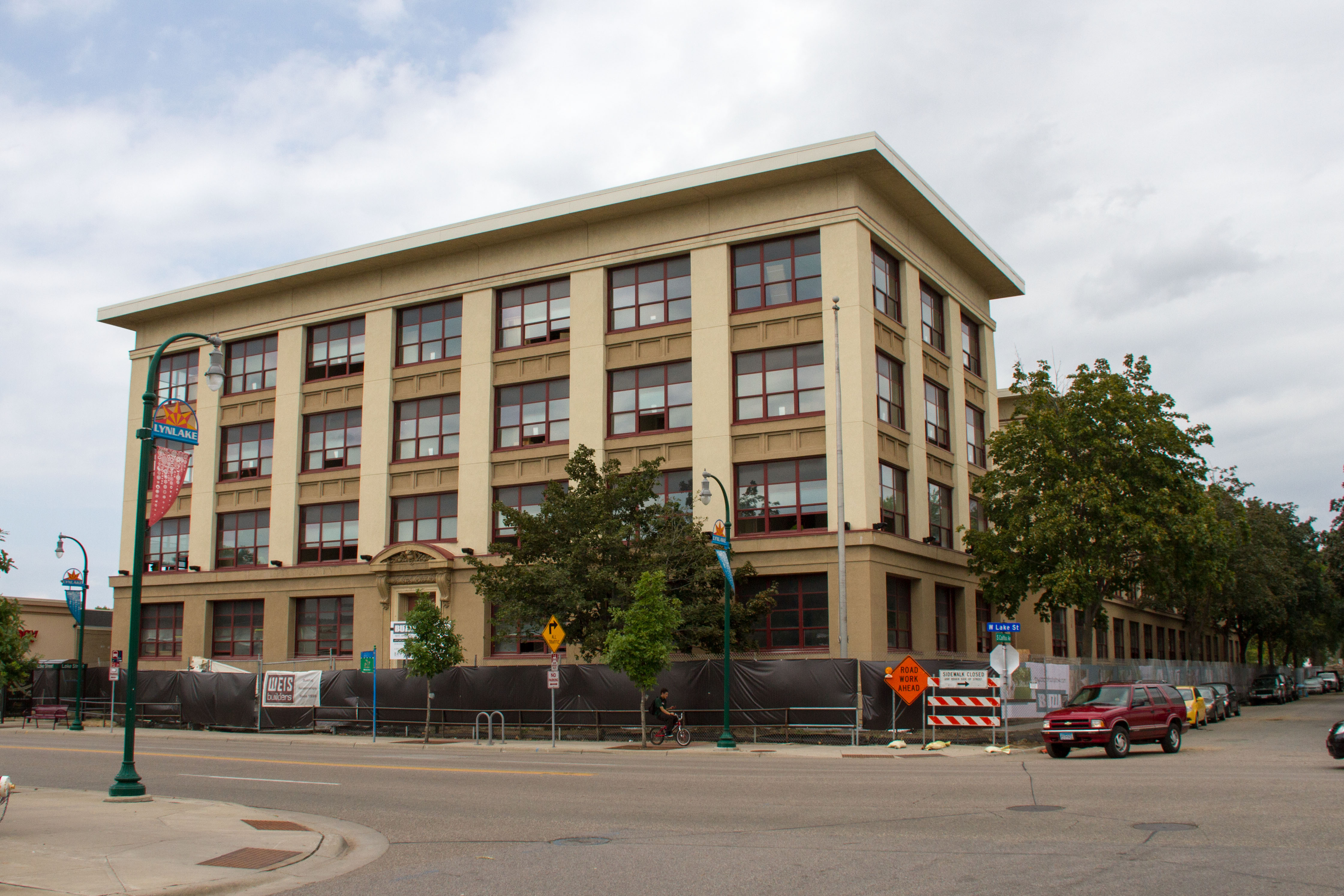
Buzza Company Building, 2012

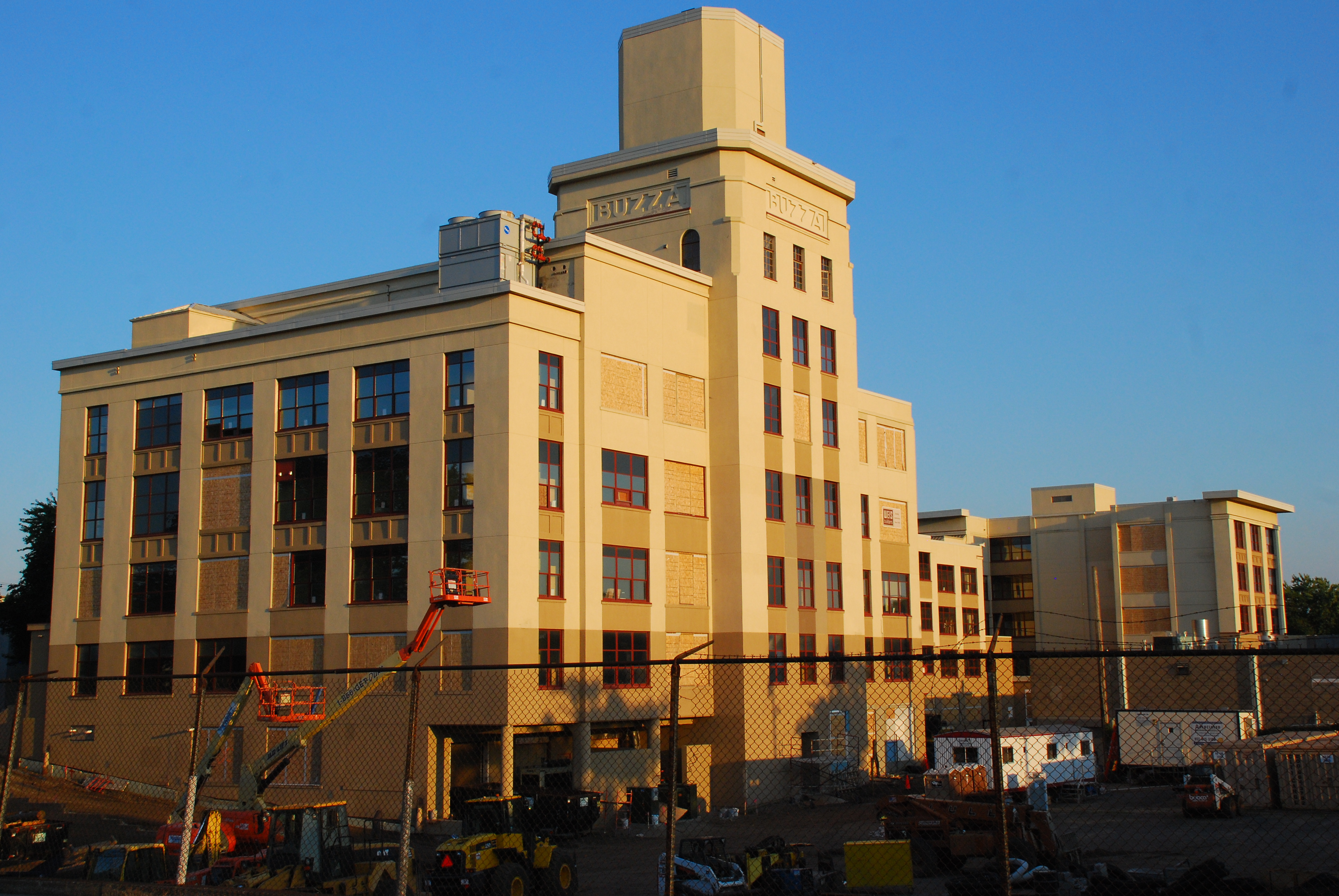
Buzza Company Building, 2012

== See also ==
- National Register of Historic Places listings in Hennepin County, Minnesota
