= Ames–Florida House =

Historic house in Minnesota, United States

- Ames–Florida–Stork House
- U.S. National Register of Historic Places
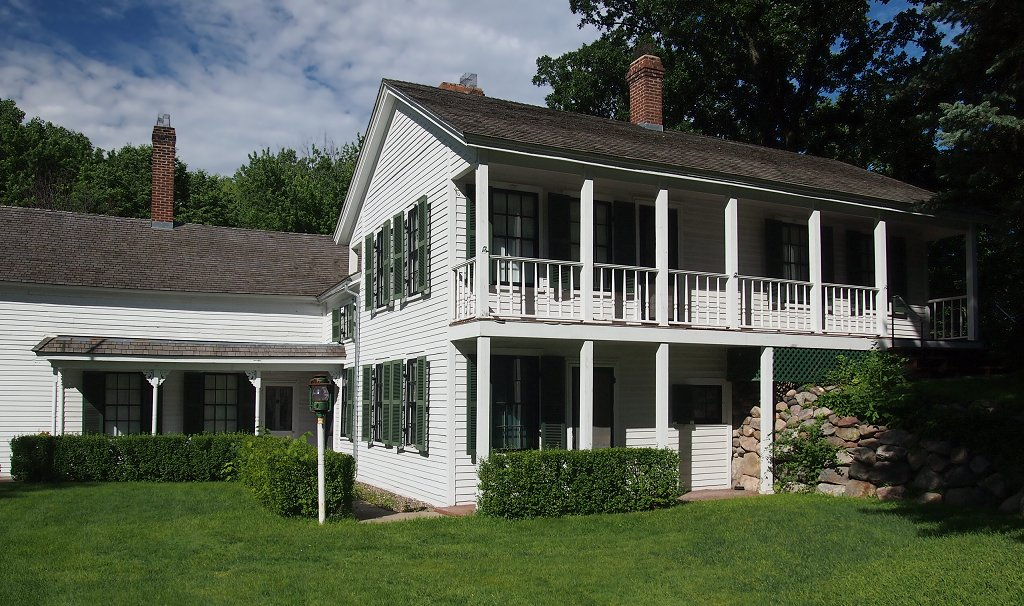
- The Ames-Florida-Stork House from the northeast

- Location within Minnesota Location within the United States
- Location: 8131 Bridge St., Rockford, Minnesota
- Coordinates: 45°5′12.6″N 93°43′54.5″W
- Area: 2.6 acres (1.1 ha)
- Built: 1856
- Architect: George F. Ames
- Architectural style: Greek Revival
- NRHP reference No.: 79003714
- Added to NRHP: October 16, 1979

The Ames–Florida–Stork House is a historic house museum in Rockford, Minnesota, United States, on the Crow River. The house was built in 1856 by New England immigrants George F. Ames and his brother-in-law Joel Florida. Ames and Florida came to Minnesota from northern Illinois by steamship. On the steamship, they met Guilford George, a master carpenter and millwright. The three men formed a partnership and established the community of Rockford clustered around a sawmill and a gristmill.

The house is one of a few houses in Minnesota built with timber framing before balloon framing and dimensional lumber were well known in Minnesota. The hand-crafting extended beyond the exterior construction. The windows and doors were produced on site, as was the interior paneling of fruitwood cut on the property. Several pieces of furniture were also shaped with hand tools. This furniture is on display in the house, which is now open as a museum.

Ames occupied the house until 1878, when he retired due to health problems. He sold the house and his business interests to George Florida, who lived in the house along with two of his three sisters, his mother, and his aunt. They lived in the house until his death in 1936. Mr. and Mrs. Clinton Stork bought the house in 1936. The Storks were interested in history and antiques, and they recognized the historical significance of the house. They resolved to preserve the house and to share it with school children, the community, and others interested in state and local history. The house was donated to the city of Rockford in 1986. The house was listed on the National Register of Historic Places in 1979 as the Ames–Florida House. It was listed for its local significance in architecture, commerce, industry, and settlement for its associations with the founding of Rockford around the Ames–Florida mill.

== See also ==
- National Register of Historic Places listings in Hennepin County, Minnesota
