= Hagel Family Farm =

- U.S. National Register of Historic Places
- U.S. Historic district
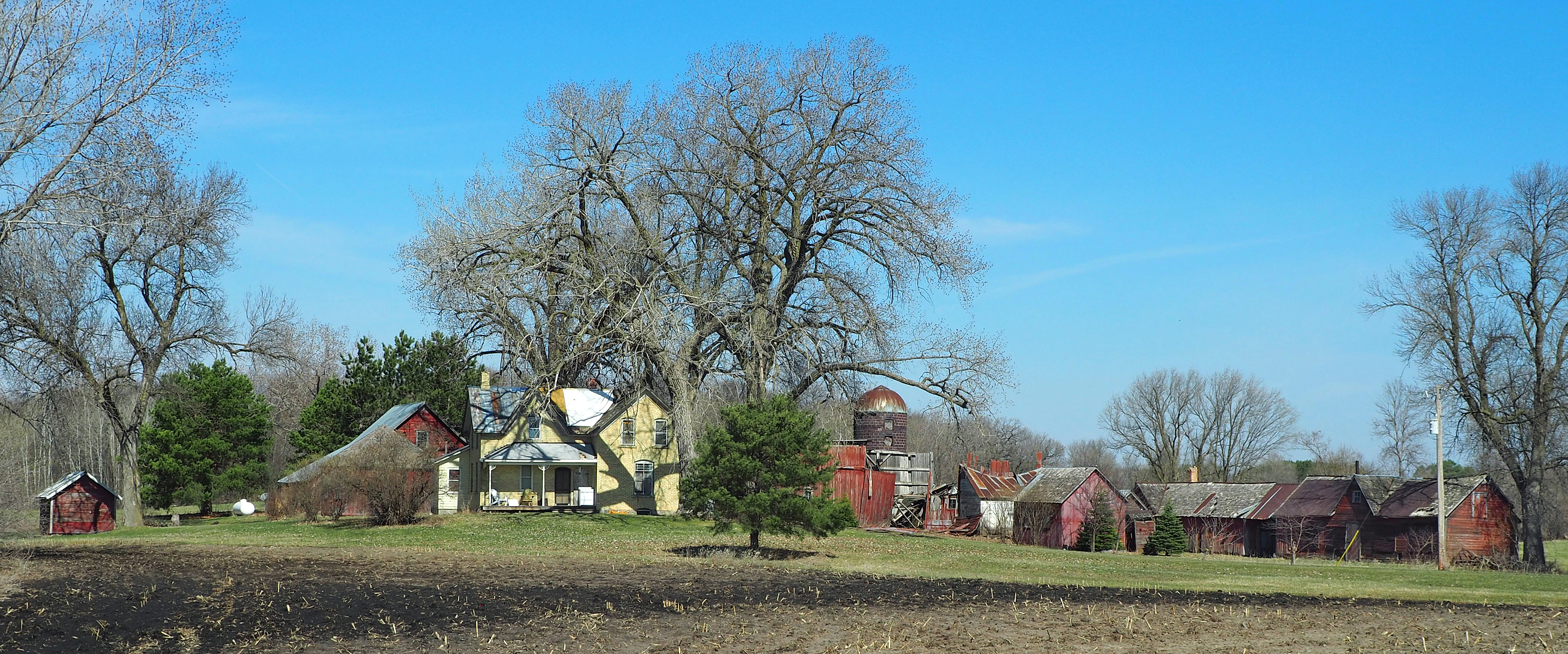
- The Hagel Family Farm viewed from the southeast

- Location within Minnesota Location within the United States
- Location: 11475 Tilton Trail S., Rogers, Minnesota
- Coordinates: 45°9′52″N 93°34′20″W
- Built: 1855
- Architect: Frederick Hagel, et al.
- Architectural style: Diversified farm
- NRHP reference No.: 06001182
- Added to NRHP: December 27, 2006

The Hagel Family Farm is a farm in Rogers, Minnesota (formerly Hassan Township), United States. The farm consists of a 120-acre (49 ha) parcel with several farm buildings, farm fields, woodlands, and wetlands. The farmstead has been in the Hagel family for over 150 years. Its current owner, John Hagel, is a co-founder of the Friends of Minnesota Barns association. John Hagel worked to nominate the farm to the National Register of Historic Places to preserve it as a complete, original farmstead. Susan Roth of Minnesota's State Historic Preservation Office commented, "The Hagel farm has extremely high physical integrity. I'm feeling very confident that the board will look approvingly." The farm was listed on the National Register in December 2006.

All but one of the original buildings remain intact. The buildings include the farmhouse, a timber-framed mortise and tenon barn with an attached milk house, and a two-story saltbox style granary. The bricks for the farmhouse were believed to have been manufactured in nearby Dayton, Minnesota. The farm had no electricity until 1948; before that, they had kerosene lighting. There was also no refrigeration in the early days. Butter and milk were kept in a pit in the yard until they later acquired an icebox.

The farm was originally settled by John Hagel's great-great-grandparents, Peter and Helena Hagel, who immigrated from Germany and settled 160 acres (0.65 km^{2}) on January 20, 1858. Around 1890, Peter and Helena divided the farm among their two sons, Fred and Paul. Fred and Gertrude Hagel, John's great-grandparents, built the 117-year-old farmhouse, and his grandfather Arnold and his father Leroy grew up on the farm. Arnold Hagel died in 1951, and his wife Anna Hagel stayed on the farm until she died in 1987. Anna Hagel rented the fields out to other farmers and sold the animals and farm implements. Without the wear and tear of daily farming operations and the need to modernize farming practices, the farm buildings were virtually unchanged since the 1950s. John Hagel could have sold the farmland for suburban development, but was more interested in preserving the farm as a historic site. The two-story barn appears to have collapsed as of 2026.
