= Plymouth Building =

Building in Minnesota, US

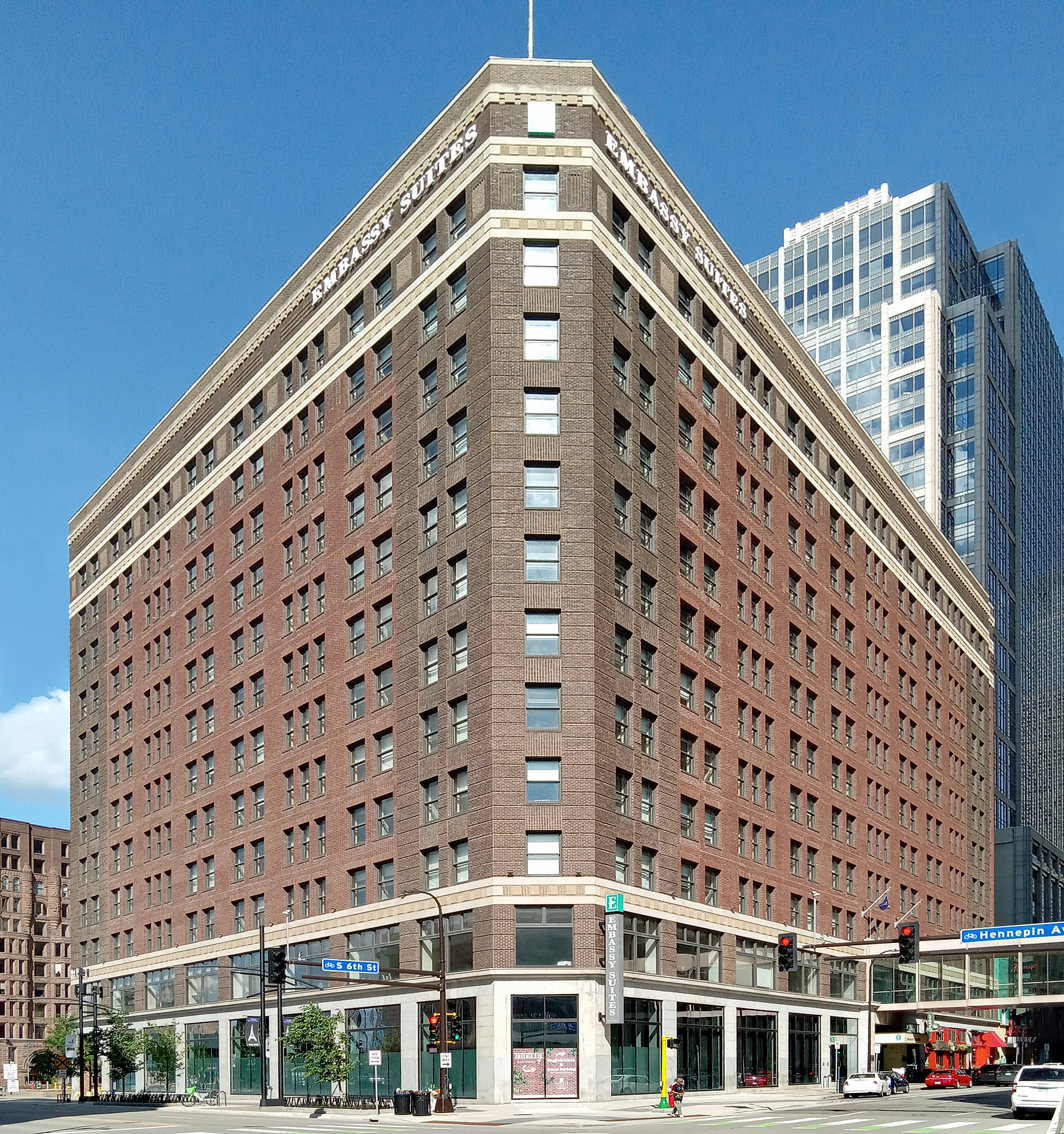
- The Plymouth Building viewed from the west
- Interactive map of the Plymouth Building area

General information
- Status: Completed
- Location: 12 6th Street South, Minneapolis, Minnesota
- Construction started: 1910
- Completed: 1911

Height
- Roof: 170ft

Technical details
- Floor count: 13

Design and construction
- Architects: Larson & McLaren; Long, Lamoreaux & Long

References
- Plymouth Building
- U.S. National Register of Historic Places
- Location within Minnesota Location within the United States
- Coordinates: 44°58′44″N 93°16′23″W
- NRHP reference No.: 13001146
- Added to NRHP: February 5, 2014

The Plymouth Building, now the Embassy Suites by Hilton Minneapolis Downtown, is a 12-story building in Minneapolis. Built 1910–1911, it was touted as the world's largest all reinforced concrete office building at the time it was constructed.

In 1936, the building's exterior was renovated, removing much of the ornamentation and beaux arts styling in favor of a cleaner and more modern appearance. This style of architecture (somewhat typical of government buildings in the 1930s) is sometimes called "starved classicism."

In 2014, the building was added to the National Register of Historic Places on the basis of its unique construction methods. Later that year plans were released to convert the building from office space to a boutique hotel.

On August 25, 2016, the Plymouth Building re-opened as part of Embassy Suites by Hilton. It has 290 guest suites, 9,000 square feet of meeting space, as well as a connection to the Lyon's Pub next door.
