= Lake Street Sash and Door Company =

Former industrial building in south Minneapolis

- U.S. National Register of Historic Places
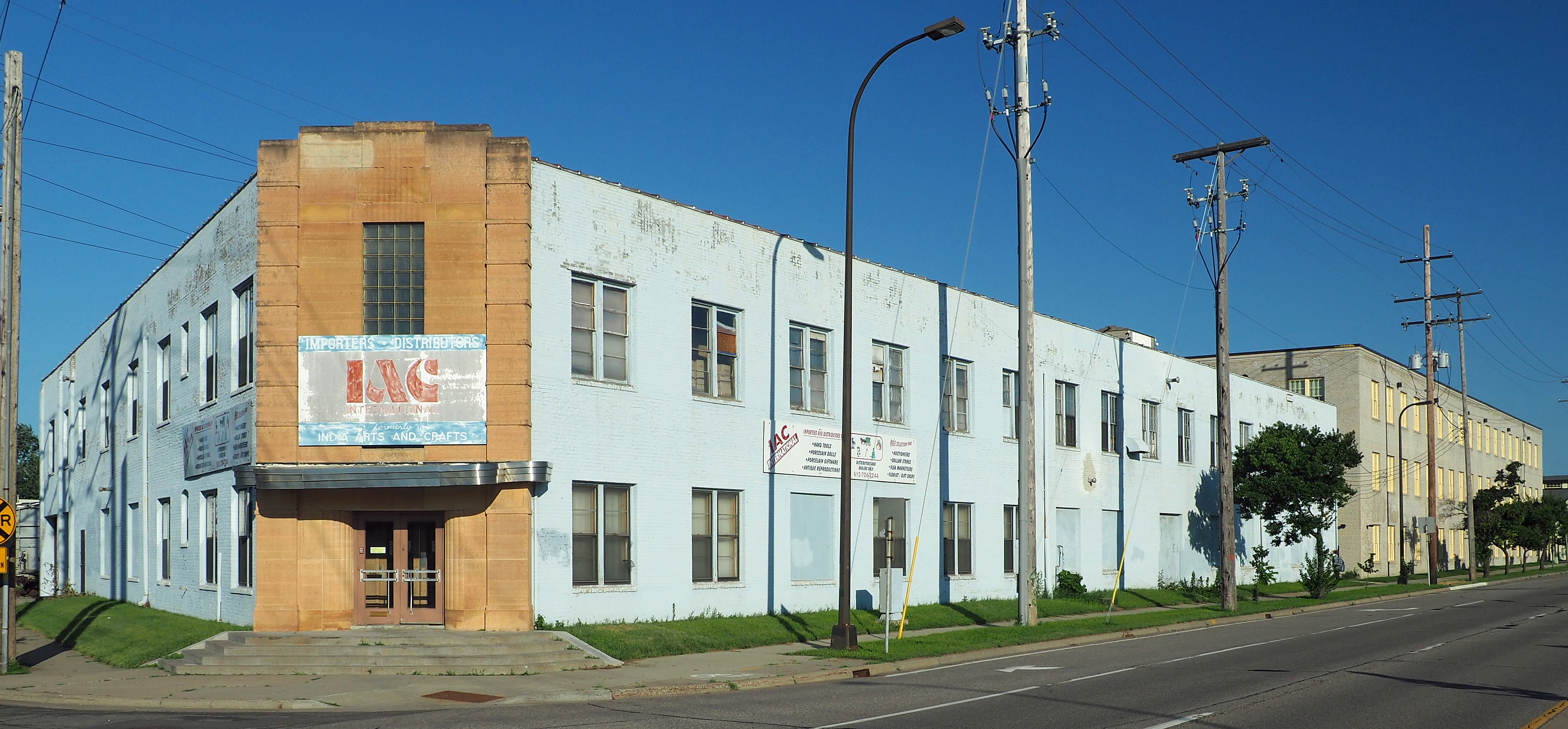
- Lake Street Sash and Door Company in 2018

- Location within Minnesota
- Location: 4001-4041 Hiawatha Ave., Minneapolis, Minnesota
- Coordinates: 44°55′47″N 93°13′29″W
- Area: 2.5 acres (1.0 ha)
- NRHP reference No.: 16000440
- Added to NRHP: July 11, 2016

Lake Street Sash & Door Company is a former factory in Minneapolis, Minnesota. It is a complex of three buildings located between Hiawatha Avenue and railroad tracks built by the Milwaukee Road, spanning the block between 40th Street and 41st Street. The factory was listed on the National Register of Historic Places in 2016 as the only remaining millwork company along the Hiawatha Avenue corridor.

The company was organized in 1916 or 1917, as reported by different articles. Its first building was at 3016 4th Avenue South, but the founder, Helmar Knudsen, wanted to have it on a railroad line. Around 1919, they moved to a building at 3121-47 Hiawatha Avenue, close to the Milwaukee Road's maintenance and repair shops. The company's sales increased, so in late 1922, Knudsen petitioned the Minneapolis City Council to build a factory and to pile lumber on the block bounded by East 40th and 41st Streets, Hiawatha Avenue, and the railroad tracks. By October 1926, the new factory was ready for occupation, with the capacity for a workforce of 100 employees. The existing factory on 3121 Hiawatha Avenue was still in operation, with the capacity for 75 employees. The new factory also had an enclosed lumber shed, which helped to avoid losses and assured proper ventilation. A few months after opening the second factory, the company built a warehouse, which started as a one-story structure but was designed for a later upgrade to a second story. Employment was forecast to be around 140 by the end of 1927. The company continued to use its first factory for a time until 1931, when another millwork factory moved into that space.

Lake Street Sash & Door Company expanded its sales beyond Minneapolis, such as providing doors and millwork to the municipal hospital in Spencer, Iowa and providing millwork for the Reedsville, Wisconsin post office. The peak years for the company were the 1950s, when sales averaged $3 million annually. However, by 1960, sales began to decrease, because fewer regular customers and small contractors were patronizing the business. Helmar Knudsen was 85 by that time and was ready to retire.

In 2016, plans were announced to convert the building complex into the Millworks Lofts, offering moderately-priced housing. The plans included 55 one-bedroom apartments, 22 two-bedroom apartments, and one three-bedroom apartment. Tax credits from the historic designation made the project financially feasible. The loft-style apartments featured the timber posts and beams present in the old factory, along with high ceilings and polished concrete floors. The conversion also included a geothermal heating and cooling system with coils buried under the parking lot. The apartments participate in the Low-Income Housing Tax Credit Program and are considered affordable housing.
