= Nokomis Knoll Residential Historic District =

Historic district in Minnesota, United States

- U.S. National Register of Historic Places
- U.S. Historic district
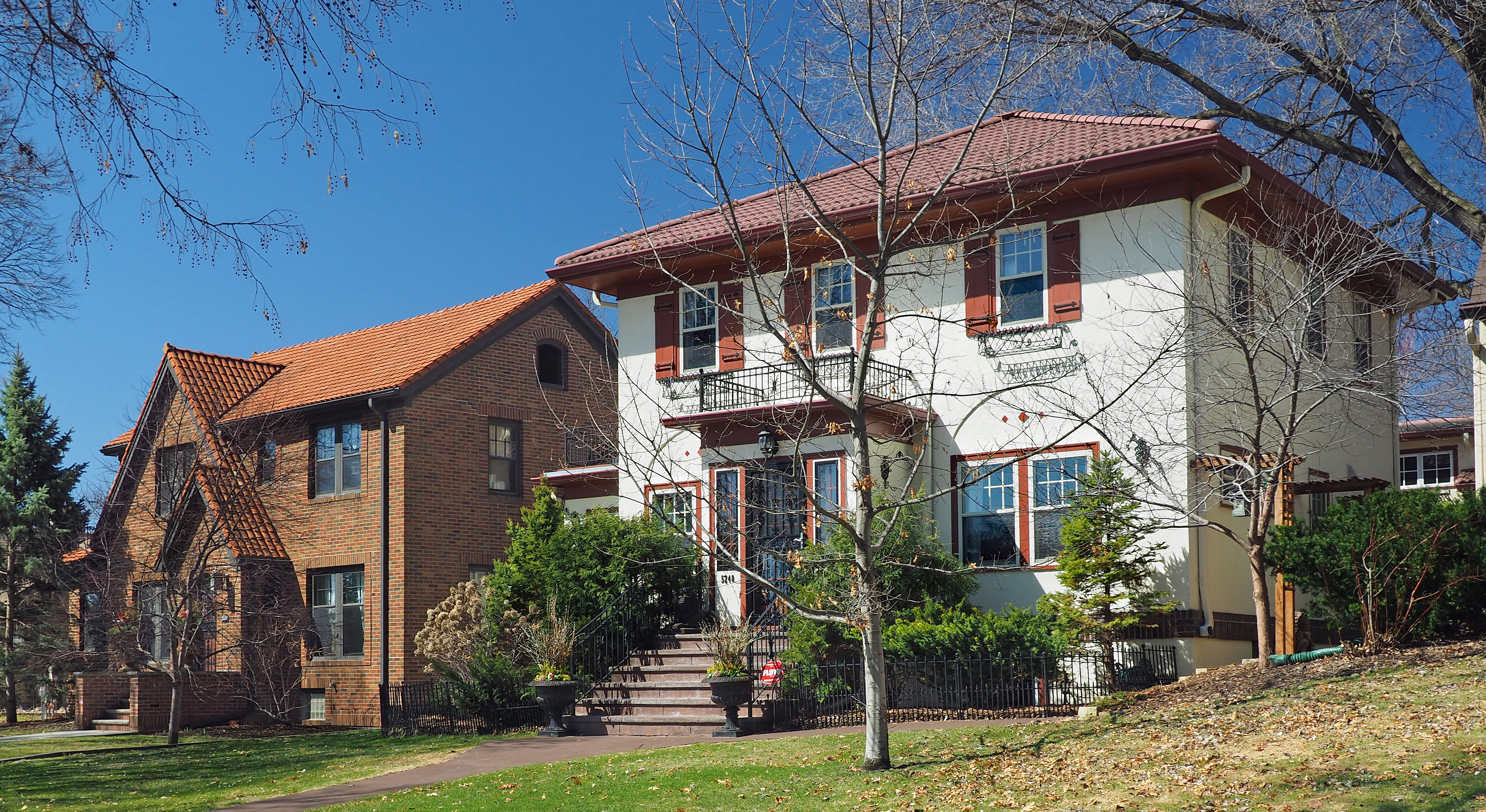
- Two houses within the Nokomis Knoll Residential Historic District

- Location within Minnesota Location within the United States
- Location: Bounded by W. 52nd Street, West Lake Nokomis Parkway, E. 54th Street, and Bloomington Avenue, Minneapolis, Minnesota
- Coordinates: 44°54′26″N 93°15′2″W
- Area: 12.5 acres (5.1 ha)
- Built: 1920s–1930s
- Architect: Carlson, Gerald E.; et al.
- Architectural style: Late 19th And 20th Century Revivals
- NRHP reference No.: 99000938
- Added to NRHP: August 05, 1999

Nokomis Knoll Residential Historic District is a neighborhood of houses near Lake Nokomis in Minneapolis, Minnesota, United States. The district was listed on the National Register of Historic Places in 1999 and features a number of homes built in popular revival architecture styles of the 1920s, 1930s, and early 1940s. The styles include French and Italian Renaissance, Tudor Revival, Spanish Colonial Revival, and Colonial Revival. There are also a few American Craftsman and bungalow style houses. Tudor Revival is the most prominent style in this district. Most of the homes were built during a nationwide housing boom of middle- and upper-middle-class house building. The homes also show the influence of increasing automobile ownership among the middle class, since most of the houses had individual garages built as standard amenities.
