= District No. 99 School =

- U.S. National Register of Historic Places
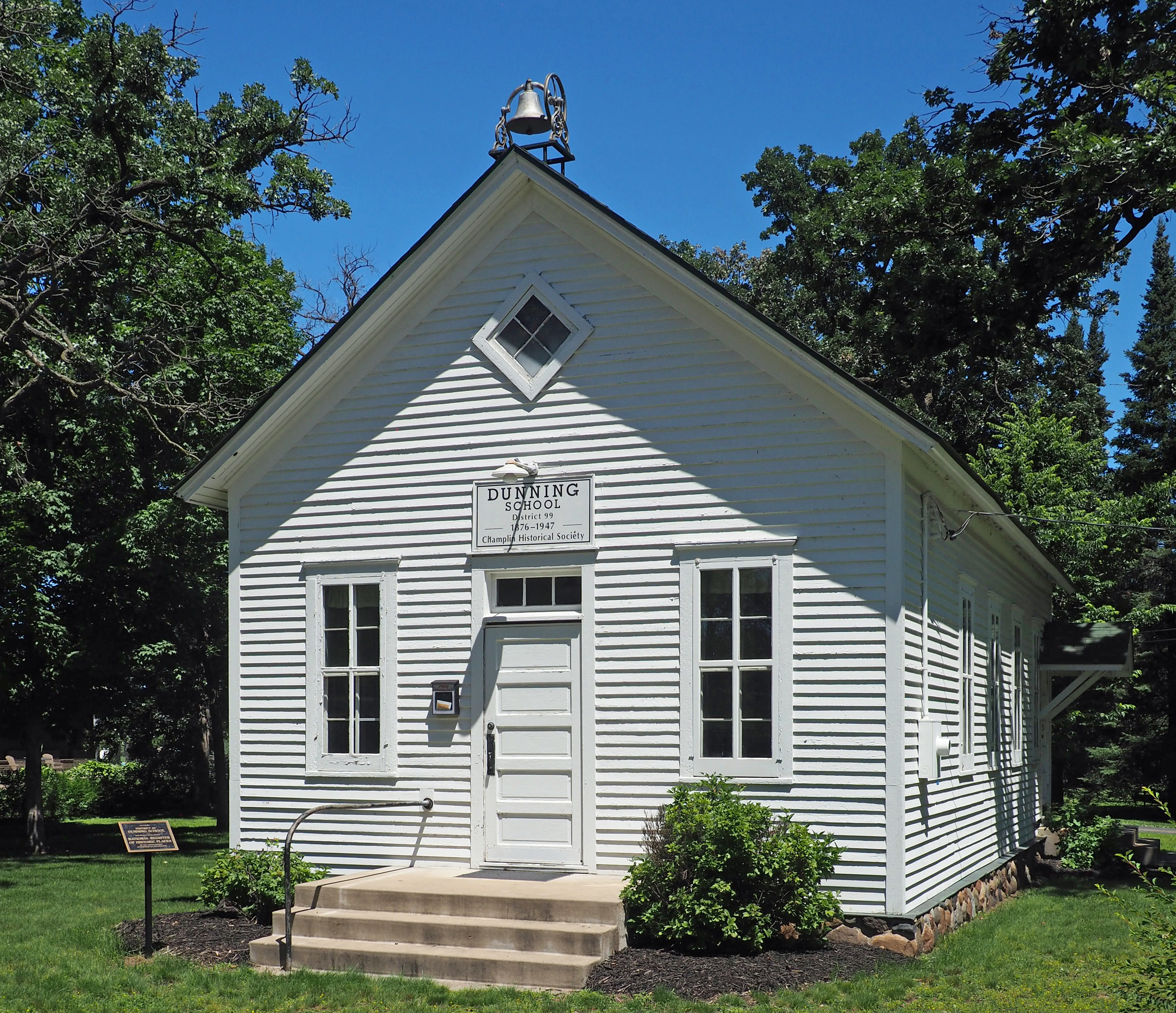

- Location within Minnesota Location within the United States
- Location: 10980 West River Road, Champlin, MN
- Coordinates: 45.15380°N 93.34035°W
- Architect: Unknown
- Architectural style: one-room schoolhouse
- NRHP reference No.: 100009722

District No. 99 School, also known as the Dunning School, is a historic one-room schoolhouse located in Champlin, Minnesota. It was built in 1876 and served as the only place where residents of the rural portions of Champlin Township could receive a formal education. It was used as a school until 1947.

Public schools in Minnesota were mandated by the 1849 Minnesota Territorial School Code and the 1857 state constitution. A township could contain several school districts, each responsible for managing their own schools, hiring teachers, and maintaining buildings. Since transportation in the 1800s was limited, early settlers wanted schools close to their homes, so a group of five or six families could submit a petition to the county to establish a new common school district. The proliferation of neighborhood common schools made public education more accessible and allowed communities autonomy over their own schools. In 1945, there were approximately 5,000 one-room schoolhouses in Minnesota, and most of them had fewer than 20 students. State education officials were concerned with the quality and costs of all these schools, as well as a shortage of qualified teachers. The Minnesota Legislature created an advisory commission on school reorganization in 1947, but reorganization and consolidation were not made mandatory until 1963.

Early schooling in Champlin Township was provided in the more settled areas of the village of Champlin. The first school was opened in a temporary shanty in 1855, and the first purpose-built school came in 1860. This building was demolished in 1887, and a larger, more modern school with four rooms was built. This structure existed until 1938. This school did not meet the needs of the rural portions of the township, though, so two schools and districts were established. One of these was the Dunning School (District No. 99), while the other was the Emery School (District No. 35). The Dunning School was built in 1876 and named for John B. Dunning, who donated the land and served as the district's treasurer from 1877 to 1885. The building was located in the far southeast corner of Champlin Township. The building was a typical one-room school, with a simple gabled roof, a rectangular shape, large windows, and separate entrances for girls and boys. The school offered a winter term and a summer term, but boys usually attended during the winter term because there was a slowdown in farm work. Girls and young children were more commonly in attendance during the summer term. By 1881, the Dunning School was attracting students from neighboring Brooklyn Township (now Brooklyn Park).

By 1947, the school was overcrowded and unable to accommodate students past the sixth grade. District number 99 was dissolved and consolidated with district number 34, which served the Village of Champlin. The Dunning School operated as a town hall until 1971, when the Village of Champlin consolidated with Champlin Township. The school building is now owned by the City of Champlin.
