= Cameron Transfer and Storage Company Building =

- U.S. National Register of Historic Places
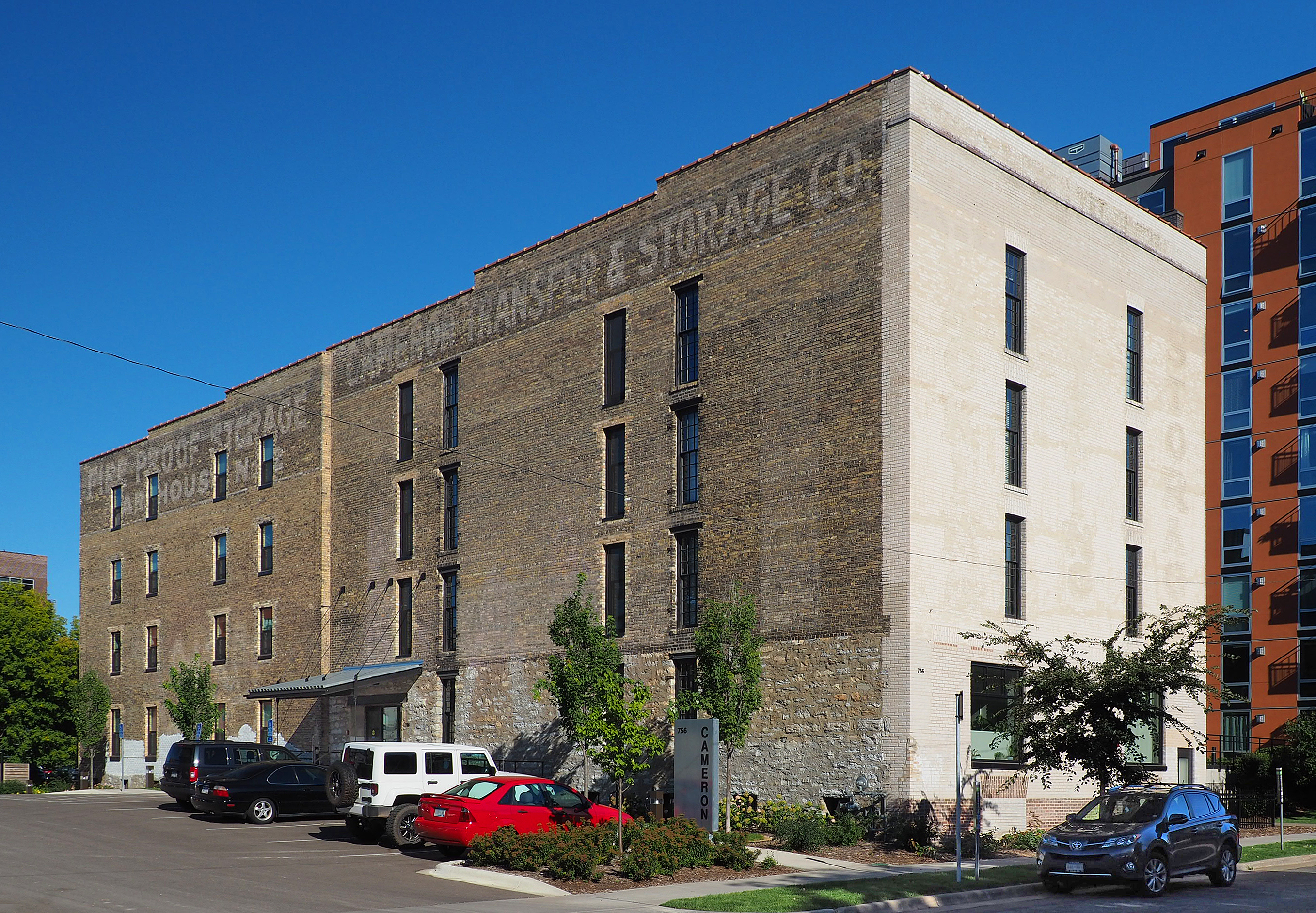

- Location within Minnesota
- Location: 756 N. 4th St., Minneapolis, Minnesota
- Coordinates: 44°59′14″N 93°16′49″W
- Area: 0.7 acres (0.28 ha)
- Architect: C.A.P. Turner
- NRHP reference No.: 14000390
- Added to NRHP: July 14, 2014

Cameron Transfer and Storage Company Building is a four-story warehouse building in the North Loop area of Minneapolis. The building illustrates the different structural systems and shows the evolution from timber post-and-beam framing to the mushroom capital posts used in more contemporary building. It was designed by C.A.P. Turner and built in three phases between 1909 and 1911. The building was listed on the National Register of Historic Places in 2014.

The first section of the building, built in 1909, has a basement with reinforced concrete and mushroom-capital columns. The first through third floors of the 1909 section has a timber post-and-beam structural system where the timbers bear down on the masonry exterior walls. The wooden beams measure 12 inches (300 mm) by 11.5 inches (290 mm) on the first floor, gradually decreasing on upper floors to 10 inches (250 mm) by 8 inches (200 mm) on the fourth floor. The interior bay dimensions between posts are 16 feet (4.9 m) by 14 feet (4.3 m). In 1910, a four-story addition was built on the north side, with a reinforced concrete structure and mushroom-capital columns in the basement and on the first through fourth floors. The concrete columns measure 23 inches (580 mm) in diameter on the first floor, gradually decreasing on upper floors to 15 inches (380 mm) in diameter on the fourth floor. The interior bay dimensions between posts are 17 feet (5.2 m) by 18 feet (5.5 m). In 1911, a fourth story was added to the 1909 section using the same post-and-beam system used on the lower three floors.

C.A.P. Turner got his start with reinforced concrete while employed as a bridge engineer between 1890 and 1901. In 1904, Turner designed the Northwestern Knitting Company Factory with a traditional concrete beam system. The following year, he designed the Minneapolis Paper Company Building (no longer in existence) at 400-404 South Fifth Street. He published the results of load tests in the 1906 edition of Transactions of the American Society of Civil Engineers and used those results to fine-tune his knowledge of reinforced concrete. Although Robert Maillart of Switzerland was credited as the inventor of the mushroom-capital system, C.A.P. Turner was recognized as having independently designed the system in the United States. He was awarded patents for the mushroom-capital system in 1911, and this system increased useable building space and decreased the cost of construction. Without the need for beams on top of posts, overall building height could be decreased even with the same floor heights.

The city of Minneapolis building department was skeptical of mushroom-capital and flat-slab construction, though. In 1906, he designed the Johnson-Bovey Building (no longer in existence) at 426-432 Second Avenue North. The building department refused to grant a permit unless the construction could withstand a test load of 700 pounds (320 kg) per 1 square foot (0.093 m^{2}) with a maximum deflection of 0.625 inches (15.9 mm) at the center of the slab. When tested, the slab showed only 0.25 inches (6.4 mm) of deflection. Later that year, Turner designed the Marshall Building in Milwaukee, which is the oldest existing example of his mushroom system.

In 2015, Schafer Richardson announced a plan to convert the building into 44 units of affordable rental housing, with studio, one-bedroom, and two-bedroom apartments. The building had been slated to be torn down, and Schafer Richardson even had a demolition permit, but that plan was scrapped when it was discovered that the building might be the oldest building in Minneapolis designed by C.A.P. Turner. The building was renovated with a new roof, new windows, and tuckpointing. The affordability targets were for people who earned 50 to 60 percent of the area's median income. The building was fully restored and occupied in August 2016.
