= Minneapolis Fire Department Repair Shop =

- U.S. National Register of Historic Places
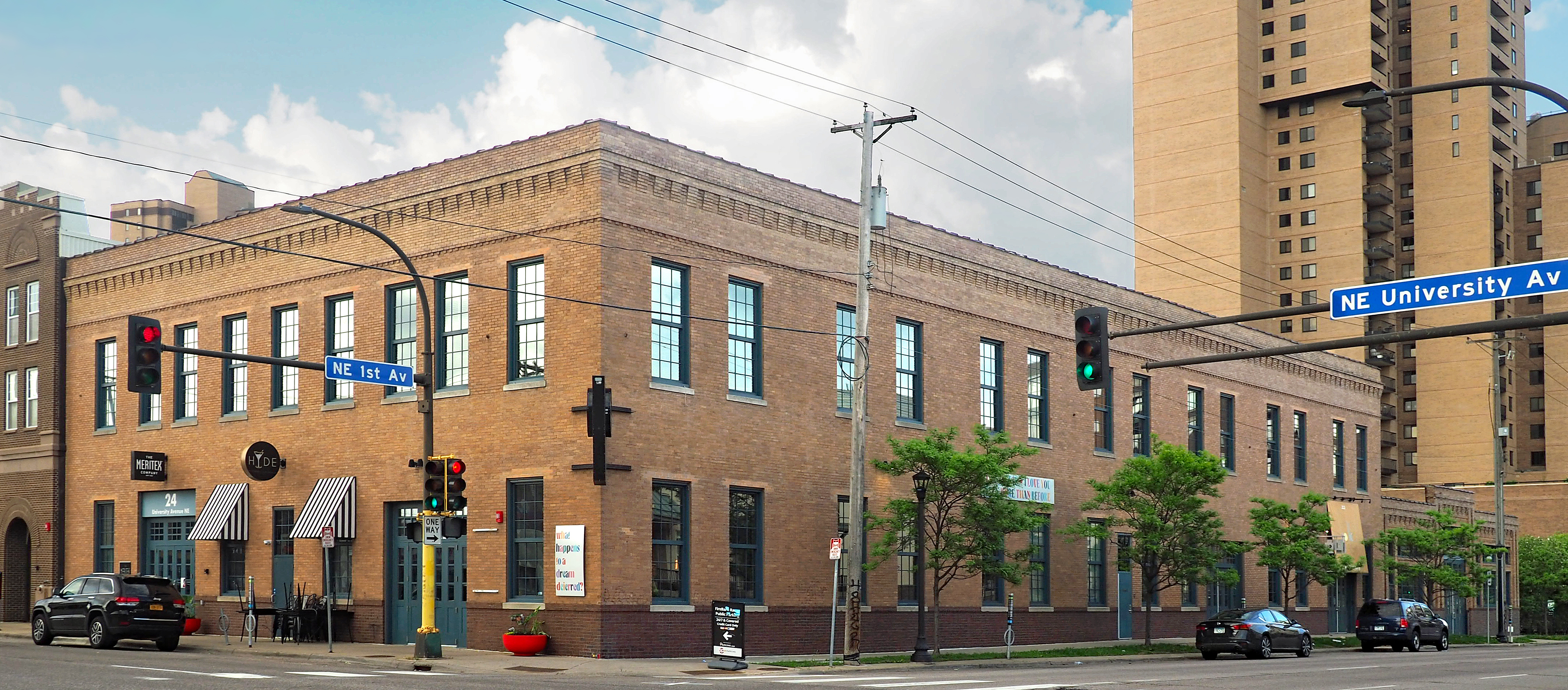
- The Minneapolis Fire Department Repair Shop from the north

- Location within Minnesota Location within the United States
- Location: 24 University Ave. NE and 222 First Ave. NE, Minneapolis, Minnesota
- Coordinates: 44°59′19″N 93°15′26″W
- Built: 1910
- Architect: Downs & Eads
- Architectural style: Early Commercial
- NRHP reference No.: 05000447
- Added to NRHP: May 19, 2005

The Minneapolis Fire Department Repair Shop is a building in Minneapolis, Minnesota listed on the National Register of Historic Places in 2005. The repair shop was established by the city of Minneapolis to reorganize and consolidate the services of the fire department. The shop was also used to convert horse-drawn fire equipment to motorized vehicles.

Between 1929 and 1932, the shop built eight large pumpers because the existing Pierce Arrow touring car chassis, the usual platform for fire equipment at the time, had insufficient capacity. Representatives of the Minneapolis Fire Department visited the Milwaukee Fire Department to learn how they were building their own new pumpers. The Minneapolis shop then started building its new pumpers using components from the Four Wheel Drive company. Four Wheel Drive built the engines, drivetrains, suspension components, and other components, while the Minneapolis Fire Department shops provided the frames, bodywork, pumping equipment, and all other firefighting equipment. The Minneapolis Fire Department also completed the assembly of these vehicles. Although the pumpers had an ungainly appearance and were hard to steer, some of these pumpers remained in active service until 1955.

As of 2014, the property has been renovated into commercial space containing a restaurant/bar and offices.

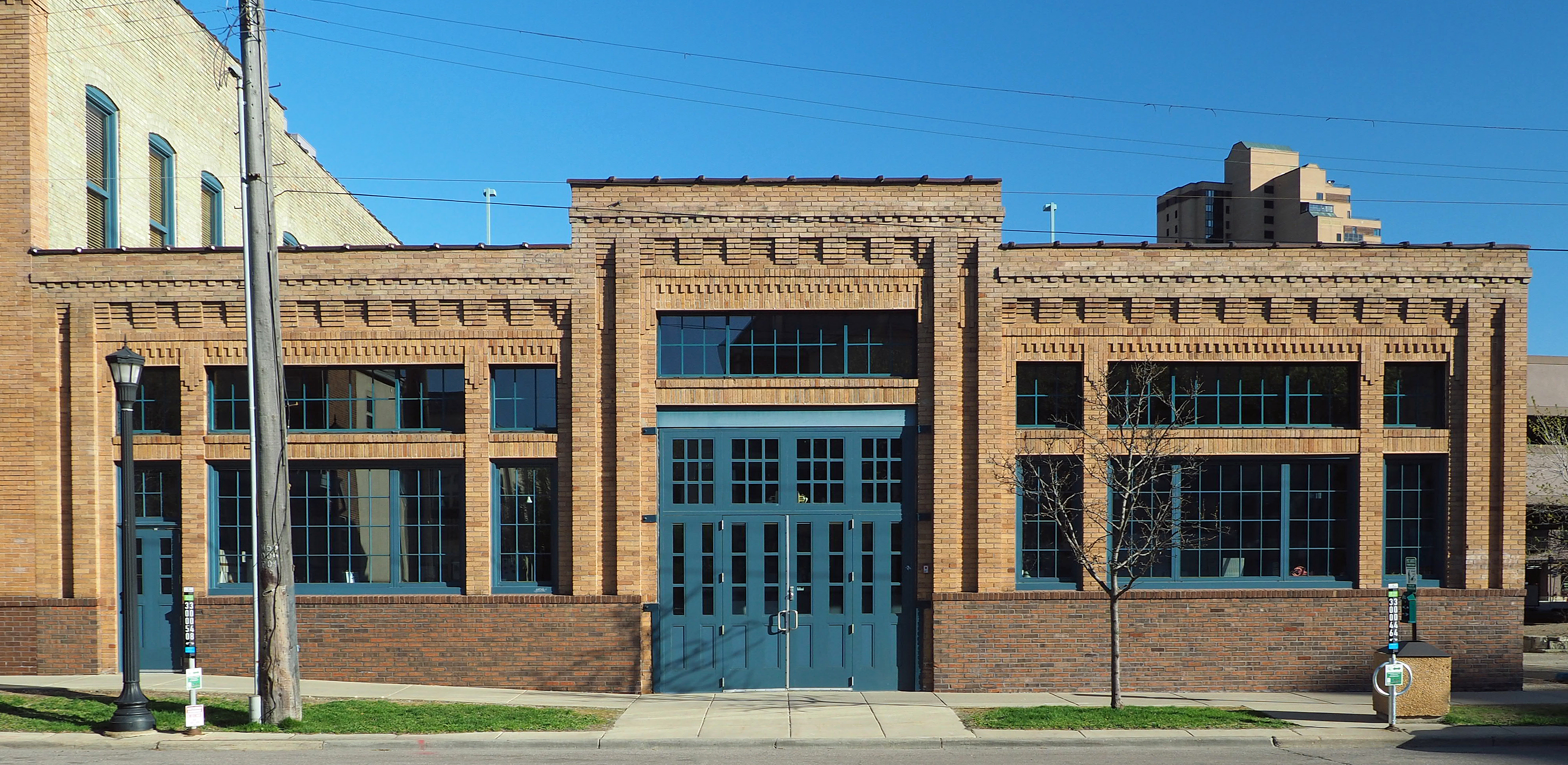
The repair shop's 1922 addition
