= Cahill School =

- U.S. National Register of Historic Places
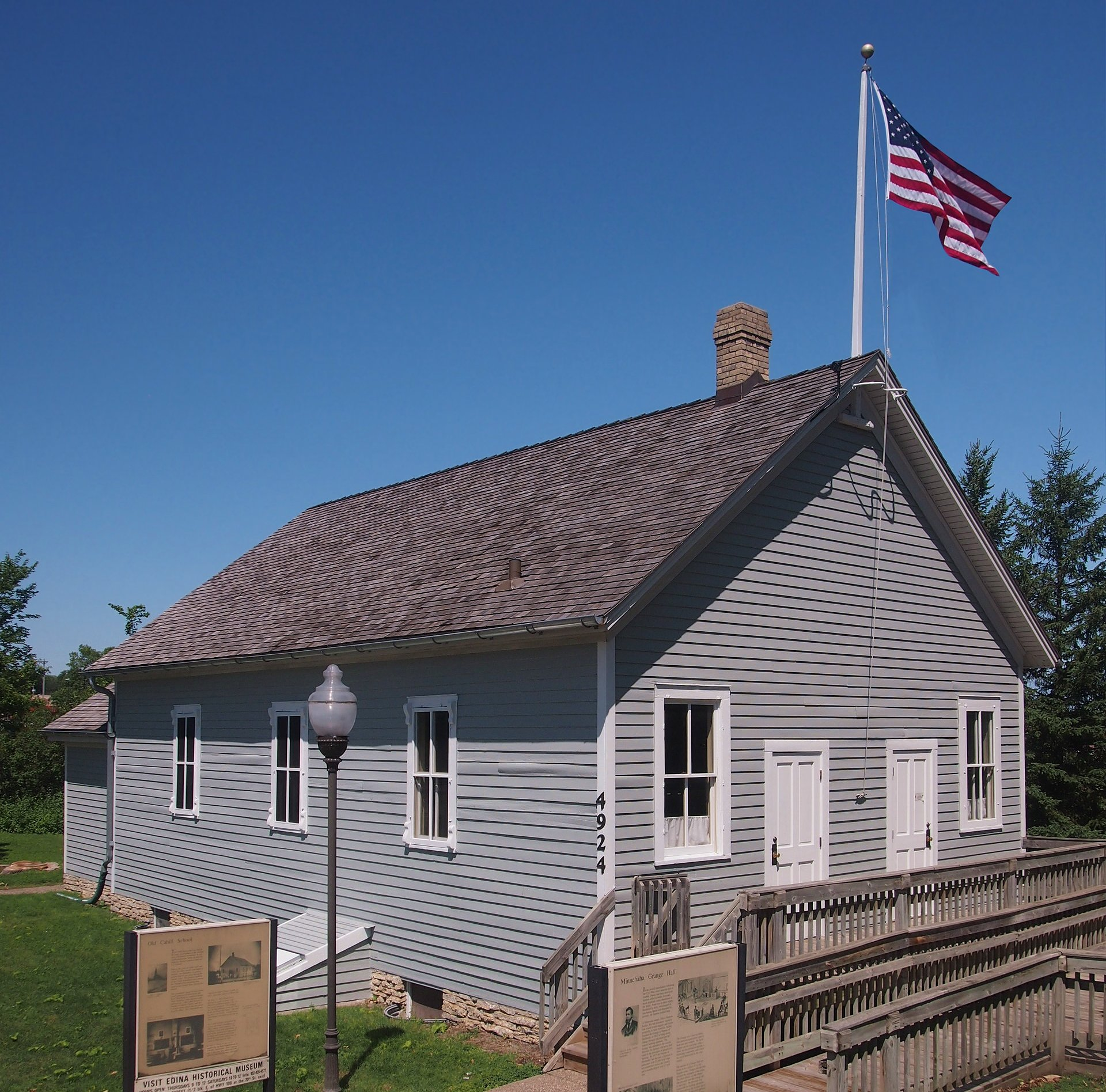
- Cahill School from the southeast

- Location within Minnesota Location within the United States
- Location: 4924 Eden Avenue, Edina, Minnesota
- Coordinates: 44°54′38.8″N 93°20′59.2″W
- Built: 1864
- NRHP reference No.: 70000297
- Added to NRHP: October 9, 1970

Cahill School is a one-room schoolhouse now located in Tupa Park near Minnesota State Highway 100 and Eden Avenue in Edina, Minnesota, United States. It is the oldest remaining building in Edina, and served as a schoolhouse, church, community center, and theater over its 94-years in use. The school continued to be used with its woodstove and outhouse until it closed in 1958. It was moved to its present location from the southeast corner of Cahill Road and West 70th Street in 1970.

The school is open for school field trips and special events.

== History ==
Cahill was an Irish community located in the western half of what was then Richfield Township. Hugh Darcy sold a two-acre property on the southeast corner of Cahill Road and West 70th Street to the school district on June 27, 1864, for five dollars. Named for Catholic missionary priest Thomas Cahill, a wood-frame schoolhouse was constructed with clapboard siding and window frame detailing evoking the Eastlake Style. The school was heated by a woodstove and had no internal plumbing. The school served grades one through eight as part of School District No. 16 of Hennepin County. It also hosted services for St. Patrick's Catholic Church.

Cahill School operated continuously from its founding until 1958 when the building was closed. The school moved to a brick building that was later demolished. The wood-frame building was restored in 1969 and relocated to Frank Tupa Park, adjacent to Minnehaha Grange Hall.
