= First Congregational Church (Minneapolis, Minnesota) =

Historic church in Minnesota, United States

- U.S. National Register of Historic Places
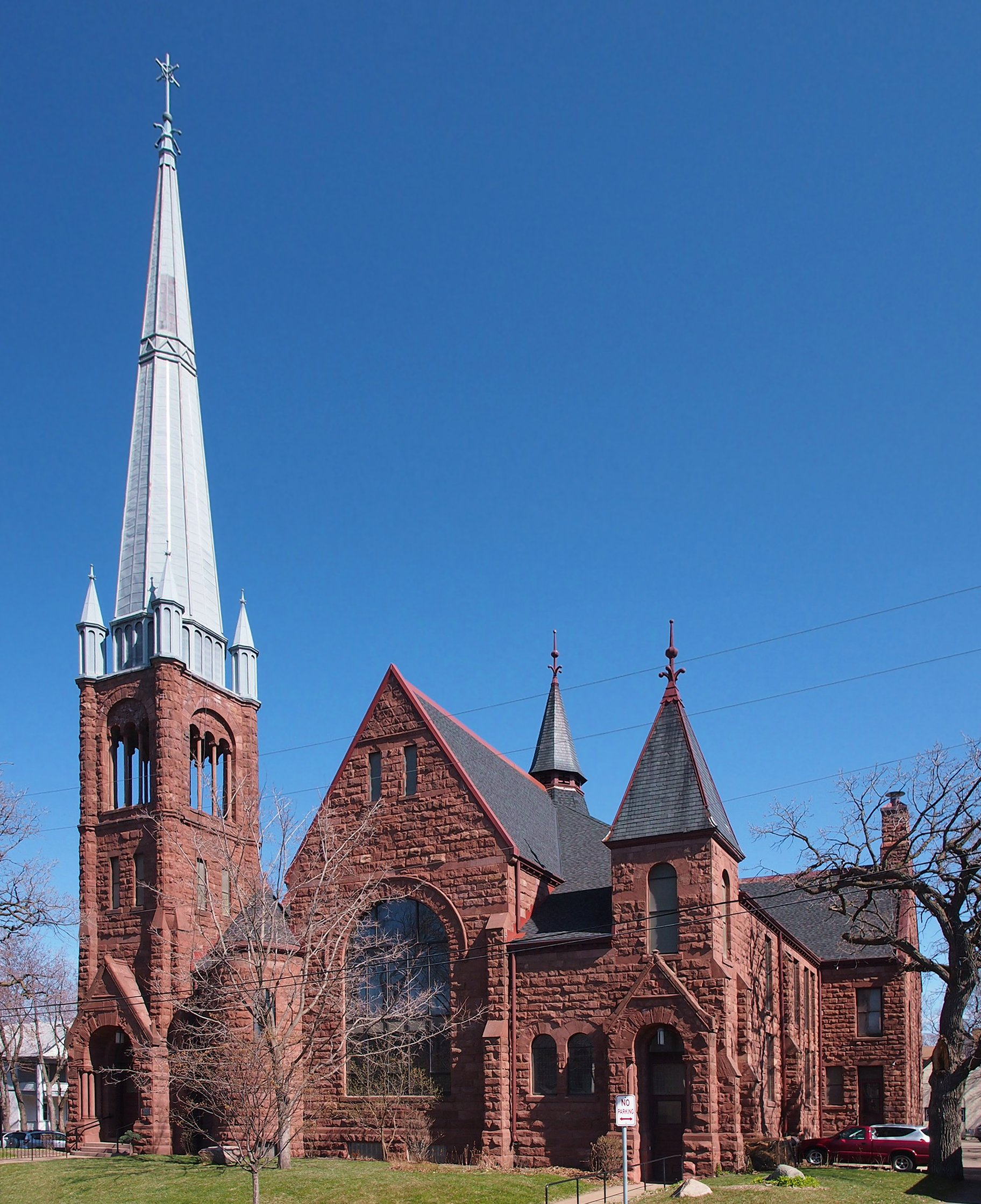
- The First Congregational Church from the south

- Location within Minnesota Location within the United States
- Location: 500 8th Avenue SE, Minneapolis, Minnesota
- Coordinates: 44°59′6″N 93°14′34″W
- Built: 1886
- Architect: Warren H. Hayes
- Architectural style: Romanesque
- NRHP reference No.: 79001249
- Added to NRHP: January 15, 1979

The First Congregational Church is a historic church building in the Marcy-Holmes neighborhood of Minneapolis, Minnesota, United States, built in 1886. It is constructed of red sandstone in Gothic-Romanesque style, featuring round-arched windows and semi-circular rows of pews. When initially completed, the building was in a residential neighborhood surrounded by mansions of prominent citizens and merchants of the time, including Octavius Broughton, Woodbury Fisk, Thomas Andrews, Horatio P. Van Cleve, William McNair, and John Dudley. Over time the neighborhood changed to a more transient population, dominated by students attending the University of Minnesota. Architect Warren H. Hayes (1847-1899) was Minneapolis' leading designer of churches in the 19th century, having designed the Calvary Baptist Church, Fowler Methodist Episcopal Church, and Wesley Methodist Episcopal Church, as well as the Central Presbyterian Church in Saint Paul.

Hubert Humphrey, 38th Vice President of the United States, was a member of this congregation.
