= Arvonne Fraser Library =

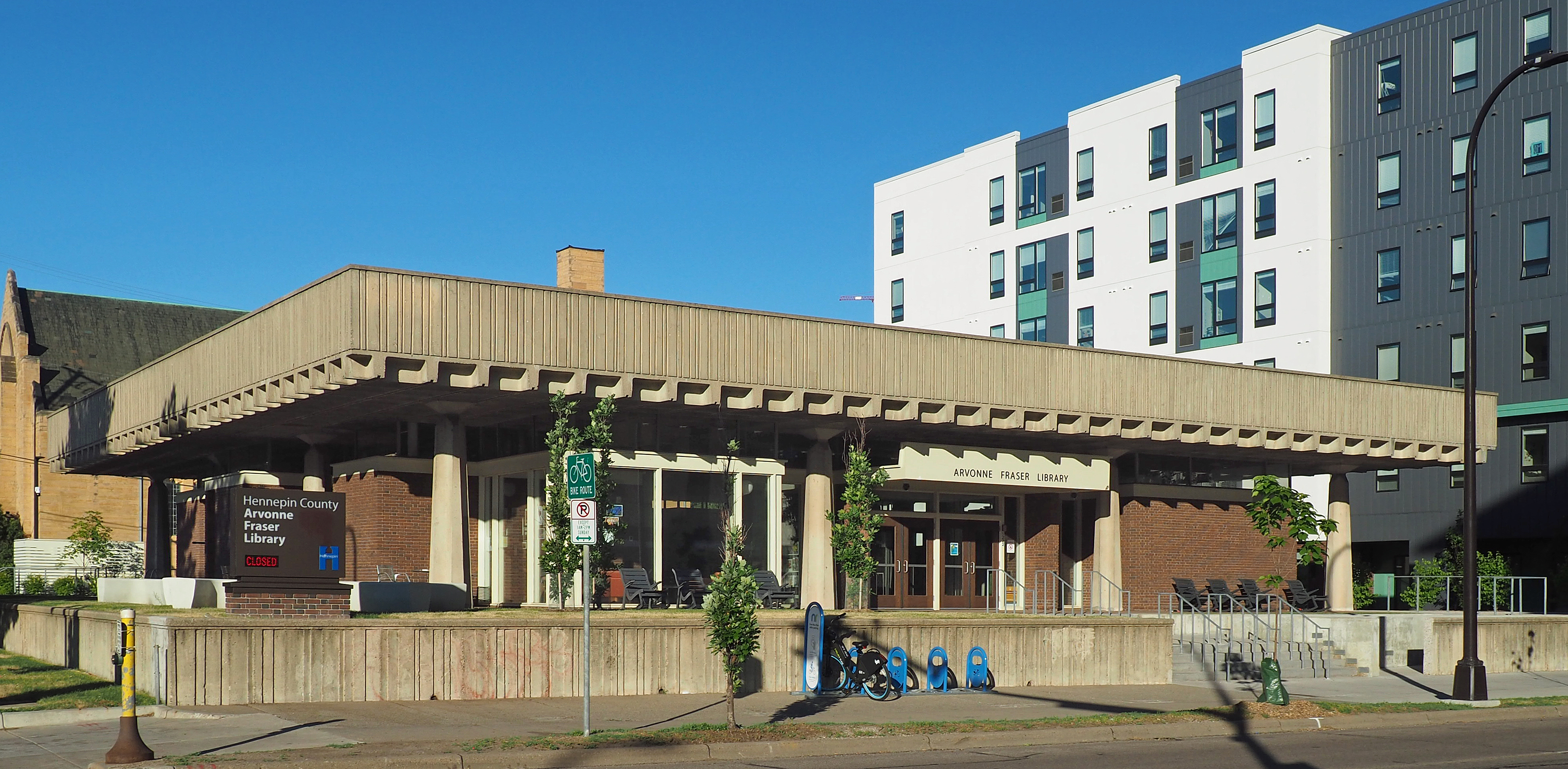
- The Arvonne Fraser Library viewed from the northeast
- Interactive map of the Arvonne Fraser Library area
- Former names: Southeast Community Library, Southeast Library

General information
- Type: Branch library
- Location: 1222 4th Street SE, Minneapolis, Minnesota
- Coordinates: 44°58′51″N 93°14′16″W
- Completed: 1963
- Renovated: 2018-2020
- Owner: Hennepin County Library System

Dimensions
- Other dimensions: Roof: 100 ft. x 100 ft.

Technical details
- Floor count: 2
- Floor area: 13186 sq. ft.

Design and construction
- Architect: Ralph Rapson

Renovating team
- Renovating firm: MacDonald and Mack (Minneapolis), Quinn Evans (D.C.), Damon Farber (Minneapolis)

Arvonne Fraser Library (formerly the Southeast Library) is a public library located on the East Bank campus of the University of Minnesota, located in the Dinkytown area of the Marcy-Holmes neighborhood in Minneapolis. It serves the residents of the University community. Designed by Ralph Rapson and built in 1963, the library is an example of brutalist architecture. Originally, the building housed a credit union for state and university employees until it was repurposed in 1967 to become the Southeast Library. After undergoing renovations from 2018 to 2020, the library was renamed in honor of Arvonne Fraser, a prominent women's rights advocate and political campaigner. Her husband, Donald M. Fraser, served as the mayor of Minneapolis.

The library was preceded by several related historical libraries, which occupied other sites throughout the area. These included branches established under the leadership of Gratia Countryman, chief librarian of the Minneapolis Public Library from 1904 to 1936.

== Predecessors ==
The Arvonne Fraser library was preceded by several others serving the same community.

=== East Side Branch, 1891–1904 ===
The third branch of the Minneapolis Public library opened on November 1, 1891, in the old Winthrop School building at 22 University Avenue Southeast. It was replaced by the Pillsbury Library in 1904.

=== Pillsbury Library, 1904–1967 ===
John Sargent Pillsbury, Minnesota's eighth governor, offered to build a branch library at the corner of university and Central Avenues in old St. Anthony (later East Minneapolis). The location was a few blocks from the iconic Pillsbury "A" Mill and close to the governor's home. Although Pillsbury died before the library opened in April, 1904, the family carried out the gift. One of the most beautiful library branches in Minneapolis, the library was built out of marble and featured mahogany inside. In 1960 a new Central Library opened right across the river from the Pillsbury Library so a location closer to the University Community's core was sought. The Southeast Library replaced the Pillsbury Library in 1967.

Located at 100 University Avenue Southeast, after many years as the Dolly Fiterman gallery, the Pillsbury Library more recently housed the Phillips Foundation.

=== Seven Corners Library, 1906-1964 ===
A successful delivery station was replaced in 1906 by the Seven Corners Branch in a rented space at 231 Cedar Avenue. The Seven Corners (Cedar-Riverside) area was teeming with new immigrants and the library was quite busy. A permanent Seven Corners branch was built at 300 15th Ave. South in 1912. By 1964 the library's circulation numbers paled in comparison to its first decades of existence. The building was sold to the Minnesota Department of Transportation and was razed for highway construction.

== Southeast Library, 1967-2018 ==
In 1960, architect Ralph Rapson was asked to design a university-area building for the State Capitol Credit Union, a banking organization serving university and state employees. Sited at 1222 Fourth Street Southeast, the building was purchased for conversion to a library on December 29, 1966. The building reopened as the Southeast Library on December 26, 1967.

The library's most notable feature is its square concrete roof, 100 feet on each side. Seen from below, the ceiling is divided into a "waffle-like" form, a 32x32 grid of 1024 cells. This canopy is supported by 16 evenly-spaced pillars and is dotted by 22 skylights—three central 2x2 lights, and 19 smaller 1x1 lights.

Southeast Library and 14 other libraries of Minneapolis Public Library were merged into the combined urban/suburban Hennepin County Library in 2008.

== Arvonne Fraser Library, 2019-present ==
On December 10, 2018, the library closed for a year-long, $11.6 million renovation. The next day, the Hennepin County Board of Commissioners voted to rename the library after Fraser. Following completion of the renovation, the Arvonne Fraser Library reopened on Saturday January 25, 2020. The renovation doubled the library's square footage by improving a disused basement space, which houses inventory and a children's area. To connect the two floors and to allow natural light into the windowless basement space, an opening was cut in the center of the ground level.

Arvonne Fraser and nearby historical libraries
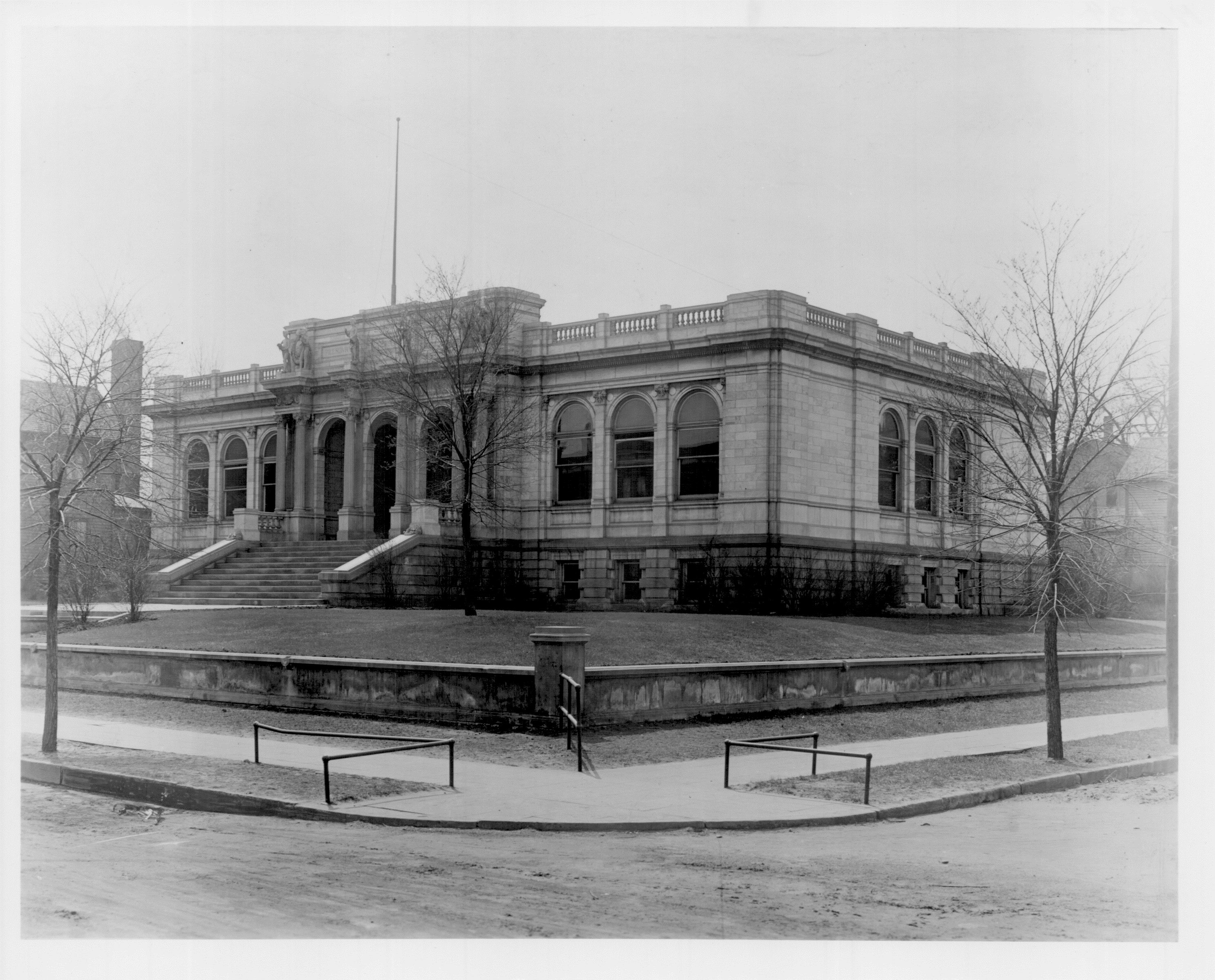
The Pillsbury Library replaced the East Side Branch (1891-1904) as part of the Minneapolis Public Library system from 1904-1967.

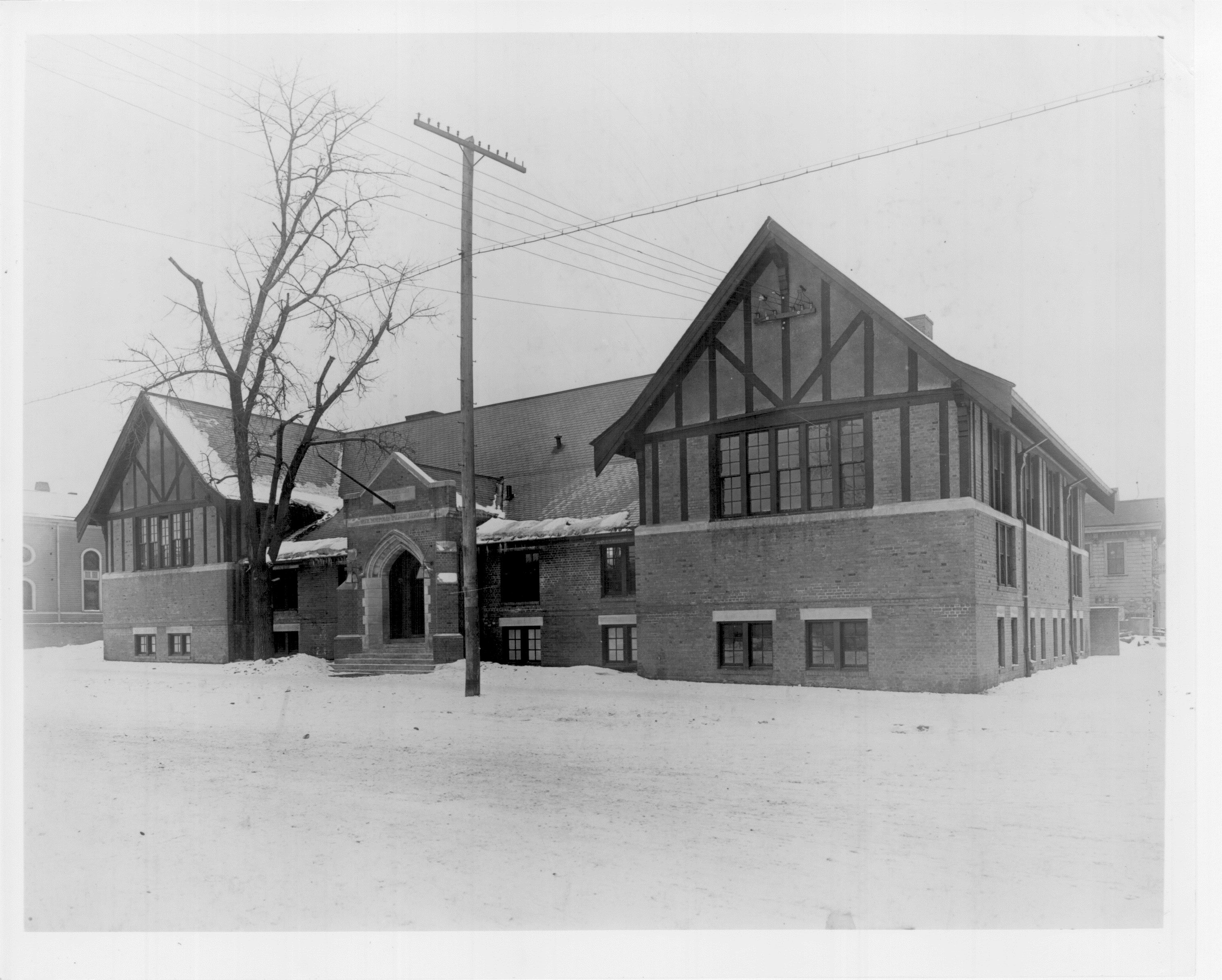
The Seven Corners Library was a branch of the Minneapolis Public Library from 1906-1964.

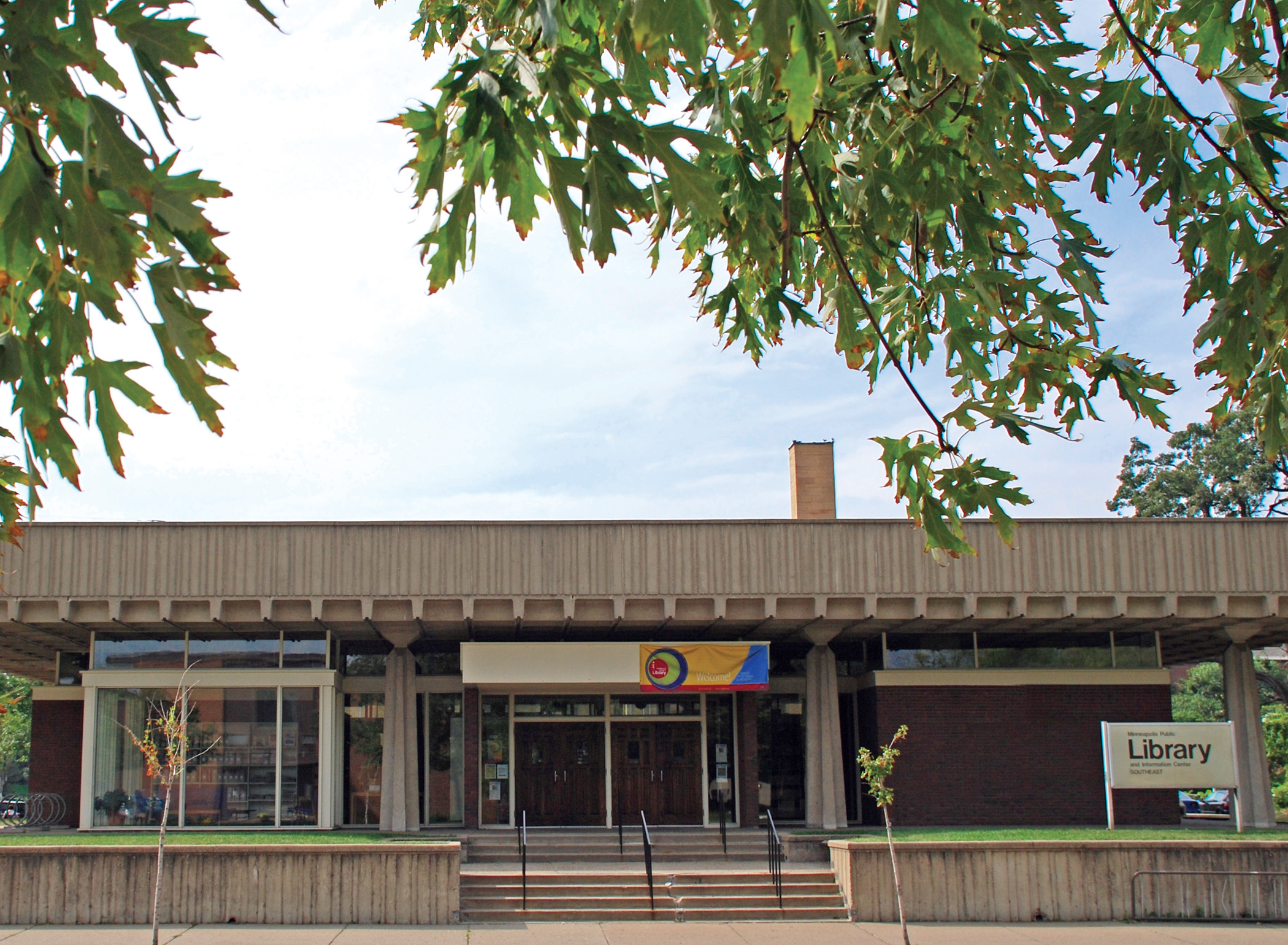
Southeast Library, built 1963, converted to a library in 1967. Currently part of the Hennepin County Library system.

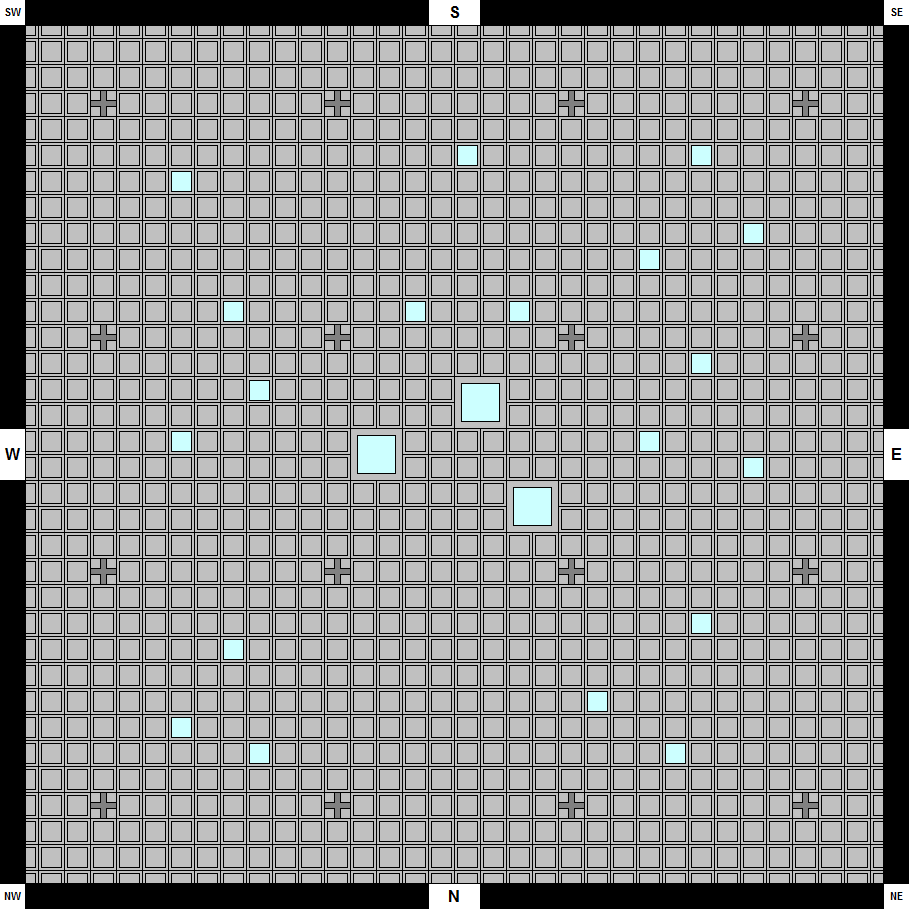
Schematic of the library's ceiling, as seen from below.
