= Wesley United Methodist Church (Minneapolis, Minnesota) =

Historic church in Minnesota, United States

- Wesley Methodist Episcopal Church
- U.S. National Register of Historic Places
- Minneapolis Landmark
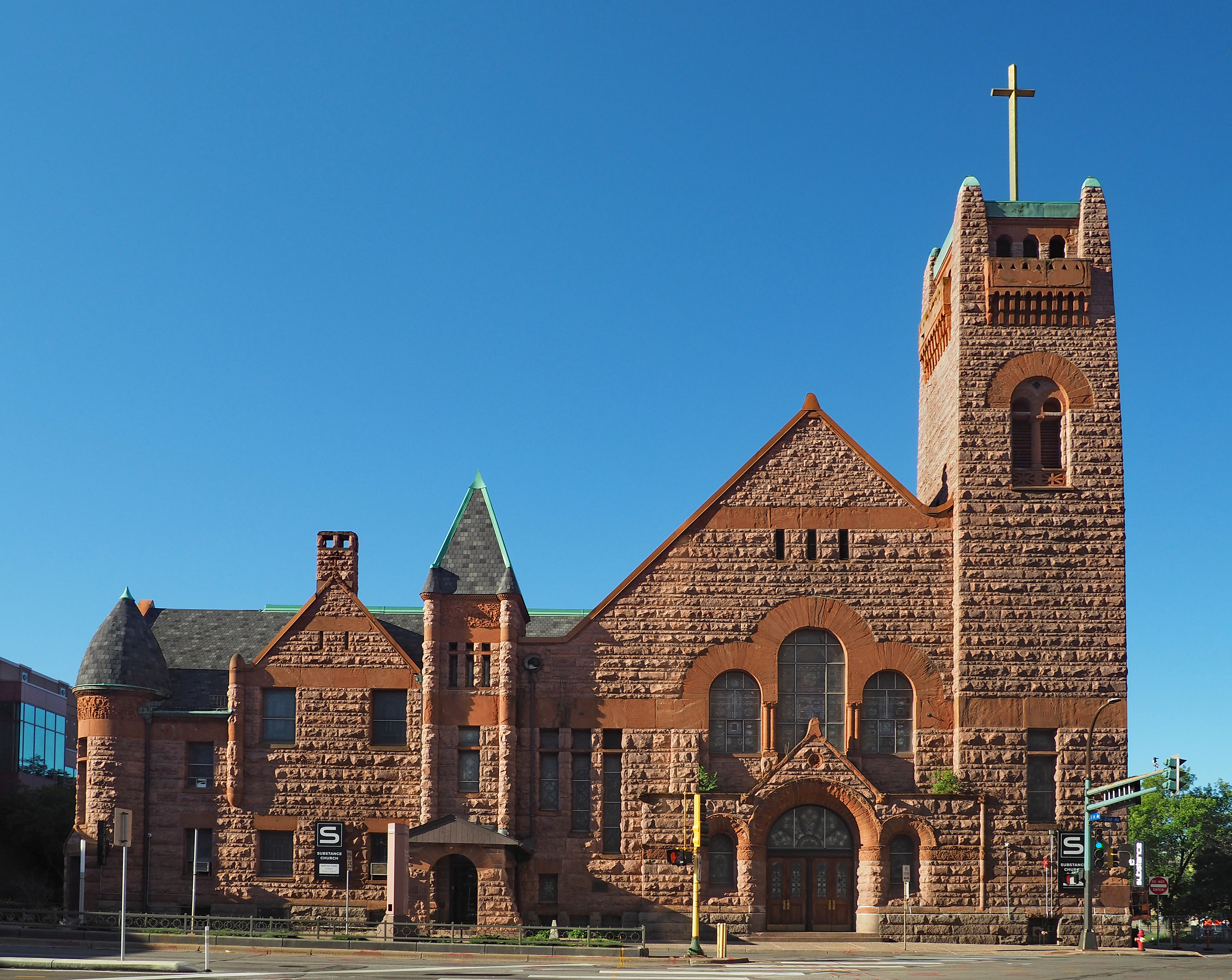
- Wesley United Methodist Church from the north

- Location within Minnesota Location within the United States
- Location: 101 E. Grant St. Minneapolis, Minnesota
- Coordinates: 44°58′10.6″N 93°16′34″W
- Built: 1891
- Architect: Warren H. Hayes
- Architectural style: Romanesque
- NRHP reference No.: 84001469

Significant dates
- Added to NRHP: February 9, 1984
- Designated MPLSL: 1984

The Wesley United Methodist Church (formerly the Wesley Methodist Episcopal Church) building was constructed of granite, stone, brick, and sandstone in Richardsonian Romanesque style, featuring round-arched windows and multiple towers. When built, the building was in the residential neighborhood of Loring Park at 101 Grant Street East; it was built during Minneapolis' building boom in the last decade of the 19th century. Architect Warren H. Hayes (1847–1899) was Minneapolis' leading designer of churches in the 19th century, having designed the Calvary Baptist Church, Fowler Methodist Episcopal Church, and the First Congregational Church, as well as the Central Presbyterian Church in Saint Paul. Today the location is overwhelmed by the neighboring Minneapolis Convention Center.

The church was renamed Wesley United Methodist Church when the Methodist Episcopal Church and Evangelical United Brethren Church merged in 1968. The Preservation Alliance of Minnesota listed it on its 2010 10 Most Endangered Historic Places list.

The church is currently occupied by Substance Church.
