= American Academy of Acupuncture and Oriental Medicine =

The American Academy of Acupuncture and Oriental Medicine (AAAOM) is a private graduate school of traditional Oriental medicine and acupuncture in Roseville, Minnesota. It was established in 1997 in response to the encouragement of staff and faculty at the Shandong University of Traditional Chinese Medicine in Jinan, China. Classes began in 1999 in a small collection of rooms in the University Technology Center building in Dinkytown, near the University of Minnesota. At that time there were about 40 full and part-time students and the school consisted of two class rooms, four treatment rooms and a small series of adjoining offices which served as reception, administration office and pharmacy. The one clinic consultation room was little more than a closet with a window and enough space for a desk and two chairs.

== Campus ==
The American Academy of Acupuncture and Oriental Medicine occupies its own campus with a traditional herbal pharmacy, five classrooms, 12 treatment rooms, student clinic, student lounge, a study room with internet access, a large practice space for events and tai chi classes as well as a library of Traditional Chinese Medicine (TCM) literature in Chinese and English in the United States.

== Academics ==
AAAOM offers a Master of Science degree in acupuncture and Oriental medicine.

The school's faculty include eight Chinese scholar–physicians from who have made contributions to the field of Traditional Chinese Medicine (TCM). Collectively they have published over 600 articles, textbooks, research papers and reference books in China and the United States. Biomedicine classes are taught by Western doctors and chiropractors trained in the United States.

=== Accreditation ===
The Master of Science in Acupuncture and Oriental Medicine program of the AAAOM is accredited by the Accreditation Commission for Acupuncture and Oriental Medicine (ACAOM), which is the recognized accrediting agency for the approval of programs preparing acupuncture and Oriental medicine practitioners.

=== Minnesota license requirements for practice ===
Minnesota requires passage of the National Certification Commission for Acupuncture and Oriental Medicine (NCCAOM) acupuncture examination in order to practice in the state. Minnesota Board of Medical Practice is licensing agency for practicing acupuncture in Minnesota. Graduates from the Acupuncture and Oriental Medicine program at the American Academy of Acupuncture and Oriental Medicine, which is an accredited program with the Accreditation Commission for Acupuncture and Oriental Medicine (ACAOM), are qualified to take the NCCAOM exams. AAAOM prepares its students for national certification by the National Commission for the Certification of Acupuncture and Oriental Medicine (NCCAOM).
