= Arvonne Fraser =

American political activist

First Lady of Minneapolis
- In office January 1, 1980 – December 31, 1993
- Preceded by: Emma Hofstede
- Succeeded by: Steven Belton (as First Gentleman)

Personal details
- Born: Arvonne Skelton; September 1, 1925 Lamberton, Minnesota, U.S.
- Died: August 7, 2018 (aged 92) Hudson, Wisconsin, U.S.
- Party: Democratic (DFL)
- Spouse(s): Perry Morgan (m. 1946, div. 1949); Donald M. Fraser (m. 1950)
- Children: 6 (and seven grandchildren)
- Parent(s): Orland Delbert; Phyllis Du Frene Skelton
- Education: University of Minnesota
- Occupation: U.S. Ambassador to the United Nations Commission on the Status of Women
- Known for: Women's rights activist

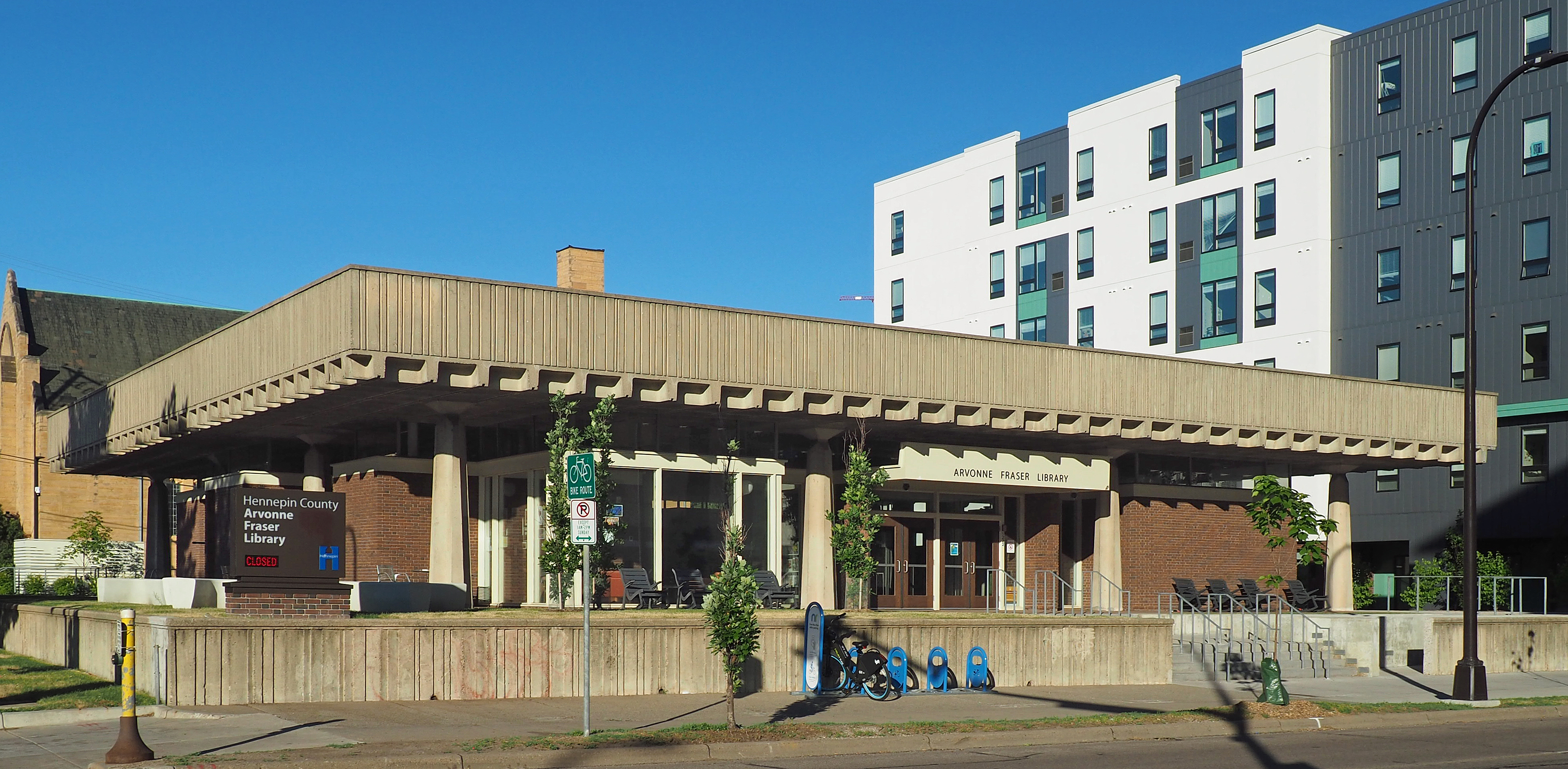
Arvonne Fraser Library, 1222 4th St SE, Minneapolis, Minnesota, USA. Viewed from the northeast.

Arvonne Skelton Fraser (September 1, 1925 – August 7, 2018) was an American women's rights advocate and political campaigner. She held the position of senior fellow at the Humphrey Institute of Public Affairs, University of Minnesota, and from 1993 to 1994 was the U.S. ambassador to the United Nations Commission on the Status of Women. She also managed the political campaigns of her husband Donald M. Fraser during his career, from 1954 to 1979.

== Early life ==
Fraser was born on September 1, 1925, in Lamberton, Minnesota, to parents Orland Delbert and Phyllis Dufrene Skelton. She grew up on their family farm and attended Lamberton High School, graduating in 1943. In 1948, she received a Bachelor of Arts degree in liberal arts from the University of Minnesota. While studying there, she had her first experience of working on a political campaign when she worked in the office of Hubert Humphrey’s U.S. Senate campaign.

== Career ==
Following graduation, Fraser began her career in Minnesota Democratic–Farmer–Labor Party (DFL) politics, editing the party newsletter and acting as secretary for the state chairperson. She became vice-chair of the party in 1956, a position she held until 1962. In 1960 Fraser was active in the Minnesotan Citizens for Kennedy campaign and co-chaired Arthur Naftalin's successful mayoral election campaign. She served on the Minneapolis Board of Public Welfare from 1961 to 1963, and she became active in the women's rights movement, serving as national president of Women's Equity Action League from 1972 to 1974 and as the first director of the WEAL Fund Intern Program.

In 1976, Fraser led the Carter-Mondale presidential campaign in the Upper Midwest. After the election victory, she was appointed Counselor, Office of Presidential Personnel in the Jimmy Carter administration, and later served as director of the Office of Women in Development at the United States Agency for International Development from 1977 to 1981. She was a U.S. representative to the United Nations Commission on the Status of Women, and was a member of the U.S. delegations to the first two UN World Conferences on Women.

Fraser was a senior fellow at the Humphrey Institute of Public Affairs, University of Minnesota, from 1982 to 1994. At the Humphrey Institute (now the Humphrey School), she directed the International Women's Rights Action Watch (IWRAW) and cofounded the school's Center on Women and Public Policy. In June 1986, Fraser entered the campaign for Lieutenant Governor of Minnesota alongside George Latimer; the pair lost the DFL primary. From 1993 to 1994, she served as U.S. ambassador to the United Nations Commission on the Status of Women.

Alongside her own career, Fraser ran the political campaigns of her husband, including for his elections to the Minnesota Senate (1954–1962), the U.S. House of Representatives (1963–1979) and the mayoralty of Minneapolis (1980–1993). Every campaign she managed for him resulted in a successful election outcome.

=== Recognition and legacy ===
In 1979, she received an Honorary Doctor of Laws from Macalester College. In 2007, she received the Outstanding Achievement Award from the University of Minnesota. In 1992, she received a Resourceful Woman Award for women's human rights from the Tides Foundation. In 1995, she received the Prominent Women in International Law Award, Women's Interest Group, American Society of International Law, becoming the first non-lawyer to receive this award.

Fraser also received the Louis B. Sohn Human Rights Award from the U.N. Association, the Superior Honor Award from the U.S. Agency for International Development, and the Elizabeth Boyer Award from WEAL. She received the Minneapolis YWCA’s Outstanding Achievement Award and the Minneapolis International Citizen Award.

The Arvonne Fraser Library in Dinkytown was named after her in 2019.

== Personal life ==
She married Perry Morgan in 1946; they divorced in 1949. In 1950, she married Donald M. Fraser, and the couple had six children (Thomas, Mary, John, Lois, Anne, and Jean) and seven grandchildren.

Fraser died on August 7, 2018, at her family retreat near the St. Croix River in Hudson, Wisconsin, at the age of 92.

== Selected bibliography ==
=== Books ===
- Fraser, Arvonne (1970). Government. Minneapolis: Dillon Press. ISBN 978-0-87518-023-6.
- Fraser, Arvonne (1974). Office occupations. Minneapolis: Dillon Press. ISBN 978-0-87518-035-9.
- Fraser, Arvonne; Huston, Perdita (1979). Third world women speak out: interviews in six countries on change, development, and basic needs. New York London etc: Praeger for the Overseas Development Council. ISBN 978-0-03-052116-4.
- Fraser, Arvonne (1987). The U.N. Decade for Women: documents and dialogue. Boulder, Colorado: Westview Press. ISBN 978-0-8133-7249-5.
- Fraser, Arvonne; Tinker, Irene (2004). Developing power: how women transformed international development. New York: Feminist Press at the City University of New York. ISBN 978-1-55861-484-0.
- Fraser, Arvonne (2007). She's no lady: politics, family, and international feminism. Minneapolis, Minnesota: Nodin Press. ISBN 978-1-932472-64-6.

=== Book chapters ===
- Fraser, Arvonne S. (2001). "Becoming human: the origins and development of women's human rights". In Agosín, Marjorie (ed.). Women, gender, and human rights: a global perspective. New Brunswick, New Jersey: Rutgers University Press. pp. 15–64. ISBN 978-0-8135-2983-7. A reprint of Fraser, Arvonne S. (November 1999). "Becoming human: the origins and development of women's human rights". Human Rights Quarterly. 21 (4): 853–906. doi:10.1353/hrq.1999.0050. S2CID 143911777. Also available online through the University of Minnesota, Human Rights Library.
