= Lodi Methodist Church =

Historic church in New York, United States

- U.S. National Register of Historic Places
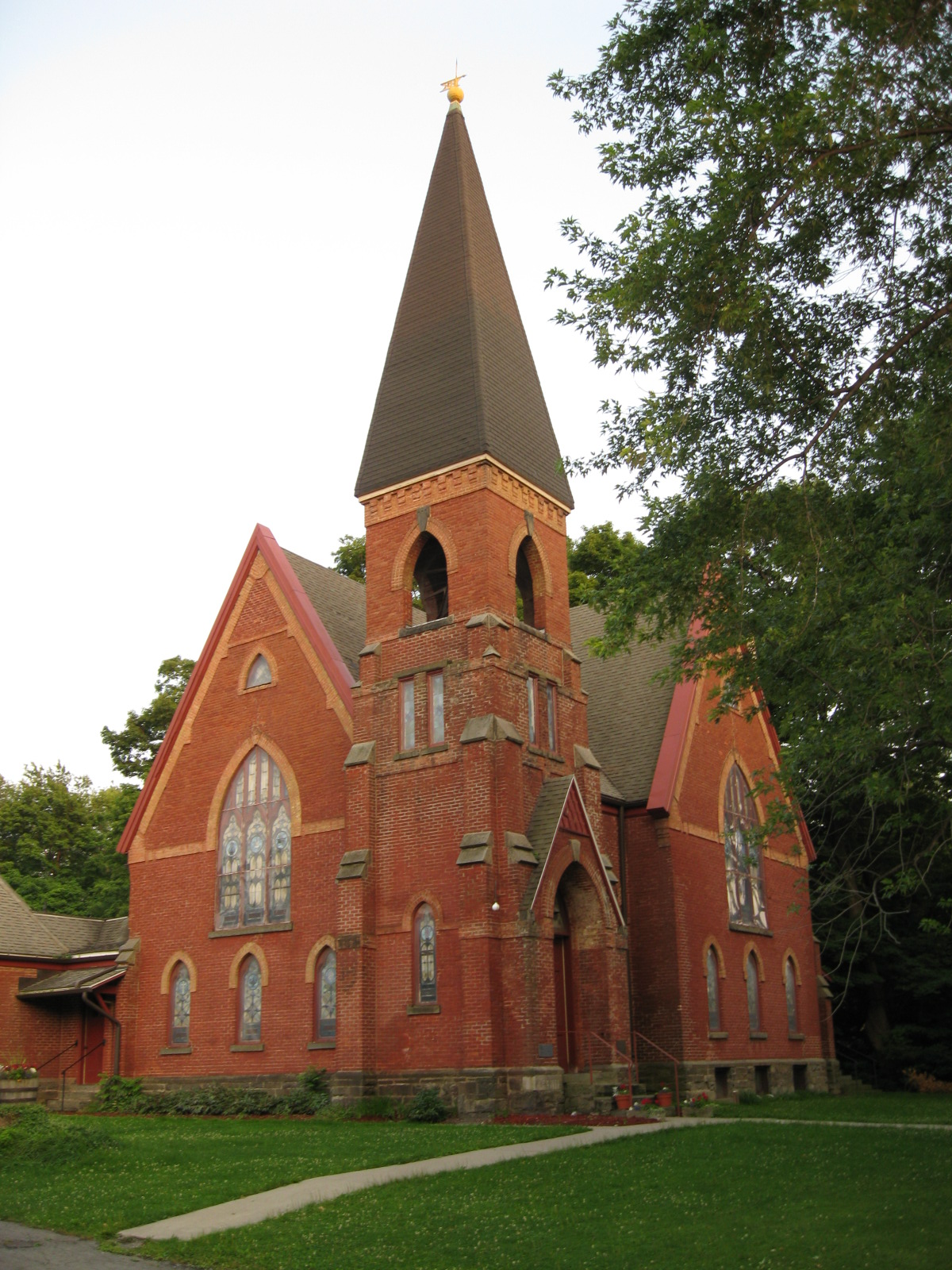
- Lodi Methodist Church, August 2009

- Location within New York Location within the United States
- Location: S. Main and Grove Sts., Lodi, New York
- Coordinates: 42°36′45″N 76°49′22″W
- Area: 0.5 acres (0.20 ha)
- Built: 1880
- Architect: Hayes, Warren H.
- Architectural style: Gothic
- NRHP reference No.: 82003405
- Added to NRHP: May 06, 1982

Lodi Methodist Church is a historic Methodist church located at Lodi in Seneca County, New York. It was constructed in 1880 and it consists of a main block with four steeply pitched gables, a corner bell tower, and a large single story rear wing. It is built of brick with a coursed stone foundation and water table. It was designed by noted church architect Warren H. Hayes (1847–1899).

It was listed on the National Register of Historic Places in 1982.

== Gallery ==
Methodist Episcopal Church at Lodi, New York, American Architect and Building News, July 29, 1882
