= Woodbury Fisk House =

Historic house in Minnesota, United States

- U.S. National Register of Historic Places
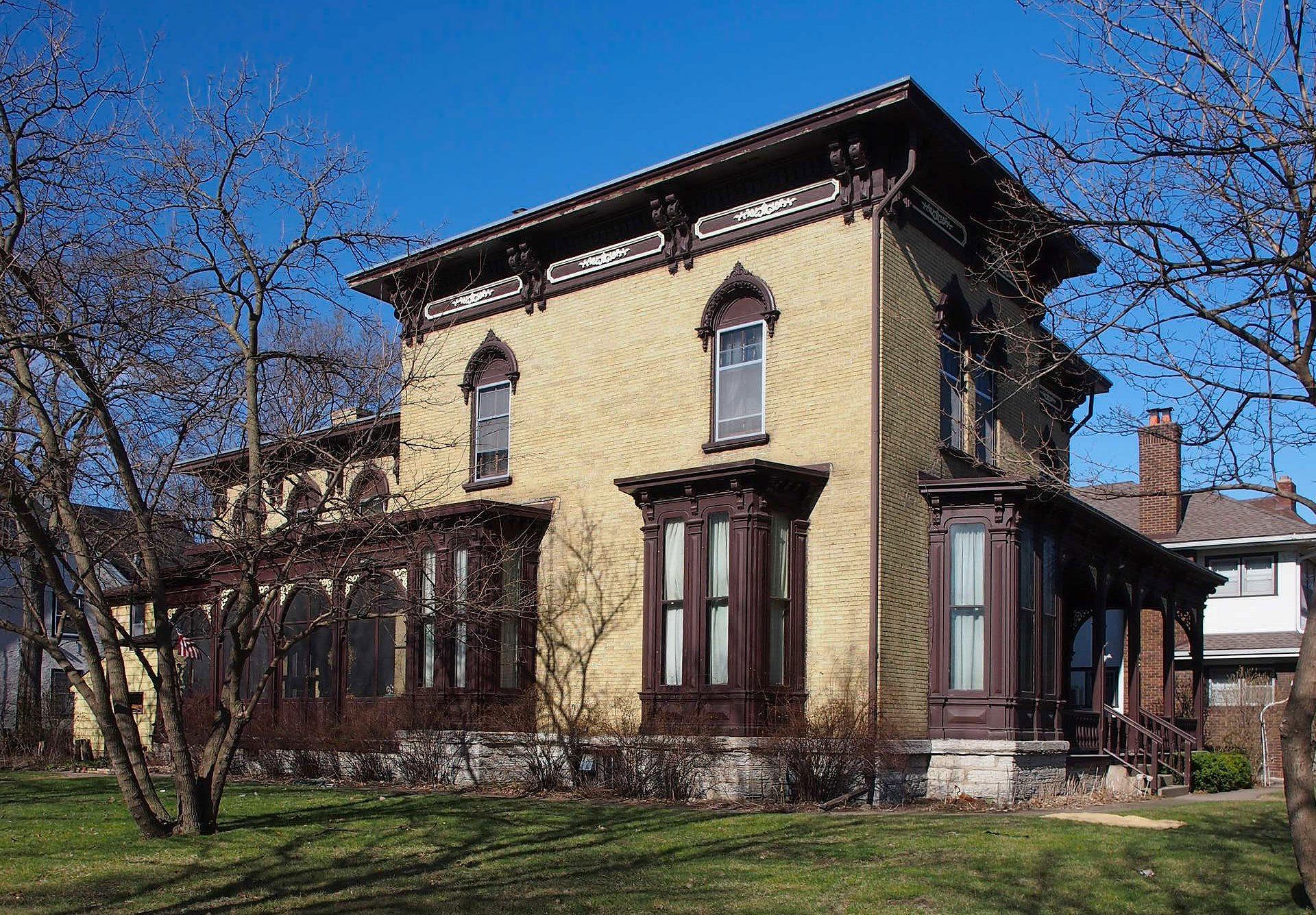
- The Woodbury Fisk House from the east

- Location within Minnesota Location within the United States
- Location: 424 5th Street SE, Minneapolis, Minnesota
- Coordinates: 44°59′10.7″N 93°14′53″W
- Area: Less than one acre
- Built: 1869
- Architectural style: Italianate
- NRHP reference No.: 83003654
- Designated: October 6, 1983

The Woodbury Fisk House is a historic house in the Marcy-Holmes neighborhood of Minneapolis, Minnesota, United States, built in 1869. It was listed on the National Register of Historic Places in 1983 for its local significance in the theme of architecture. It was nominated for being the most elaborate example of Italianate architecture—and one of the style's most intact specimens—in the city of Minneapolis.

== Description ==
The Woodbury Fisk House rises two stories on a corner lot. It is constructed of buff-colored brick upon a limestone foundation topped with a water table. The original wing is L-shaped. An addition projecting to the rear also contains two stories but is eight feet (2.4 m) shorter. The addition is similar in style and material to the main section, suggesting it was built fairly soon after the original construction. A third, more recent addition at the rear is a one-story frame garage.

Elements of Italianate style include the extended eaves supported by prominent brackets, hooded arch windows, and an ornamented porch. In the case of the Woodbury Fisk House, the eaves are supported by scrolled brackets emerging in pairs from a dentilated and panelled cornice. The moulded window hoods are fairly simple on the first floor but sport a center crest and carved leaf design on the second. The arches, however, have been infilled following the installation of modern rectangular windows.

Both street-facing façades have ornamented porches conjoined to a projecting bay with tall, narrow windows. The front porch is open while the side porch is screened in. Both have arch supports with ornately carved spandrels and balusters. The main entrance consists of double doors topped with a stained glass transom window. The front yard features two mulberry trees.

== History ==
Woodbury Fisk (1826–1889) was born in Warner, New Hampshire. He came to Minnesota in 1855 or '56 with John S. Pillsbury and Thomas F. Andrews, friends who would each marry one of Fisk's sisters. Fisk and Pillsbury initially established themselves in business supplying hardware to the lumber industry, prospering enough by 1869 that Fisk could commission this house. With a third partner, the two men later founded the flour milling company of Pillsbury, Crocker, and Fisk. This was to be Fisk's primary livelihood for the rest of his life, though he also had business interests in the Minneapolis, St. Paul and Sault Ste. Marie Railroad and served as a director for two banks.

Fisk married and had three daughters. In November 1888 he was beset by an outbreak of carbuncles, which reportedly sapped his formerly robust health. Fisk died in the house on January 18, 1889, mere days after his 63rd birthday. An obituary read: "though of quiet and unostentatious manner, he was a man whose good humor and hearty cheerfulness were felt wherever he went."

Historian Roger G. Kennedy discusses the house in his 2006 book Historic Homes of Minnesota but identifies it as the home of Hennepin County sheriff John A. Armstrong (1831–1878).

== See also ==
- National Register of Historic Places listings in Hennepin County, Minnesota
