= B. O. Cutter House =

Historic house in Minnesota, United States

- U.S. National Register of Historic Places
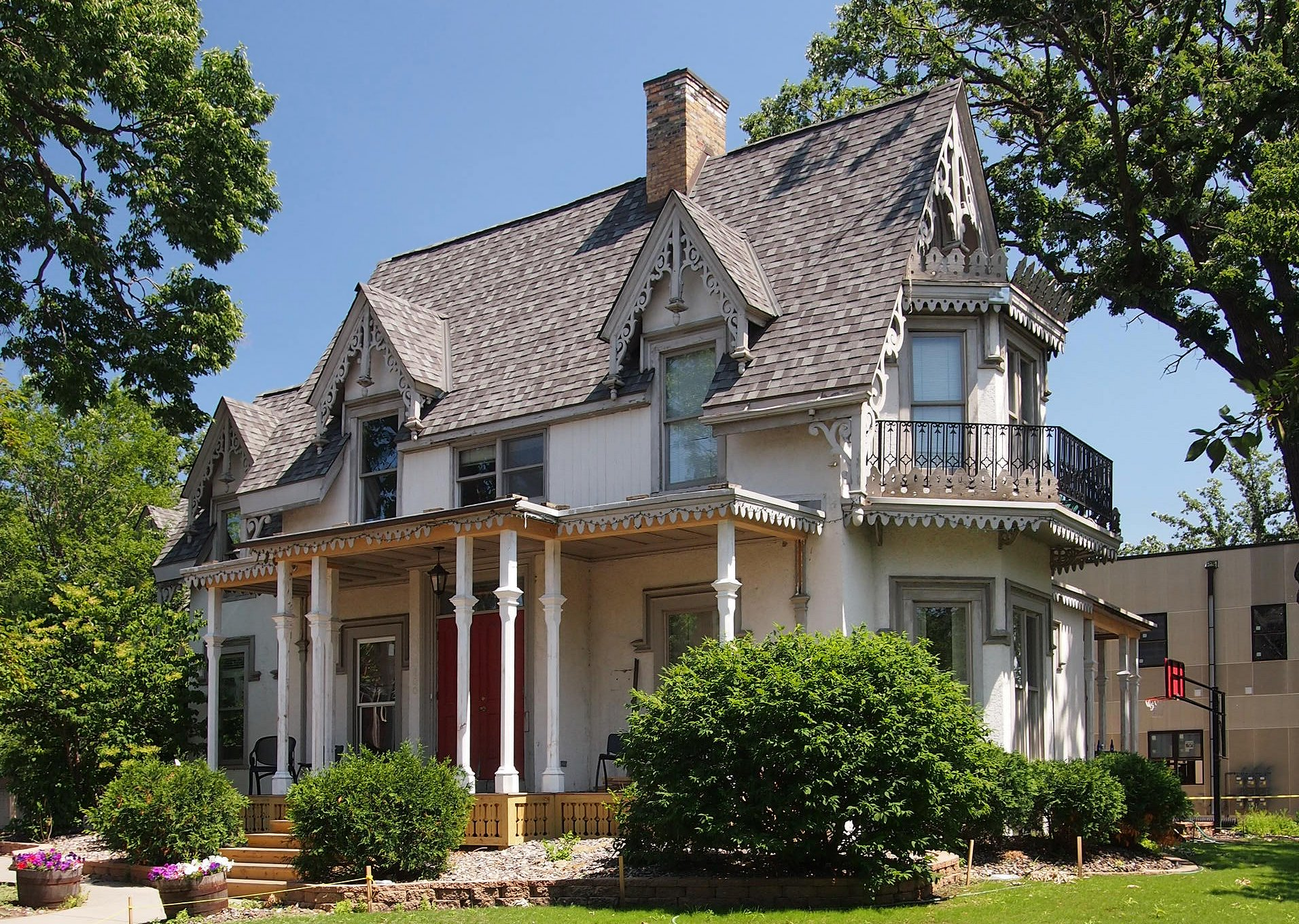
- The B. O. Cutter House from the west

- Location within Minnesota Location within the United States
- Location: 400 10th Avenue Southeast, Minneapolis, Minnesota
- Coordinates: 44°58′58″N 93°14′27″W
- Built: 1856
- Architect: B.O. Cutter
- Architectural style: Gothic Revival
- NRHP reference No.: 76001058
- Added to NRHP: January 30, 1976

The B.O. Cutter House is a house in the Marcy-Holmes neighborhood of Minneapolis, Minnesota, United States. It was built in 1856 by master carpenter B.O. Cutter, who was working on other buildings around the University of Minnesota. He built this house on the outskirts of the campus at the time. The house was built in the Carpenter Gothic style with hand-carved molding around the eaves. In 1869, he sold the house to John Gilfillan, who was an educator, regent of the University of Minnesota, banker, attorney, and a U.S. representative in the 49th United States Congress.

The house was remodeled in 1943, at which point it was covered in stucco. The interior was remodeled in 1949 to accommodate the Theta Delta Chi fraternity. It was heavily damaged in a 1992 fire, but was restored. It now houses the local chapter of the Sigma Phi Epsilon fraternity. The house was listed on the National Register of Historic Places in 1976.
