= First Congregational Church (Salt Lake City, Utah) =

Coordinates: 40.7244°N 111.8146°W

The First Congregational Church of Salt Lake City, Utah is a Congregational church affiliated with the National Association of Congregational Christian Churches. Established in 1865, it was the first church not a part of the Church of Jesus Christ of Latter-day Saints (LDS Church) in Utah. The congregation started Utah's first free public schools.

== History ==
=== Founding and construction of first building ===
The church was founded in a period when mining activity had started to attract non-Mormons to the Utah Territory. The American Home Missionary Society sent minister Norman McLeod to the Utah Territory to minister to military personnel and other non-Mormons, as well as to evangelize to the Mormon population. The first worship service that McLeod conducted in Salt Lake City, on 22 January 1865, was the city's first Protestant religious service. McLeod delivered a strong anti-Mormon message in his sermons, attracting large audiences. Soon a congregation was formally organized. At first, services were held in rented space and at Fort Douglas (where McLeod was the military chaplain), but by mid-February the congregation was actively planning to construct a church building of its own. The building project was aided by donations by supporters in Northern California. The church's first permanent home, named Independence Hall, was an adobe building at Third South, west of Main, built at a cost of $5000 and designed to seat 200 people. The church moved into Independence Hall and began holding services there in November 1865.

=== Setback in 1866 and thereafter ===
In March 1866, McLeod traveled to the eastern United States to raise money for the Utah ministry. He also delivered anti-Mormon lectures and testified before a congressional committee. In October 1866, while McLeod was on his trip back to Utah, Dr. J. King Robinson, a physician who was superintendent of the Sunday school that McLeod had started, was murdered in Salt Lake City under circumstances that caused the murder to be characterized as an "assassination". After learning of Robinson's death, McLeod decided not to return to Utah immediately. He did not get back to the territory until 1872. During McLeod's prolonged absence, the Congregational church became inactive.

=== Involvement with public education and other non-Mormon groups ===
In its early years, Independence Hall served as a meeting place for many other non-Mormon religious and civic groups in the community. Roman Catholic religious services were held there beginning in 1866 and Episcopal services began in 1867. The Episcopalians were its principal tenants in the period of Congregational inactivity between Robinson's 1866 murder and McLeod's 1872 return. The hall was also the site of Jewish services, civic and political meetings, dances, and Masonic and Odd Fellows activities. The Congregational Chinese Sunday School and Evening School, a school that was started in 1883 to teach English and Christianity to Chinese immigrants, was based in Independence Hall for several years.

During the early history of First Congregational Church, there was no free public education in Utah Territory; the only schools in Salt Lake Valley were private schools that charged tuition fees. To help provide education for children whose families could not afford to pay for tuition, in 1878 First Congregational began sponsoring some free-tuition schools, including Pilgrim Day School on the corner of Seventh East and Fifth South. By 1883 there were 33 free-tuition schools in Utah sponsored by First Congregational or other Congregational churches. In 1890 there were 36 schools serving about 2,500 students, staffed largely by women from eastern states. The number of Congregational schools declined after 1890 due to a combination of factors, and the last such school in Utah closed in 1920.

=== New church building in 1892 ===
In 1889 the congregation decided to replace Independence Hall with a larger building that could better accommodate the growth it was experiencing. Independence Hall's location in the city's growing central business district made it advantageous to sell the property and move to a new site outside the downtown area. After Independence Hall was sold for $50,000, a new church, located at the corner of First South and Fourth East, was built for a cost of $40,000. The new church, which opened for worship in May 1892, was a gray sandstone building with Romanesque architectural elements, designed by architect Warren H. Hayes. It could hold up to 1200 people in its octagonal sanctuary, with seating for 550 on the main floor, 250 in the balcony, and an additional 400 in the adjoining Sunday school room that was separated from the sanctuary by a moveable partition.

The Chinese school that had been based in Independence Hall continued to operate in the new church building. In 1894 it was renamed the Chinese Christian Association and Evening School.

=== Foothill Drive building ===
The derelict former church on Foothill Drive in 2026

Since 2022, First Congregational Church has met at All Saints Episcopal Church.

In 1965, First Congregational moved to a new building at 2150 Foothill Drive. The congregation transferred the pipe organ from the 1892 church into the new building. Built by Farrand and Votey, it was the largest organ in Utah when it was first installed in the old church, with 45 ranks, 70 stops, and 2,745 pipes.

The congregation sold the Foothill Drive building in 2022, and began sharing a worship space with All Saints Episcopal Church.

== Denominational affiliation and membership data ==
When most American Congregational churches participated in forming the new United Church of Christ in the late 1950s, the First Congregational Church did not join them. Instead, it chose to affiliate with the National Association of Congregational Christian Churches. As of 2001, it was the only Utah church with this denominational affiliation.

The church had about 300 members as of 2001.
