= Irene Tinker =

American economist

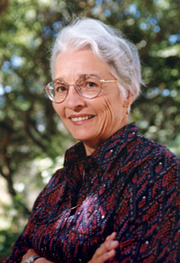
- Irene Tinker
- Born: March 8, 1927 (age 99); Milwaukee, Wisconsin, United States
- Spouse: Millidge Walker

Academic background
- Education: London School of Economics
- Influences: Ester Boserup; Margaret Mead
- Website: Official website

Irene Tinker (born March 8, 1927, in Milwaukee, Wisconsin), is professor emerita in the Departments of City and Regional Planning & Women's Studies at the University of California, Berkeley, teaching from 1989 to 1998. She was the founding Board president of the International Center for Research on Women, founder and director of the Equity Policy Center and co-founder of the Wellesley Center for Research on Women.

== Education ==
Professor Tinker earned her B.A. from Radcliffe College in political philosophy and comparative government and her PhD from the London School of Economics and Political Science in comparative government and development. Her dissertation was on India's first general elections and parliament after independence.

== Career ==
With two colleagues, she drove a Ford Anglia from London to New Delhi in 1951. In 1953, she and her new husband drove back to London from Mombasa, Kenya, in an Austin A40. Her travelogue became a book, Crossing Centuries, published in 2010.

Tinker was appointed a United States delegate to the United Nations Commission on the Status of Women in 1973. President Jimmy Carter appointed her assistant director of action in 1977. She was a Fulbright Scholar in Nepal and Sri Lanka from 1987 through 1989.

In 1977, Tinker became an associate of the Women's Institute for Freedom of the Press (WIFP).

Prior to UC Berkeley, she served on the faculties of Howard University, Federal City College/University of the District of Columbia, University of Maryland, and American University. As director of the international office of the American Association for the Advancement of Science, she convened a seminar on women and international development in Mexico City in 1975 prior to the first UN International Conference on Women.

== Personal life ==
Tinker married Millidge Walker in 1952, with whom she has three children and five grandchildren.

== Selected publications ==
=== Books ===
- Tinker, Irene; Park, Richard L. (1960). Indian political leadership: attitudes and institutions. Oxford, UK: Oxford University Press.
- Tinker, Irene (1968). Indian political leadership: attitudes and institutions. VA: Research Analysis Corporation (RAC) Strategic Studies Dept.
- Tinker, Irene; Bramsen, Michèle Bo (June 1976). Women and world development (1st ed.). Washington DC: Overseas Development Council. ISBN 9780686295365.
- Tinker, Irene; Bramsen, Michèle Bo; Buvinić, Mayra (1976). Women and world development: with an annotated bibliography. New York: Praeger. ISBN 9780275565206.
- Tinker, Irene (1990). Persistent inequalities: women and world development. New York: Oxford University Press. ISBN 9780195061581.
- Tinker, Irene; Blumberg, Rae L.; Rakowski, Cathy A.; Monteón, Michael (1995). Engendering wealth and well-being: empowerment for global change. Boulder: Westview Press. ISBN 9780813321073.
- Tinker, Irene (1997). Street foods urban food and employment in developing countries. New York: Oxford University Press. ISBN 9780195104356.
- Tinker, Irene; Summerfield, Gale (1999). Women's rights to house and land: China, Laos, Vietnam. Boulder, Colorado: Lynne Rienner Publishers. ISBN 9781555878177.
- Tinker, Irene; Fraser, Arvonne (2004). Developing power: how women transformed international development. New York: Feminist Press at the City University of New York. ISBN 9781558614840.
- Tinker, Irene (2010). Crossing centuries: a road trip through colonial Africa. Portland, Oregon: Inkwater Press. ISBN 9781592994717.
- Tinker, Irene (2016). Visioning an Equitable World: Reflections On women, Democracy, Education, and Economic Development. Portland, Oregon: Inkwater Press. ISBN 9781629013206.

=== Chapters in books ===
- Tinker, Irene (2004), "Utilizing interdisciplinarity to analyze global socio-economic change: a tribute to Ester Boserup", in Benería, Lourdes; Bisnath, Savitri (eds.), Global tensions: challenges and opportunities in the world economy, New York: Routledge, pp. 173–184, ISBN 9780415934411

=== Journal articles ===
- Tinker, Irene (November 2004). "Quotas for women in elected legislatures: Do they really empower women?". Women's Studies International Forum. 27 (5): 531–546. doi:10.1016/j.wsif.2004.09.008.

=== Collection of papers ===
- "Irene Tinker Collection, 1936-2004 - University of Illinois Archives" (Boxed collection of papers/correspondence: 93 cubic feet - stored off-site, prior notification required). Illinois: University of Illinois Archives. 1975–1990. "Description: ... materials collected by Irene Tinker, a professor and researcher on world development and the impact of development on women and men..." Pdf list of material in collection.
- "Irene Tinker Papers" (25 boxes containing a collection of papers/correspondence: 36.5 linear feet - open to the public upon request). Washington D.C.: University Library, American University. "Scope and Content Note: ...The bulk of this collection is comprised of materials relating to international development and especially the role of women and non-governmental organizations..." Scroll down for full list of contents.

== See also ==
- Feminist economics
- List of feminist economists
