= Al's Breakfast =

Breakfast restaurant in Minneapolis, Minnesota, United States

Coordinates: 44.9810272°N 93.2355288°W

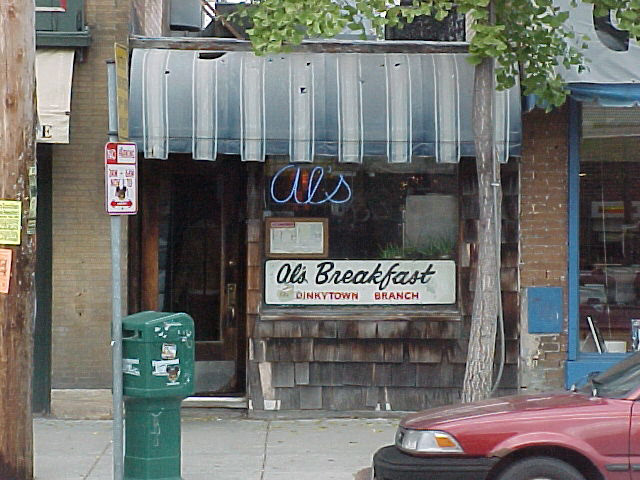
The front of Al's Breakfast

Al's Breakfast is reportedly the narrowest restaurant in the city of Minneapolis, at a width of ten feet (3.0 m). Al's Breakfast is crammed into a former alleyway between two much larger buildings and is located in the city's Dinkytown neighborhood near the University of Minnesota. The restaurant's 14 stools have seated generations of local students, along with notable figures such as writer James Lileks and humorist Garrison Keillor, all of whom consider the tiny diner to be a significant icon of the state.

== History ==
The restaurant as it is today came into being in 1950 when Al Bergstrom parted ways with another neighborhood restaurateur. Bergstrom had gained experience at the griddle and in kitchen management in the 1940s while working at the popular Jack Robinson's Cafeteria during summers at the Minnesota State Fair. The Dinkytown building he purchased dates back to 1937 when a neighboring hardware store erected a shed in the alleyway to hold sheet metal and plumbing parts. This was eventually rented out and was a Hunky Dory hamburger stand by the time Bergstrom took it over. The new owner renamed the diner to Al's Café and first opened the doors on May 15. Initially, he produced three meals a day, seven days a week, but scaled back the operation to simply be a breakfast outlet after one year.

Bergstrom retired and passed the restaurant to his nephew Phil Bergstrom in 1973–1974. Doug Grina and Jim Brandes eventually took over around 1980. In 2016 Jim Brandes' ownership stake in the restaurant was purchased by the long reigning "Queen of the Weekend" Alison Kirwin. Al Bergstrom died at his residence in Forest Lake, Minnesota in 2003, at the age of 97, but the recipes and short-order cooking style that he developed continue to be used at his namesake restaurant.

== The restaurant ==
Due to the tiny space, guests must first stand in line along the building's back wall as they wait for others to finish their meals. It is common for diners to be instructed to move down the counter to allow newly seated customers to be seated together. Veterans of Al's are used to the instruction and diners may be re-seated several times during the course of a meal.

Frequent customers can purchase "meal books" and pre-pay for their food. This practice dates back to the 1950s, when Al Bergstrom would accept prepayment from railroad workers that were only paid once a month. Hundreds of such books line the opposite wall, where two griddles are also situated.

A number of unusual trinkets line the front area of the diner. The stools and a linoleum countertop run down the middle of the building. Specialties on the menu include buttermilk pancakes, bacon waffles, hash browns, and eggs prepared in a number of different styles including omelettes. There are also some seasonal items and weekend specials. The restaurant may be rented out for private parties.

== Awards and popular mention ==
A University of Minnesota music professor, David Baldwin, composed special tunes in celebration of the restaurant's 50th anniversary in 2000. These were played in front of the building on May 15 by a local brass band.

In 2004, Al's Breakfast won a James Beard Foundation award in the "America's Classics Restaurants" category. The award medal now hangs behind the counter at Al's.

In 2007, Laurie Lindeen, Minneapolis author, wife of ex-Replacements member Paul Westerberg, and former bandleader of Zuzu's Petals, chronicles several years of working at the "Hi-Lo Diner," described in her book Petal Pusher as a "famous fourteen-stool breakfast joint" near the U of M campus that has narrow walls "covered in grease-preserved foreign money." The description is a clear reference to Al's Breakfast.

Al's Breakfast has appeared three times on the Food Network's Diners, Drive-Ins and Dives in 2007, 2010, and 2014.
