= Warren H. Hayes =

American architect

Warren Howard Hayes
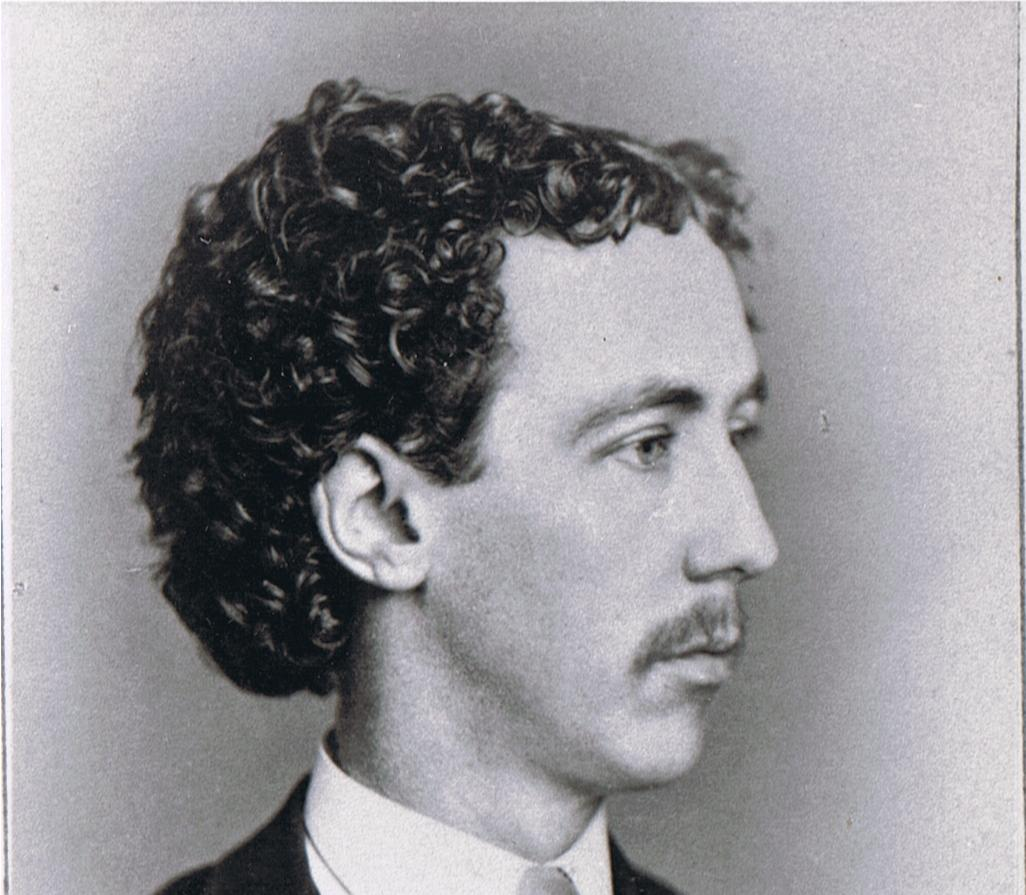
- W.H. Hayes, Cornell 1871
- Born: August 22, 1847; Prattsburgh, New York
- Died: 1899
- Occupation: Architect
- Buildings: Fowler Methodist Episcopal Church, Central Presbyterian Church (St. Paul, Minnesota), Lodi Methodist Church, Wesley United Methodist Church (Minneapolis, Minnesota), First Presbyterian Church (Hastings, Minnesota)

Warren Howard Hayes (1847–1899) was a leading designer of churches in the United States and Canada during the late 19th century. Hayes' work holds a significant place in its association with the "Social Gospel" movement. He is credited with some of the earliest use of the "diagonal auditorium" plan and the vast majority of his churches uncovered to date are centered on the diagonal auditorium design with fan shaped pew arrangements and, to assure excellent acoustics, the seating sloping toward the pulpit and domed ceilings. As noted at the opening of the Rockville Ct. Congregational Church:

The acoustic properties of the auditorium are something wonderful. The pastor says he never before spoke in church or hall which can compare with it in this respect. There are yet to be added a protected desk light for the pulpit and a shaded reflector for the organ. The seating capacity of the auditorium is 600, of the gallery 300, of the chapel 300. This capacity can be extended by placing chairs in vacant spaces without obstructing any aisles from 100 to 200 more. —Warren H. Hayes of Minneapolis.

Often the interiors have Arts and Crafts movement attributes, and some of the congregations accepted Hayes recommendations of Louis Tiffany for their stained glass.

From early in his career Hayes worked closely with artists-decorators, such as Lawrence A. McIvor, who worked for Hayes in Elmira, and later followed him to Minneapolis where he worked as the L.A. McIvor & Company. While attentive to the look and sounds of his churches, Hayes also was an early adopter of advanced mechanical and electrical systems.

The National Register of Historic Places currently includes seven of his works in Minnesota and the Methodist Episcopal Church at Lodi, New York.

Hayes was deeply involved in the institutional church movement throughout his career, and although he was a Methodist, he had extensive ties with other denominations. This is well illustrated in the nationwide dissemination by various church organizations charged with promoting church building and development of his ideas and plans in the late 19th century.

== Life ==
The National Cyclopaedia of American Biography included a lengthy entry about Hayes, together with some family background, five years before his death:

On his father's side he is of New England stock, being descended from George Hayes, of Windsor, Connecticut, who emigrated from Scotland to Derbyshire, England, and thence to Windsor, Connecticut, in 1680, where descendants of the family still live. Many honored names represent the family in professional and official life, 19th President of the United States Rutherford Hayes being among the number. Upon his mother's" side, Mr. Hayes' progenitors are the Robsons and Straughans, of Northumberland, England, who emigrated to Geneva in Ontario, early in the nineteenth century. The boyhood of Mr. Hayes was spent on the farm of his father, George Goundry Hayes, who was at that time one of the most successful agriculturists in that section, owning and tilling large farms in Yates, Steuben, and Ontario. The son's studies were begun at the age of five in the district school, and continued for seven years. This was supplemented at the select school in Italy, New York, at Watkins' Academy, and at Genesee Wesleyan Seminary at Lima, New York.

In 1868 Hayes entered the sophomore class of Cornell University, and was graduated in 1871, having successfully taken the courses in architecture and civil engineering, including the natural sciences and modern languages. He also, during his college course, took two President Andrew Dickson White, who was the founder of the Department of History and Political Science, first prizes for proficiency in mechanics and physics. The succeeding ten years were given to the successful practice of his chosen profession, architecture, at Elmira, New York, where, in May 1881, he was united in marriage to Miss M. F. Beardsley. In September 1881, he opened an office in Minneapolis, Minnesota, where from that time to 1894, he has maintained a widely extended and successful practice. Many of the finer business and public buildings in Minneapolis and St. Paul have been erected by him, as well as notable structures in other cities. Hayes shows especial originality in ecclesiastical architecture. Among the churches which he has designed are the First Congregational Church at Rockland, Massachusetts, the Union Congregational Church at Rockville, Connecticut, the First Baptist Church at Portland, Oregon, and the Wesley Methodist Episcopal Church in Minneapolis, Minnesota.

Hayes would erect the Fowler Methodist Episcopal Church, named for Bishop C. II. Fowler and now known as the Scottish Rite Temple. All the above buildings, and many similar ones, notably the Central Presbyterian Church of St. Paul, Minnesota, and the First Presbyterian Church of Galesburg, Illinois, are planned on Hayes' original "diagonal plan" of auditorium, developed by him in the winter of 1882, and first used in several leading churches in Minneapolis. Its beauty and success were popular from the beginning. It was designed to account for acoustics, facilities for sight, ventilation, light, access, and ease of combination with the chapel. The diagonal auditorium brought him great credit and enduring fame. On October 26, 1886, Hayes was married to Mrs. Lillie Cook Van Norman, of Hamilton, Ontario, his first wife and daughter having died four years previous. From this second marriage three children were born to them: Edith, George Edson, and Helen, who, with Mary Van Norman, the stepdaughter, form the present family. [mention of his daughter Alice Grace Hayes (Smith) unfortunately was omitted].

An article at the time of his untimely death in 1899 from pernicious anemia noted:

Warren Howard Hayes was born at Prattsburgh, Steuben County, New York, Aug 22, 1847. His boyhood was spent on the farm of his father, [George Goudry Hayes], who was at that time one of the most successful agriculturists in that section. Mr Hayes received his earlier education in the select school of Italy, N.Y., at Watkin's Academy, and at Genesee Wesleyan Seminary of Lima, N.Y. In 1868 he entered the sophomore class of Cornell University and was graduated in 1871, having successfully taken the courses in architecture and civil engineering, including the natural sciences and modern languages. The succeeding ten years of his life Mr. Hayes devoted to the successful practice of his chosen profession at Elmira, N.Y. In 1881 he removed to Minneapolis.

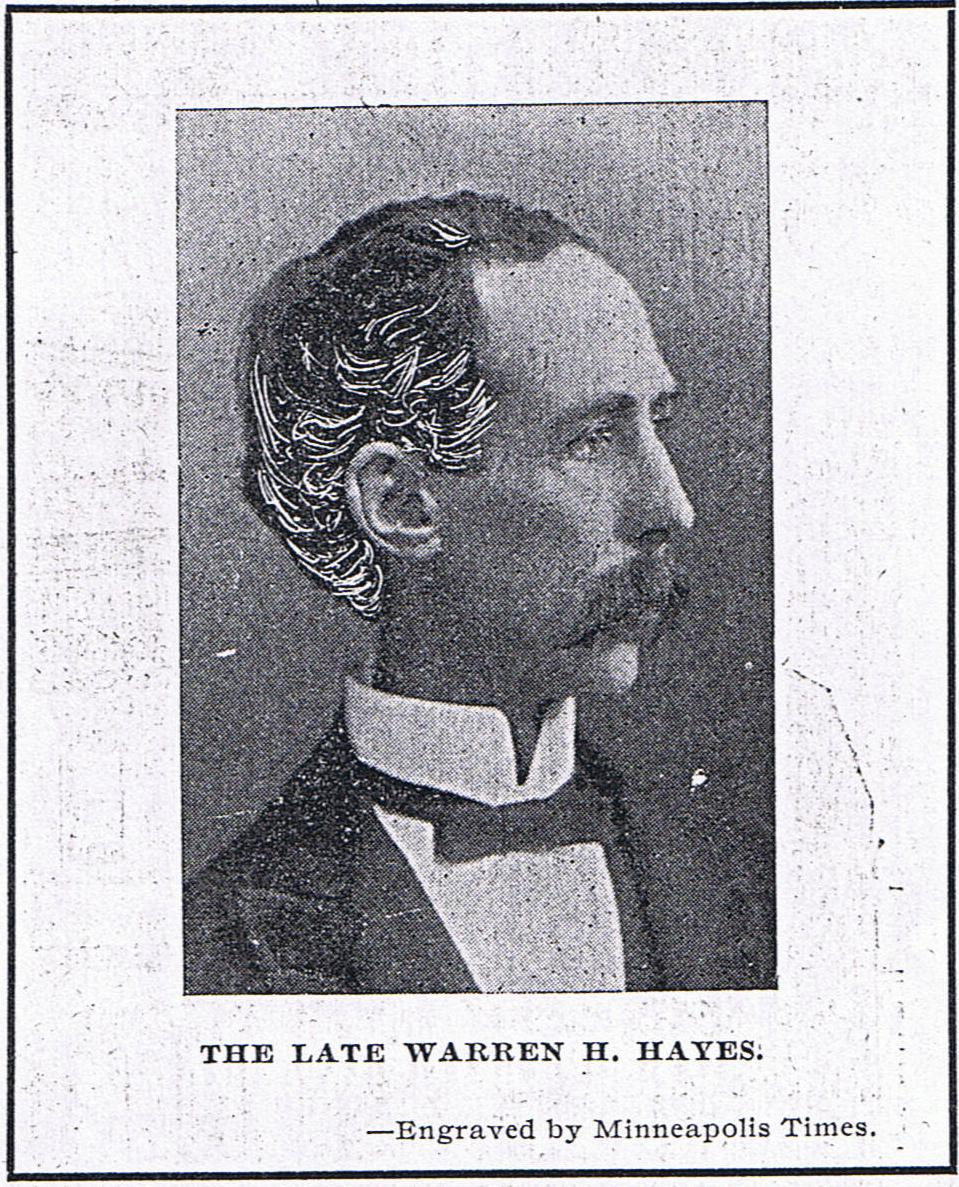

Mr. Hayes' specialty was church designing and his work and fame in that line are by no means local. Churches have been built in all parts of the United States and Canada from his plans and one at Pekin, China. About his last work was in connection with the new Westminster church in Minneapolis. Among the larger churches designed by him are the following: Wesley Methodist, Fowler Methodist, First Methodist, First Congregational, Central, Calvary and Immanuel Baptist, First Presbyterian, Swedish Tabernacle in Minneapolis' the Central Presbyterian, St. Paul' First Baptist, Portland Ore' Presbyterian churches at Mankato, Minn., Madison, Wis., Ashland, Wis., Oshkosh, Wis., Baraboo, Wis. While devoting his attention especially to churches, Mr Hayes did considerable notable work in other lines. The Hugh Harrison wholesale building, First Avenue North and Third Street, the North Star Shoe Company building and the Sykes block are other Minneapolis monuments to his taste and ability as an architect.

— The Improvement Bulletin, Sept. 2, 1899

After Hayes' death his architectural business was purchased by Frederick H. Heath, who began his architectural studies in Hayes office and who worked as a draftsman and designer for Hayes for ten years. Heath designed hundreds of buildings in the Tacoma, Washington area.

== Church architecture ==
In 1997, Ronald Ramsay, then Associate Professor at North Dakota State University, visited the Presbyterian Historical Society and studied various annual reports of the Board of Church Erection for the Presbyterian Church U.S.A. and reported a list of Hayes designs to the Hayes Research Project that included nine designs and renderings by Warren H. Hayes, as follows:

Eighth Annual Report (1878)

- "Rural Chapel"
- Design #4. pp. 21–23.
- Design #5. pp. 23–24.
- "First ... Church", Walla Walla, W.T.
- Design #6. pp. 23–26.

Fourteenth Annual Report (1884)

- Untitled
- Untitled
- Untitled
- Untitled

Twenty-first Annual Report (1891)

- "Le Mars", Iowa

Often these Hayes' designs were accompanied by a note ("Plans, detailed drawing, specifications, and form of contract all complete, ready to be sent, by mail, on receipt of $5.00") Hayes also advertised in the Presbyterian "Assembly Herald".

Hayes had an extensive relationship with the Congregational Church Building Society, the American Congregational Union. His advertisements appeared frequently in its Church Building Quarterly and on occasions there appear announcements regarding various churches Hayes' had designed. St. Louis Compton Hill Congregational Church Morning Sun Iowa Congregational Church; Plymouth Congregational Church, Oshkosh, Wisc.; Eagle Grove Iowa Congregational Church; First Congregational Church in Salt Lake City, Utah; Wausau, Wisc. As noted by Jeanne Halgren Kilde in her book When Church Became Theater: The Transformation of Evangelical Architecture ... (2002) (p. 105) "[...] Hayes [...] gained the imprimatur of the National Council of Congregational Churches during the 1890s when he was the architect most often featured in the Congregational Yearbook."

Similarly, Hayes advertised in the Baptist Home Monthly, and had many commissions for Baptist churches. Sommerville, Mass. Union Baptist Church

The Methodist Church likewise published Church Plan catalogs

In effect these church building societies were putting together "plan books" or plan exemplars and sending them to their members on a regular basis. While Hayes is best known for some of the larger churches he designed, many of the participants in these building societies were small churches, which logically gravitated to such 'off the shelf design'.

Often local architects would use these plan book designs, or would be required by local ordinance, custom, or oversight duties to adopt the plans as their own.

An example of this approach is the construction of the Congregational Church of St. Joseph, Missouri. While Hayes designed the church, --- as evidenced by his rendering in the October 1890 edition of the "Church + Building Quarterly" of the American Congregational Union. — all of the public filings, and the all-important architect's signature and seal were done by local St. Joseph, MO. professionals. See also Hayes advertisement including a rendering of the St. Joseph Mo Congregational Church.

This process of the use of plan books, and transmission via the mails of standard designs, together with local oversight often can cause great confusion in giving the correct attribution to a particular church. This appears especially to be the case with Hayes, and it may be that literally hundreds of churches built during the 1880s and 1890s are his design. Indeed, if one finds a church 'diagonal auditorium' design of that vintage, with curved floors for better acoustics, it could well be a Hayes' church.

== Works ==
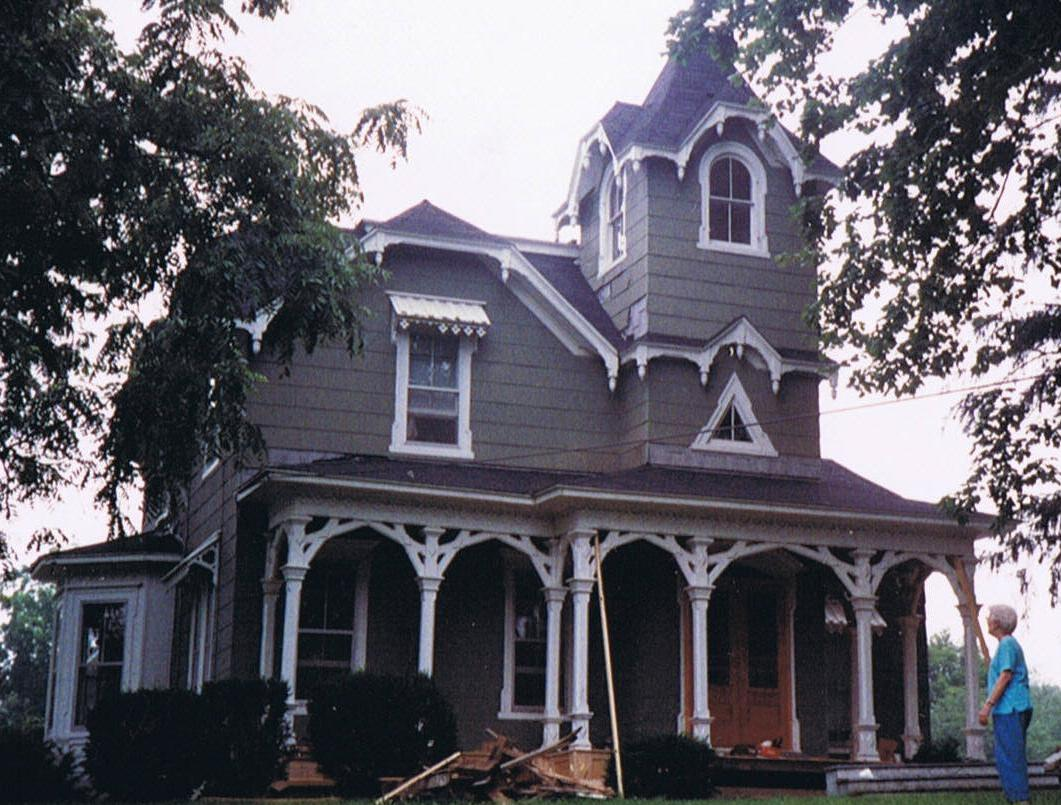
The former George Hayes home in Penn Yan, NY during its 1989 remodeling

The Methodist Episcopal Church at Lodi, New York

After graduation from Cornell, Hayes set up his office first in Penn Yan and then in 1873 in Elmira, New York. One of his earliest published designs is an 1878 English cottage that appears in the American Architect and Building News. Another example of Hayes' early residential works is his father's home built in about 1883 at 2505, County House Road, Penn Yan, NY, which is now on the National Register of Historic Places, and where inscriptions noting the design work signed by Hayes have been found.

Hayes designed his Minneapolis home at 619 12th Avenue South. The last known example of a Hayes residential commission appears in The Improvement Bulletin of June 24, 1899, which reported that Hayes had prepared plans for a 2-story frame residence to be erected by Rev. T. M Findley at Spicer, Minnesota.

Hayes' first known church commission was the First Methodist Church of Watkins Glen, at 127 E. 4th Street, Watkins Glen, NY 140891. Noting that Hayes went from a

"private school in Italy, NY, thence two years at Watkins Academy, here, in 1865, joining on probation the First M.E. Church, (whose present fine edifice erected in later years was from his first church design) ..."

This was no doubt due to his close ties to the community. Hayes' uncle, Daniel Howard, was the President of the Board of Trustees. The church also has a stained glass window in memory of Daniel A. and Hannah Howard.

Other churches designed while at Elmira include the Methodist Episcopal Church at Lodi, New York, featured on the cover of the July 29, 1882 edition of the American Architect and Building News (No 344), and now on the National Register of Historic Places.

In Minneapolis, Hayes designed the Calvary Baptist Church, the Fowler Methodist Episcopal Church (in 1906 the original sanctuary was converted into a Chapel as part of a substantial church expansion designed by Harry Wild Jones, which retained the Sunday school rooms which are now part of the 'Red Room' of the Scottish Rite Temple, which has the original plans, with copies at the Northwest Architectural Archives), the First Congregational Church, and the Wesley Methodist Episcopal Church.

Works in Minneapolis, Minnesota

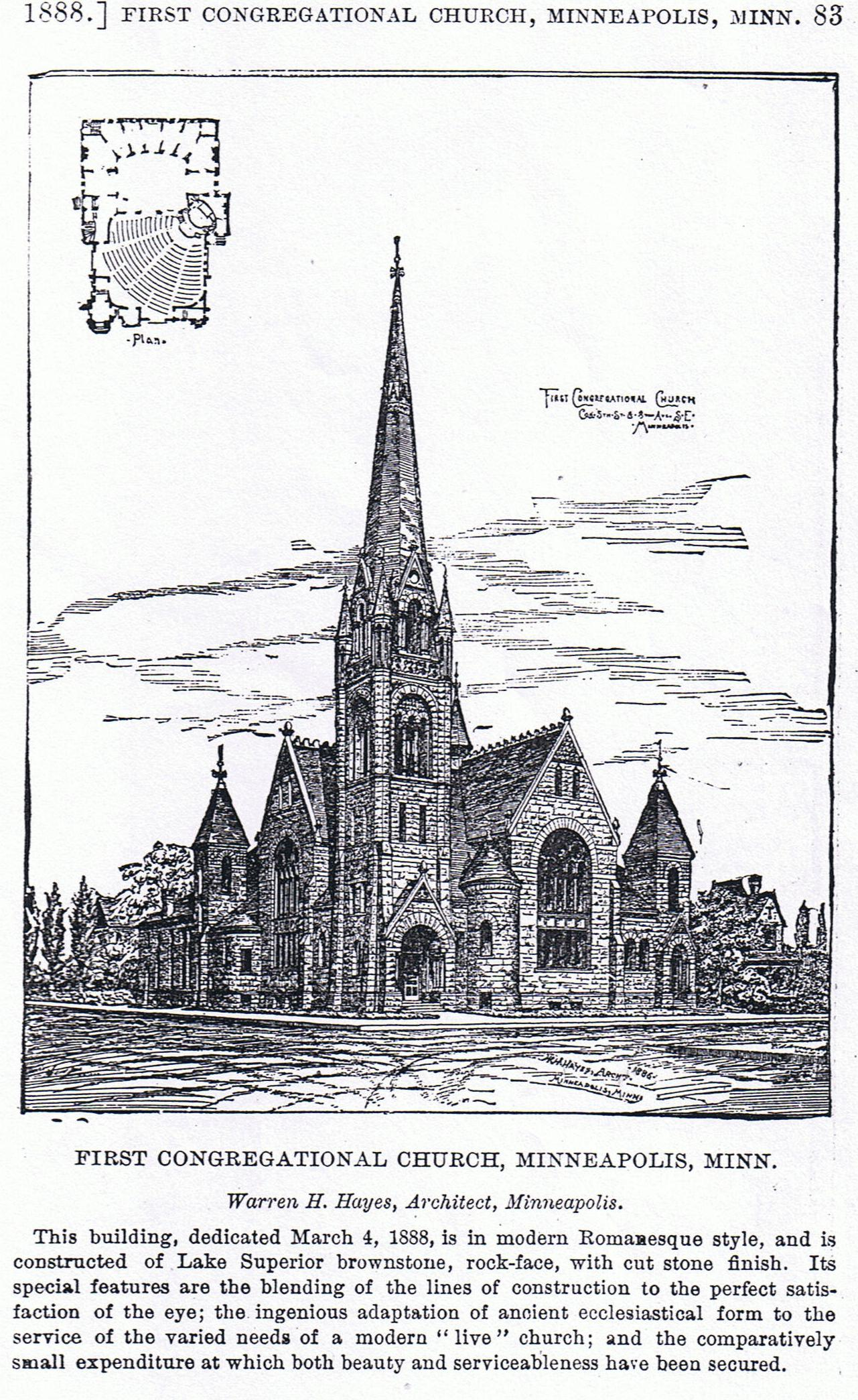
First Congregational Church

Interior plan for the First Congregational Church

Wesley United Methodist Church

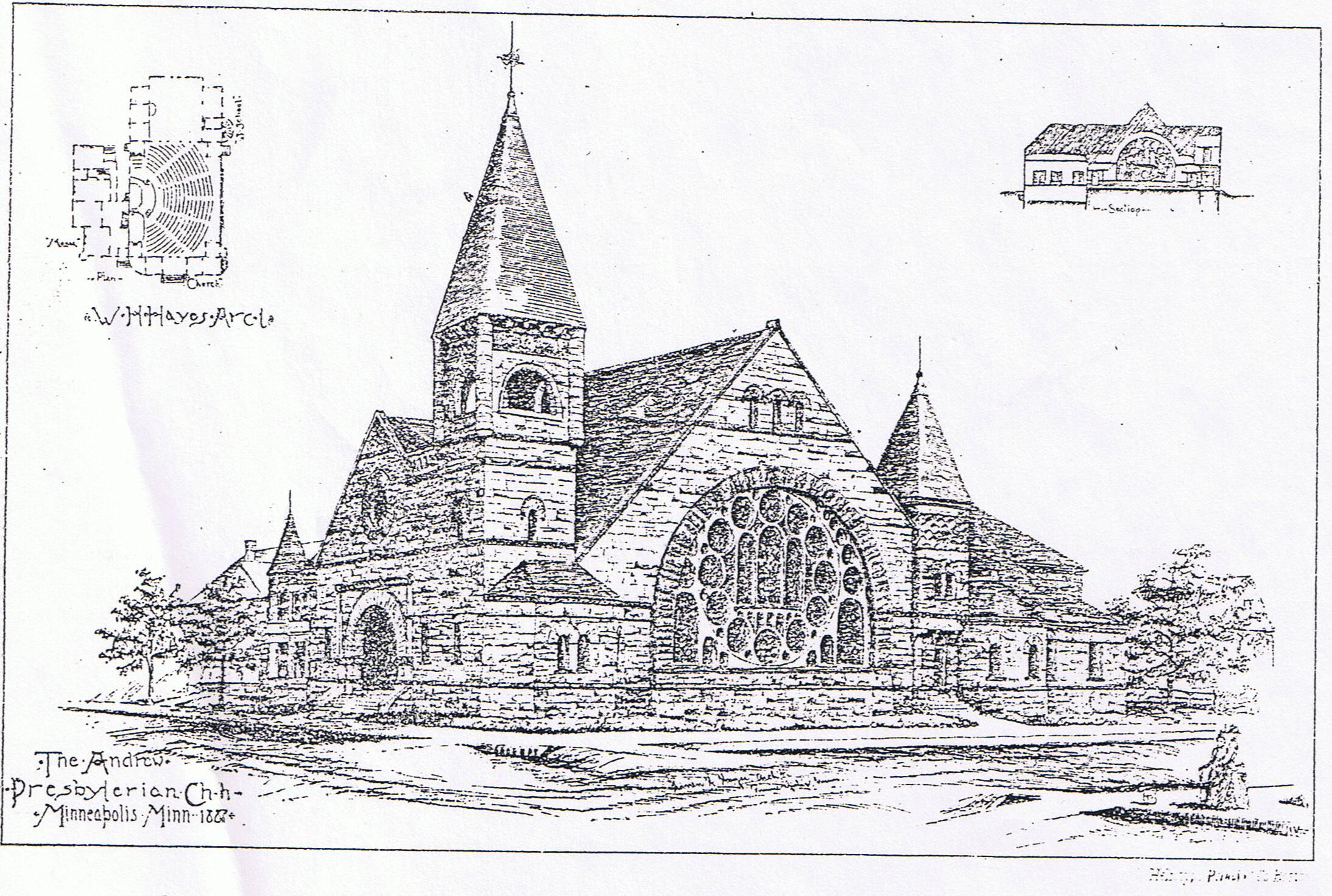
Andrew Presbyterian Church

Elsewhere in Minnesota, Hayes designed the Central Presbyterian Church in Saint Paul.

Hayes' design of a Church for the First Methodist Church Society of Beijing, China, with seating capacity for 2000, was almost as large as his Wesley Methodist Church.

Hayes is credited for plans for two churches in Canada including St. Andrew’s United Church (originally Presbyterian) in Nanaimo, British Columbia c . 1893.

Other churches

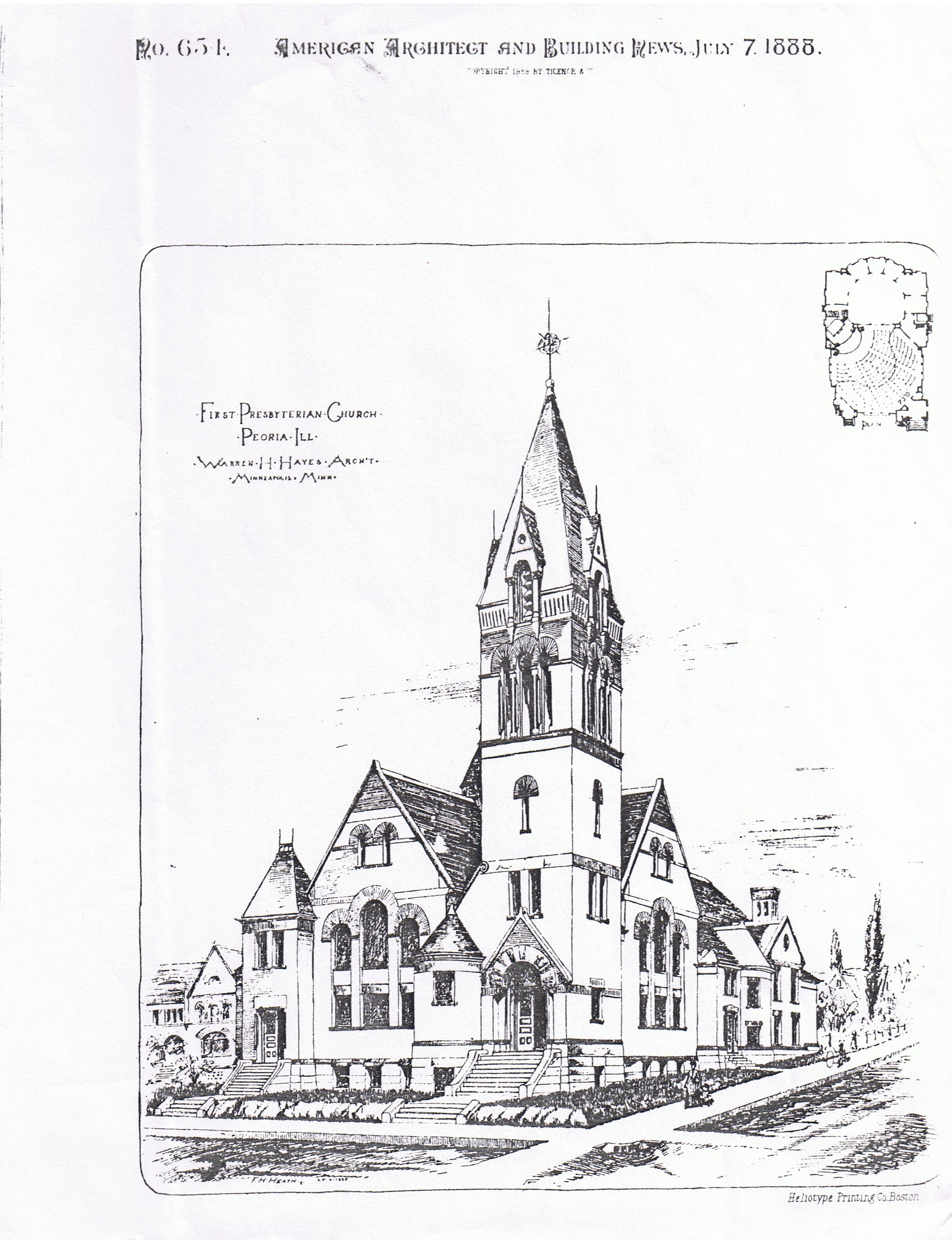
First Presbyterian Church in Peoria, Illinois (1888)

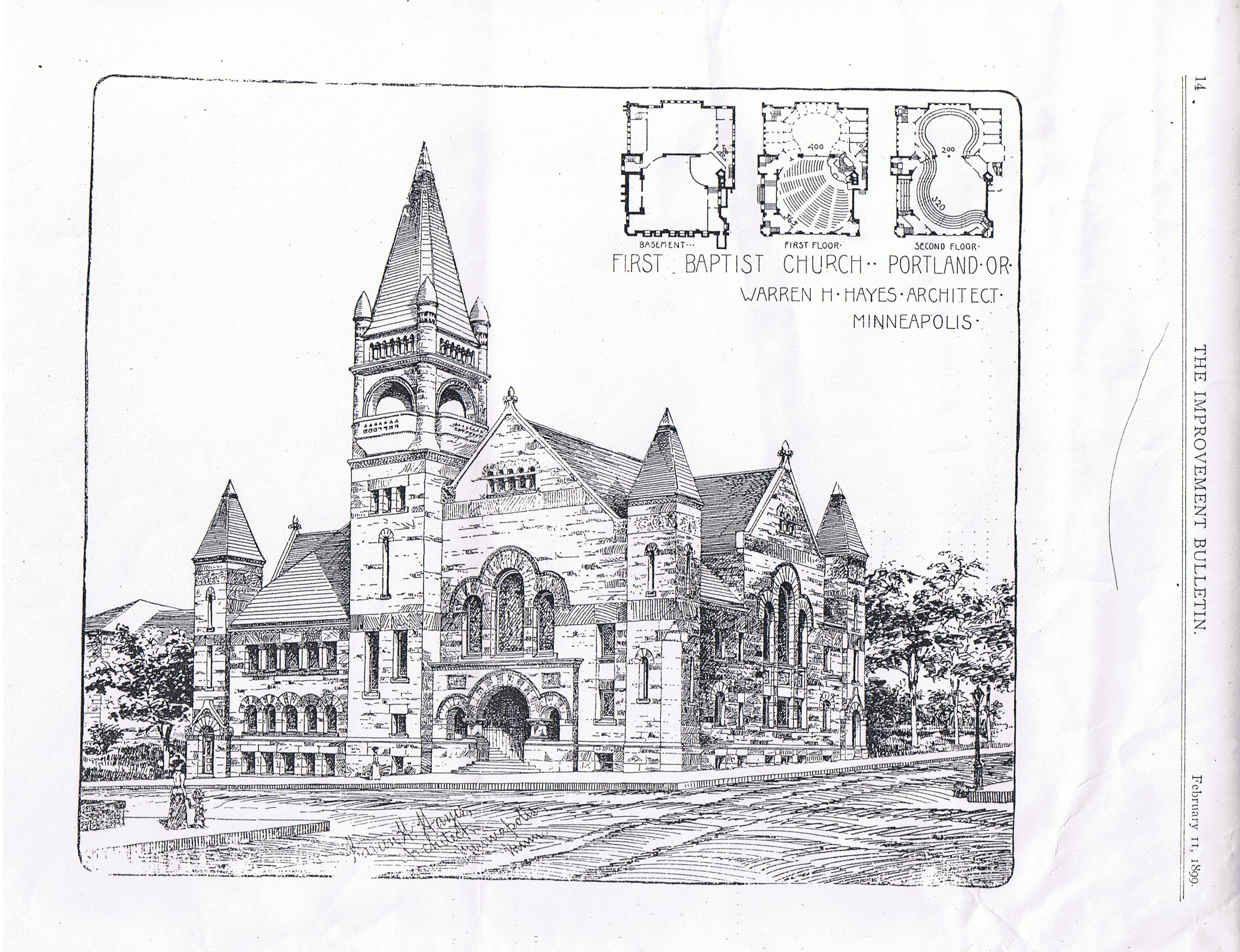
First Baptist Church in Portland, Oregon (1899)

First Congregational Church in Appleton, Wisconsin

Hayes also prepared designs for institutions and developers. Examples include the Science Hall at Hamline University, University Hall-Old Main at Hamline University, Ladies Hall at Lawrence University in Appleton, Wisconsin, and the Music Building at the University of Minnesota.

Examples of his furniture designs also still exist, such as an octagonal table inscribed "Designed and Built for Warren H Hayes, Architect, 1893" and signed by Hayes.

Other works

Hamline University Hall of Science in St. Paul, Minnesota

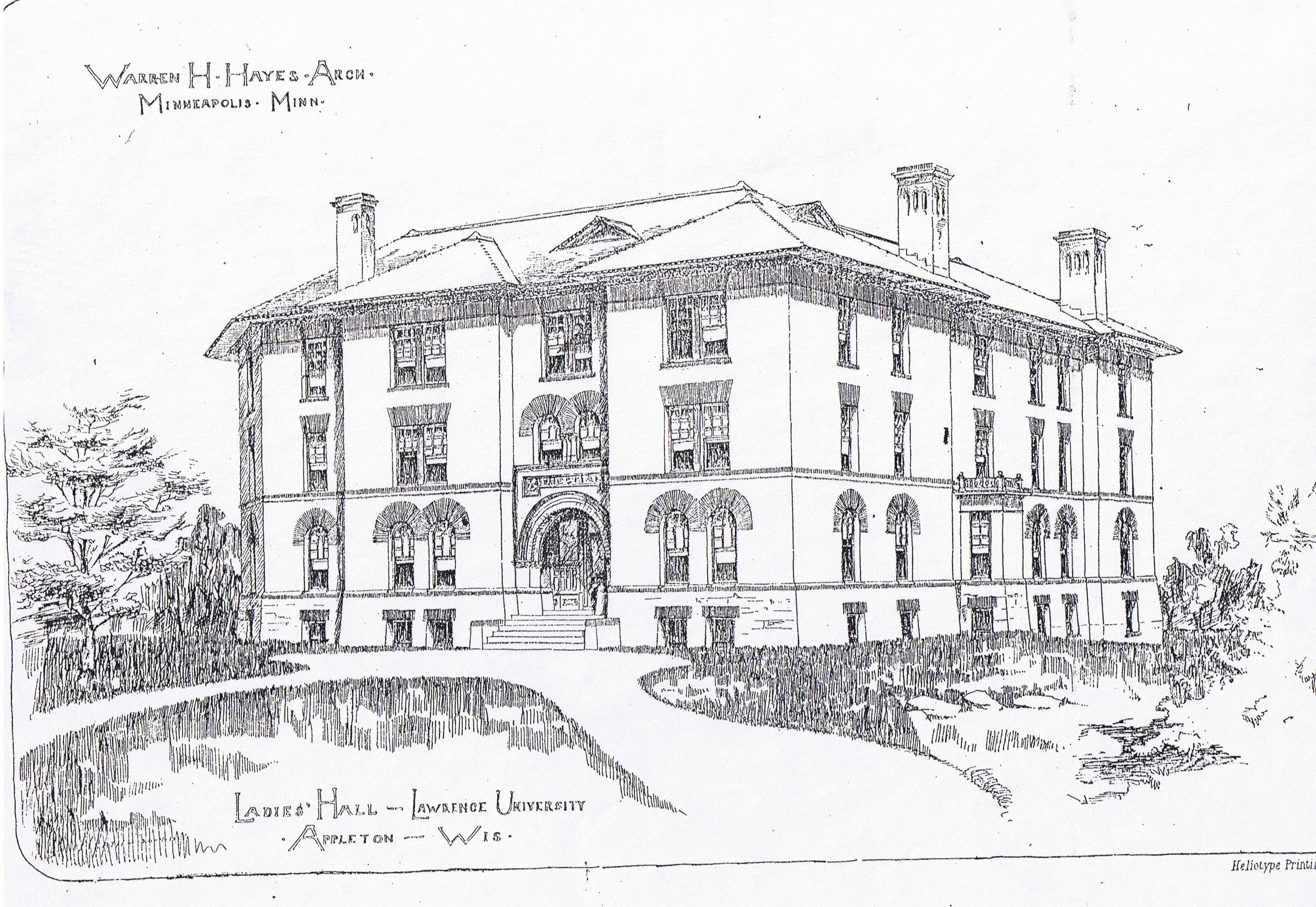
Lawrence University Ladies Hall in Appleton, Wisconsin

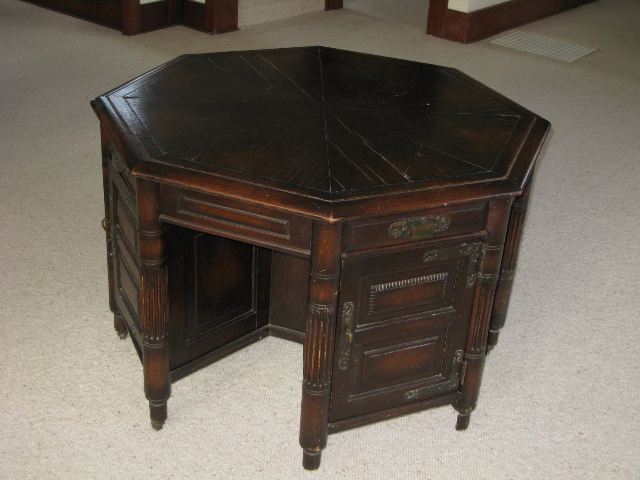
Octagonal table (1893)

== Publications ==
Numerous elevation and plan view renderings by Hayes appeared in professional and trade journals of the 1880s and 1890s, for example:

Publication	Date	Location	Building
American Architect and Building News	July 29, 1882	Lodi, New York	Methodist Episcopal Church
American Architect and Building News	1887	Minneapolis, Minn	The Andrew Presbyterian Church
American Architect and Building News	1887	Appleton, Wisconsin	First Congregational Church
American Architect and Building News	July 7, 1888	Peoria, Illinois	First Presbyterian Church
American Architect and Building News	May 7, 1892	Oconto, Wisconsin	First Presbyterian Church
American Architect and Building News	May 7, 1892	Minneapolis, Minnesota	Immanuel Baptist Church
The Improvement Bulletin	Feb 11, 1899	Portland, Oregon	First Baptist Church

The Improvement Bulletin also noted the following works by Hayes:

- April 1, 1899 Albert Lea, Minnesota and Knoxville, Illinois "It will be 60X90, with high tower in one corner, of pressed brick veneer and cut stone trimmings, galvanized iron work, slate roof, leaded glass, decorating, church pews, and furnaces for heating"
- April 8, 1899 Knoxville, Illinois plans have been accepted by the Presbyterian church
- April 29, 1899 Audubon, Iowa Presbyterian Church
- June 3, 1899 Presbyterian Church in Worthington, Minnesota, and Baptist church in Eldora, Iowa
- June 17, 1899, First Methodist Episcopal church at Baraboo, Wisconsin.
