= Marcy-Holmes, Minneapolis =

Coordinates: 44.9841°N 93.2481°W

Marcy-Holmes
- Neighborhood
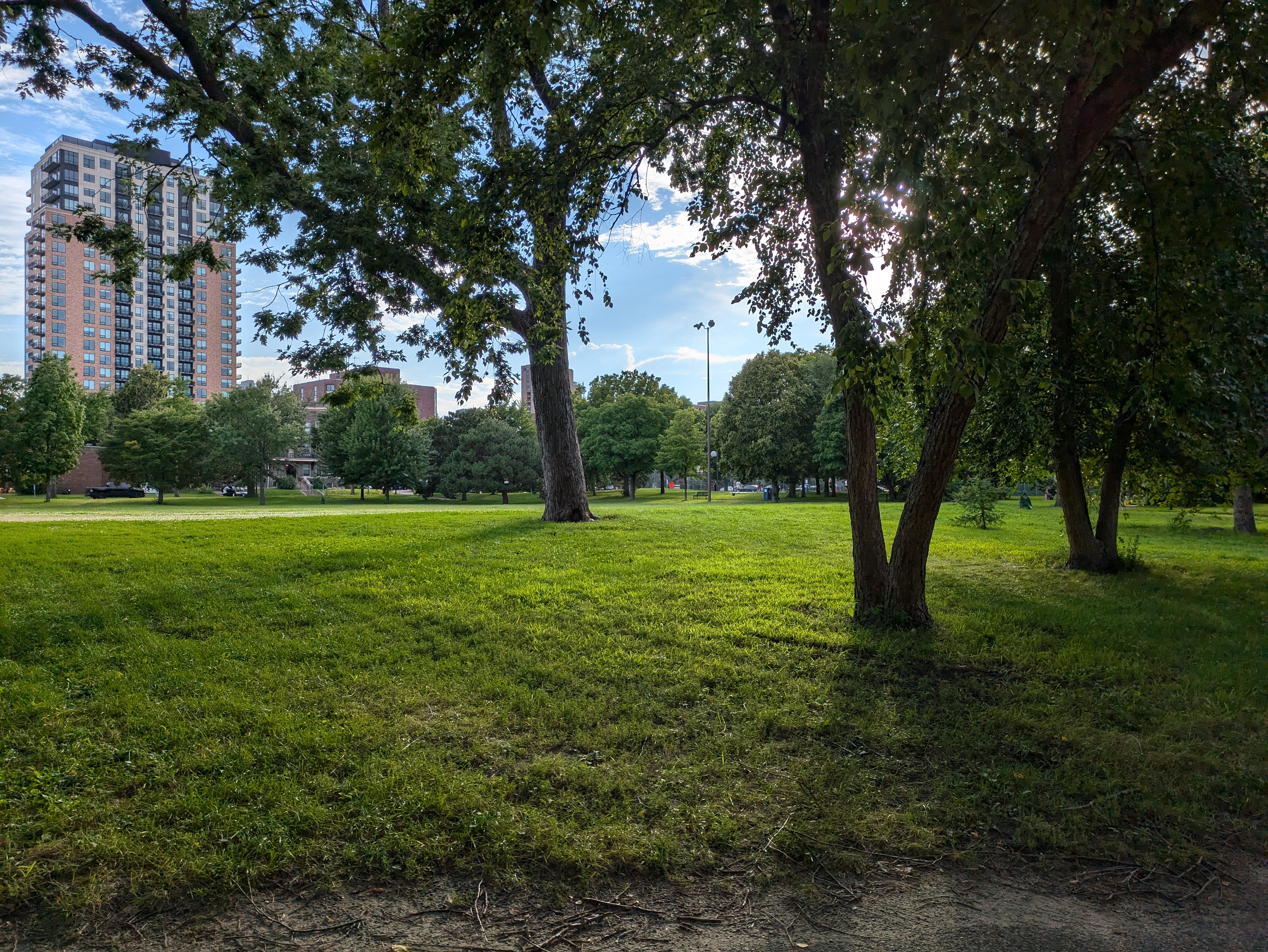
- Holmes Park

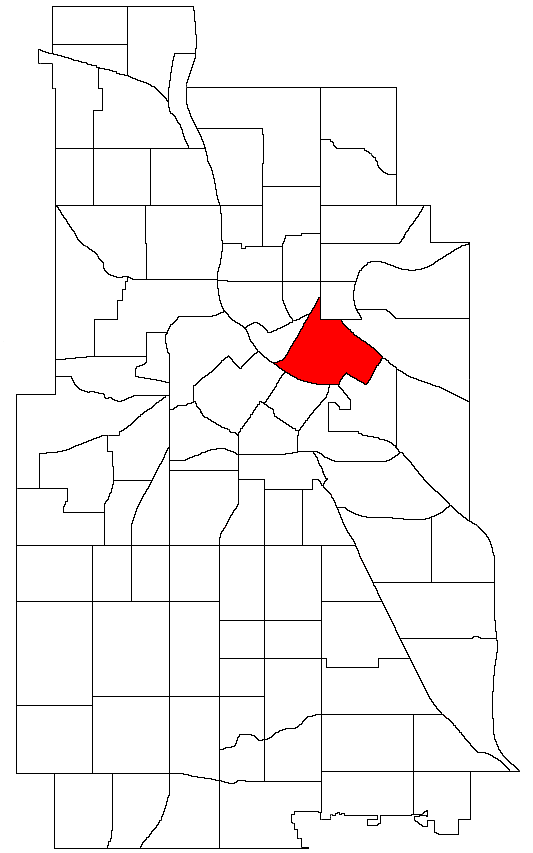
- Location of Marcy-Holmes within the U.S. city of Minneapolis
- Interactive map of Marcy-Holmes
- Country: United States
- State: Minnesota
- County: Hennepin
- City: Minneapolis
- Community: University
- Established: 1849
- City Council Wards: 2,3

Government
  - Council Member, Ward 2: Robin Wonsley
  - Council Member, Ward 3: Michael Rainville

Area
  - Total: 0.825 sq mi (2.14 km^{2})

Population (2020)
  - Total: 15,141
  - Density: 18,400/sq mi (7,090/km^{2})
- Time zone: UTC-6 (CST)
  - Summer (DST): UTC-5 (CDT)
- ZIP code: 55414
- Area code: 612
- Website: http://www.marcy-holmes.org

Historical population
| Census | Pop. | Note | %± |
|---|---|---|---|
| 1980 | 8,646 | | — |
| 1990 | 8,810 | | 1.9% |
| 2000 | 9,009 | | 2.3% |
| 2010 | 10,015 | | 11.2% |
| 2020 | 15,141 | | 51.2% |

Marcy-Holmes is a neighborhood in Minneapolis's University community. Most of the area is residential and sits upon a bluff overlooking the river and the city skyline. A small section of the neighborhood along the river is an industrial zone. As of 2020, Marcy-Holmes was the most populous Minneapolis neighborhood.

The neighborhood is bordered on the south by the Mississippi River, to the east by the University of Minnesota and 15th Avenue Southeast, to the north by the railroad tracks that separate it from Como Neighborhood, and to the west by Central Avenue. Somewhat confusingly to newcomers, the Marcy-Holmes neighborhood is considered part of Southeast Minneapolis, despite its seemingly central location in the city. Almost every street and avenue within the neighborhood is labeled "SE": South of East Hennepin Avenue and East of the Mississippi River.

Most of Marcy-Holmes sits within ward 3 of the Minneapolis City Council, while the portion east of I-35W is in ward 2. It straddles state legislative districts 59B and 60B. The neighborhood is named after the former Marcy Park and Holmes Park (themselves named for William L. Marcy and Oliver Wendell Holmes Sr.), both within the neighborhood. Marcy Park was renamed Dinky Park on November 19, 2025.

Marcy-Holmes is known for its diverse community, its commercial districts of Saint Anthony Main and Dinkytown, and its immediate proximity to the East Bank of the University of Minnesota-Twin Cities campus.

== Demographics ==
In 2020, Marcy-Holmes's population was 15,149, the highest of any Minneapolis neighborhood. About 80% of residents 5 and older speak English at home. 17.4% of residents are foreign-born. Over 86% of households are renter-occupied.

Race/ethnicity
| Race/ethnicity | 1980 | | 1990 | | 2000 | | 2010 | | 2020 | |
| Race/ethnicity | Number | % | Number | % | Number | % | Number | % | Number | % |
|---|---|---|---|---|---|---|---|---|---|---|
| White alone | 7,804 | 90.26 | 7,324 | 83.13 | 6,662 | 73.95 | 7,457 | 74.46 | 10,894 | 71.91 |
| Black alone | 215 | 2.49 | 390 | 4.43 | 435 | 4.83 | 454 | 4.52 | 1,002 | 6.61 |
| Hispanic or Latino (any race) | 99 | 1.15 | 196 | 2.22 | 454 | 5.04 | 438 | 4.37 | 803 | 5.30 |
| Native American alone | 46 | 0.53 | 63 | 0.72 | 70 | 0.78 | 74 | 0.74 | 94 | 0.62 |
| Asian alone | 362 | 4.19 | 831 | 9.43 | 1,092 | 12.12 | 1,336 | 13.34 | 1,557 | 10.28 |
| Other race alone | 120 | 1.39 | 6 | 0.07 | 34 | 0.38 | 18 | 0.18 | 59 | 0.39 |
| Pacific Islander alone | —N/a | —N/a | —N/a | —N/a | 10 | 0.11 | 5 | 0.05 | 8 | 0.05 |
| Two or more races | —N/a | —N/a | —N/a | —N/a | 252 | 2.80 | 233 | 2.33 | 732 | 4.83 |
| Total | 8,646 | 100.0 | 8,810 | 100.0 | 9,009 | 100.0 | 10,015 | 100.0 | 15,149 | 100.0 |

== Landmarks ==
- B. O. Cutter House
- Marcy-Holmes Community Garden
- Stone Arch Bridge
- Sixth Avenue Gateway
- Florence Court
- Frey Mansion
- First Congregational Church

== Historic Districts ==
- Fifth Street Southeast
- St. Anthony Falls
- University of MN Greek Letter Chapter House
- Dinkytown Commercial
- St. Anthony Main commercial area

== Image gallery ==
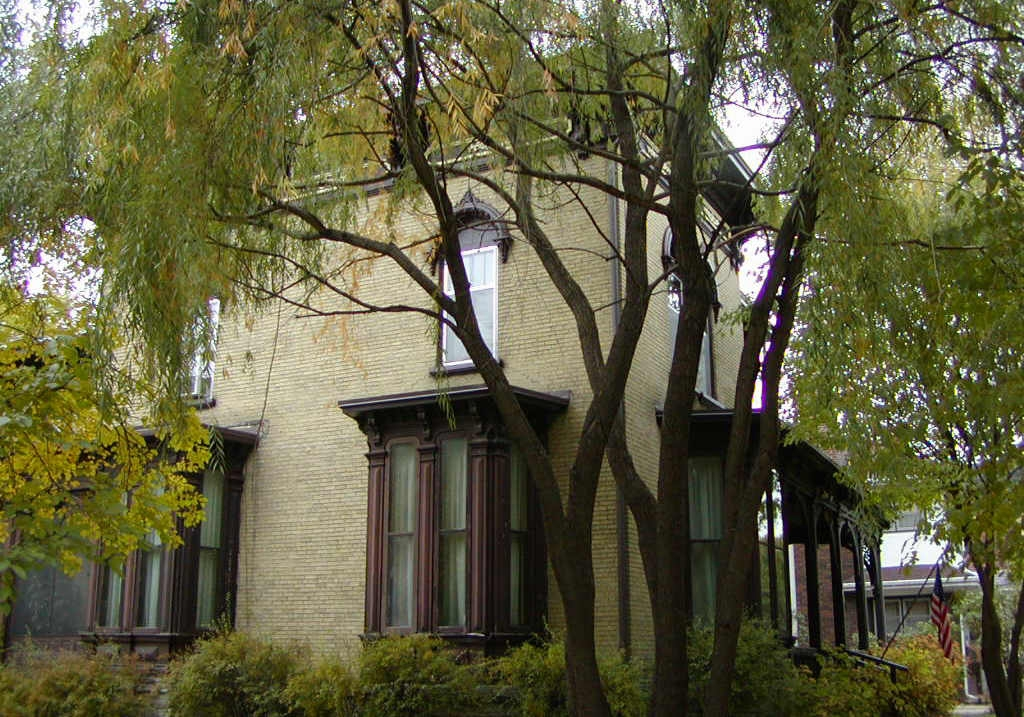
Woodbury Fisk House

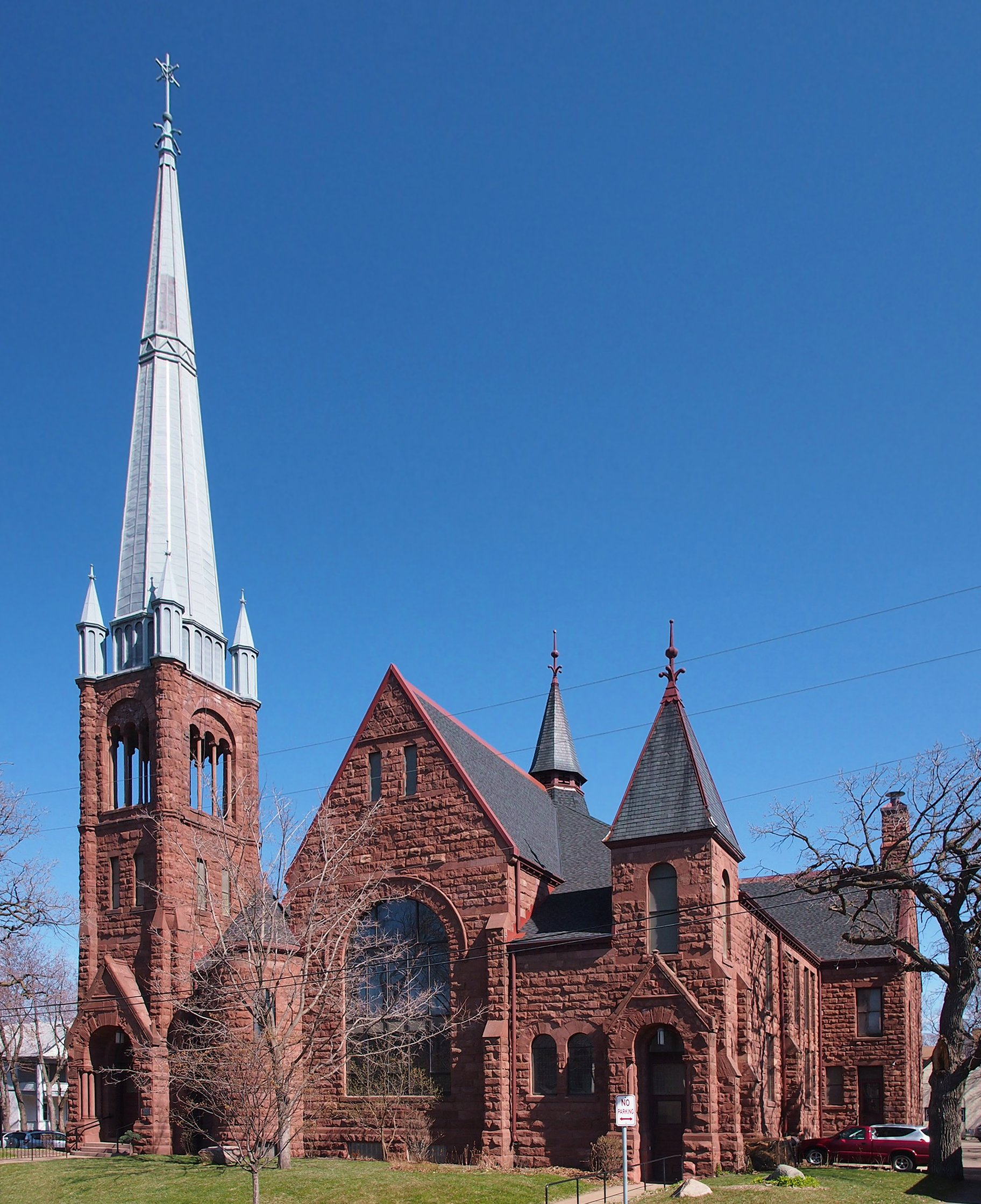
First Congregational Church

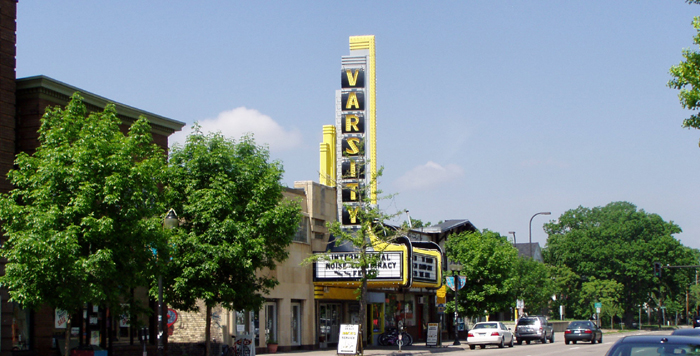
Varsity Theater

== In popular culture ==
- Marcy Open School is the namesake of the band Marcy Playground, whose lead singer attended the school.
