= Central Presbyterian Church (Saint Paul, Minnesota) =

Historic church in Minnesota, United States

- U.S. National Register of Historic Places
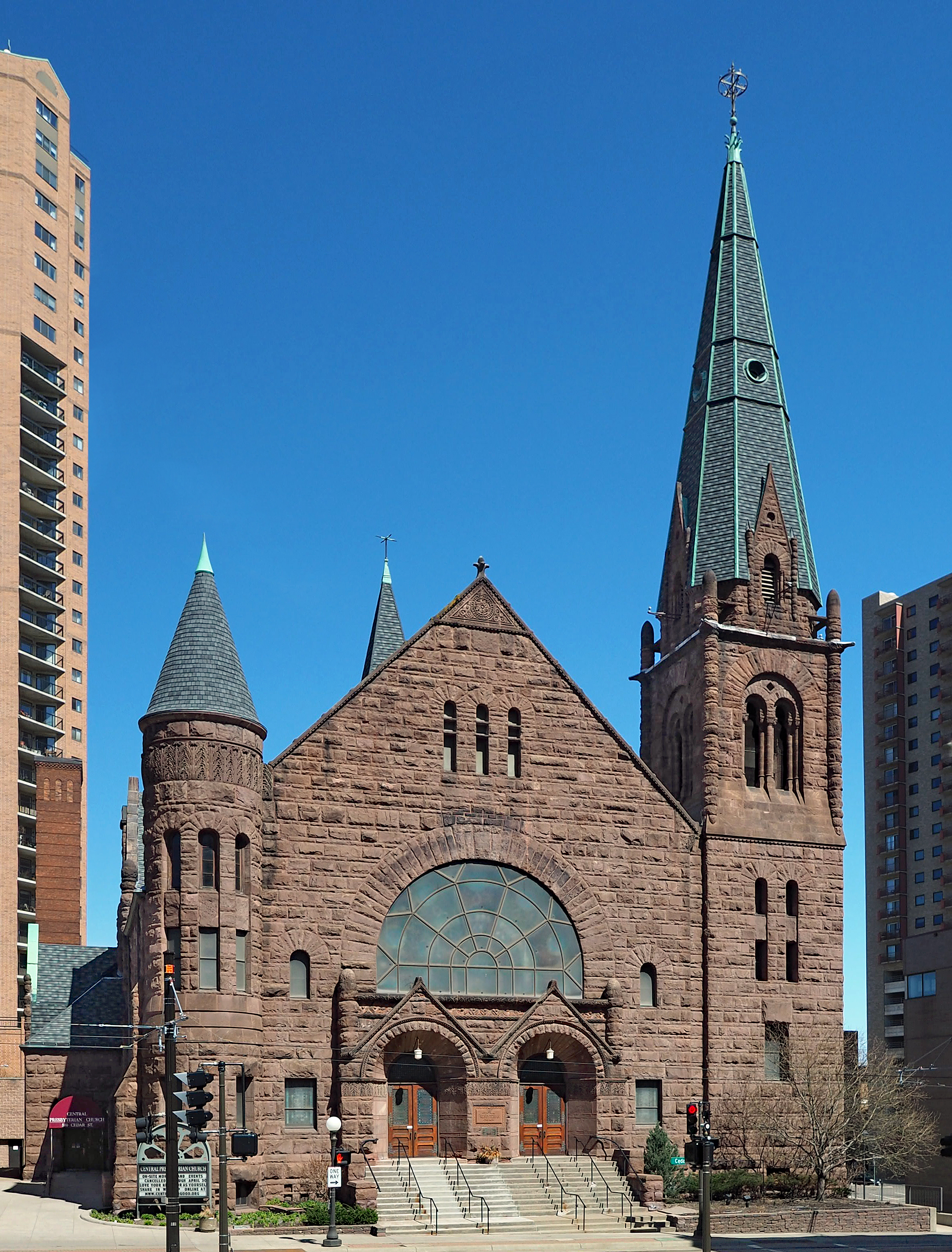
- Central Presbyterian Church from the west

- Location within Minnesota Location within the United States
- Location: 500 Cedar Street, Saint Paul, Minnesota
- Coordinates: 44°56′59″N 93°5′46″W
- Area: Less than 1 acre
- Built: 1889– (1900)(presumed date of finish of the edifice religious)
- Architect: Warren H. Hayes
- Architectural style: Richardsonian Romanesque
- NRHP reference No.: 83000926
- Added to NRHP: February 10, 1983

Central Presbyterian Church is a church in downtown Saint Paul, Minnesota, United States. The congregation was founded in 1852 and built its first building in 1854, which was later enlarged during the 1870s. The rapidly growing congregation outgrew the building, so they built a new church building in 1889. The building, an example of Richardsonian Romanesque architecture, is listed on the National Register of Historic Places.

The arched entrances, a hallmark of the Richardsonian Romanesque style, feature a number of carved floral and geometric motifs. The façade is coarsely carved Lake Superior brownstone with a massive 90-foot gable over the arches. The architect, Warren H. Hayes, laid out the seating in the Akron Plan. It features a raised semi-circular chancel, which places the speaker in the front of the congregation and at the center of the chancel. The pews are curved and laid out in a semi-circular pattern on a sloping floor. This design, similar to a theater's design, allows each person to see and hear the speaker.
