= Minneapolis Scottish Rite Temple =

Historic building in Minnesota, US

- Fowler Methodist Episcopal Church; Minneapolis Scottish Rite Temple
- U.S. National Register of Historic Places
- Minneapolis Landmark
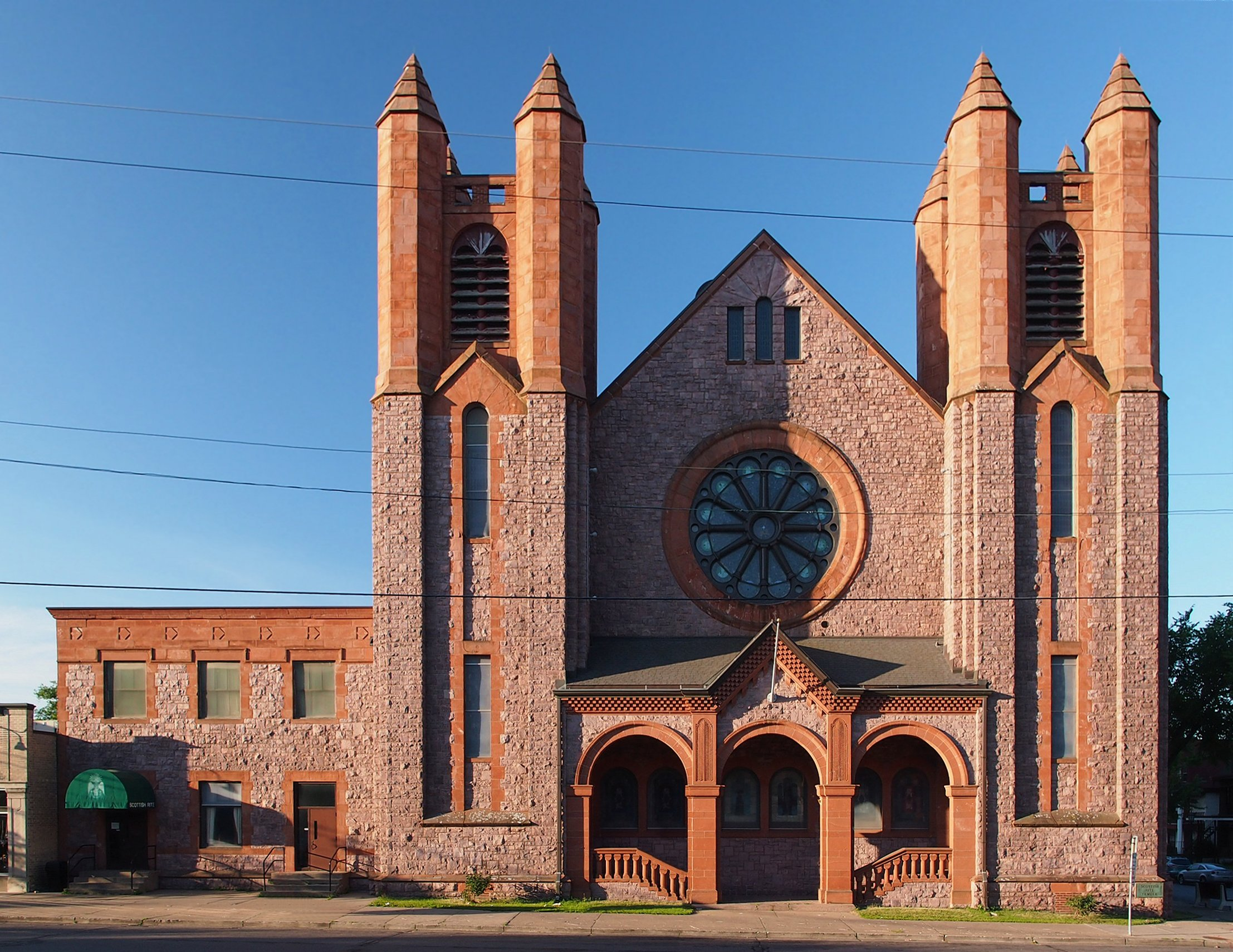
- The building from the north

- Location within Minnesota Location within the United States
- Location: 2011 Dupont Avenue South, Minneapolis, Minnesota
- Coordinates: 44°57′45″N 93°17′34″W
- Built: 1894; expanded and remodeled 1906
- Architect: Warren H. Hayes; Harry Wild Jones
- Architectural style: Romanesque
- NRHP reference No.: 76001062

Significant dates
- Added to NRHP: January 30, 1976
- Designated MPLSL: 1986

The Scottish Rite Temple, formerly the Fowler Methodist Episcopal Church, is a historic church building in the Lowry Hill neighborhood of Minneapolis, Minnesota, United States. It was designed by architects Warren H. Hayes and Harry Wild Jones. The original portion, the rear chapel, was designed by Warren H. Hayes and built in 1894. When the congregation expanded and more funds were available, Harry Wild Jones designed an addition that expanded it to a much larger structure. This was completed in 1906.

The Fowler congregation merged with the Hennepin Avenue Methodist Church in 1915, and the Scottish Rite Temple bought the building the next year. They made some modifications to the auditorium to accommodate Masonic rituals, but most of the original features were kept, including extensive use of stained glass. The exterior is built of hard quartzite from southwestern Minnesota, along with red sandstone trim. It has two massive towers, three arches over the entry porch, and a 24-foot-diameter (7.3 m) rose window. The church was listed on the National Register of Historic Places in 1976.

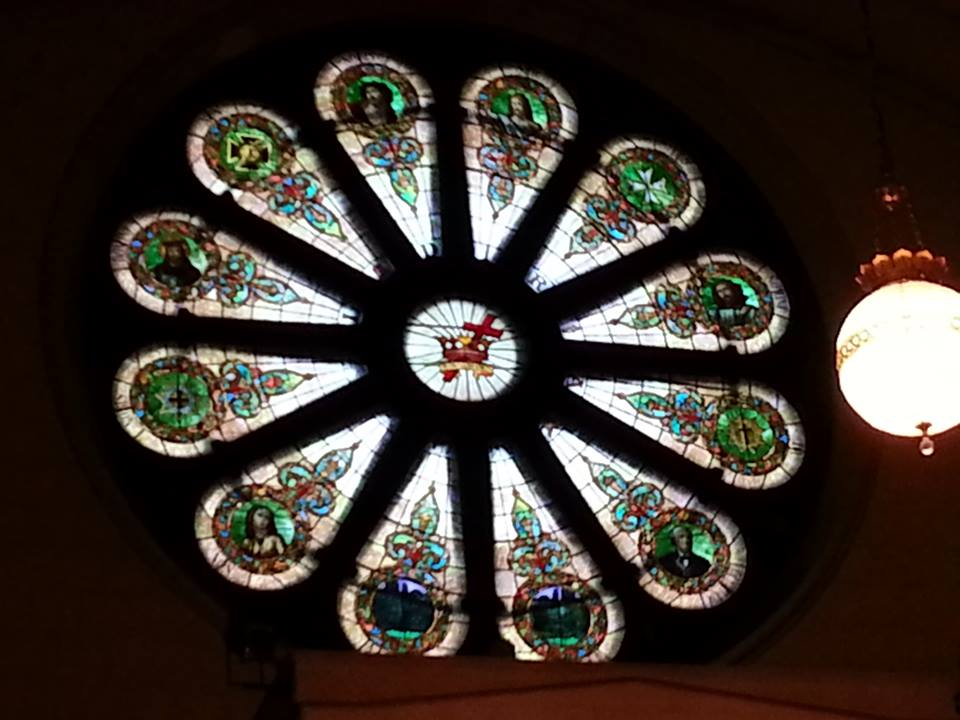
Interior view of the Masonic Knights Templar Rose Window

== See also ==
- List of Masonic buildings in the United States
- List of Methodist churches in the United States
- National Register of Historic Places listings in Hennepin County, Minnesota
