= Dinkytown =

Dinkytown Dinkytown, USA
- Commercial District
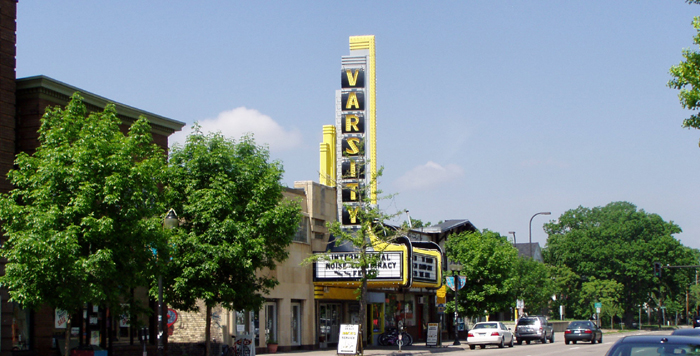
- The Varsity Theater on 4th Street SE
- Interactive map of Dinkytown
- Coordinates: 44°58′51″N 93°14′10″W
- Country: United States
- State: Minnesota
- County: Hennepin
- City: Minneapolis
- Neighborhood: Marcy-Holmes
- Branded: 1940s
- Founder: Unknown
- Named for: Grodnik or Dinkys
- City Council Ward: 2

Government
  - Councilmember: Robin Wonsley
- Elevation: 830 ft (253 m)
- Time zone: UTC-6 (CST)
  - Summer (DST): UTC-5 (CDT)
- Area code: 612

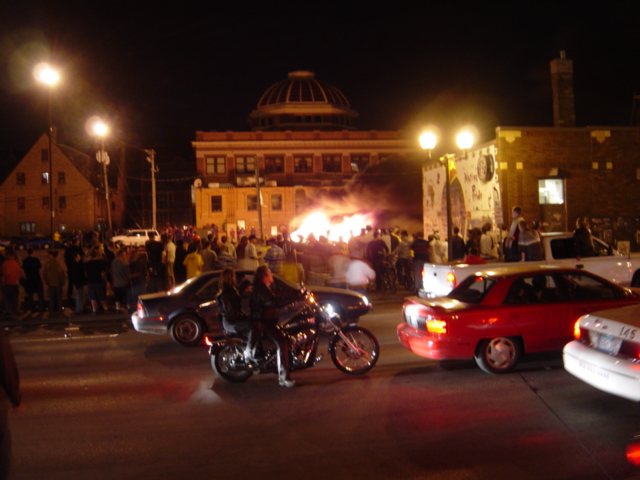
Gophers fans riot in Dinkytown after the Gophers won the 2003 Frozen Four

Dinkytown is a historic commercial hub in Minneapolis's Marcy-Holmes neighborhood, centered at 14th Avenue and 4th Street SE. Located immediately north of the University of Minnesota's East Bank campus, the district spans several city blocks packed with independent businesses, restaurants, and student apartments.

== Notable landmarks ==
Notable landmarks include the Dinkydome (a former theological seminary converted to a food court, which sometime later was converted into loft space), the Loring Pasta Bar (formerly Gray's Campus Drug and also the building where Bob Dylan lived in Minneapolis), Al's Breakfast (arguably the city's smallest restaurant), and the Varsity Theater. It's also the location of the second store opened by Richard M. Schulze called "Sound of Music", which later became Best Buy and is now closed.

== Notable establishments ==
The former Marshall-University High School on the corner of 14th Avenue and 5th Street was closed in 1982 due to changing city population demographics and was purchased and converted into the University Technology Enterprise Center (UTEC) for startups. The building was razed in 2013, and today the location is home to The Marshall, an apartment building for University students. The Chateau co-op built their brutalist-style 22-story apartment in 1973 at 13th Avenue Southeast and 5th Street Southeast.

== History ==
The City of Minneapolis' Heritage Preservation designated a portion of the area as the Dinkytown Commercial Historic District in 2015, due to its significance in the history of streetcar development. The historic district covers an area roughly two blocks around, surrounding the intersection of 14th Avenue Southeast and 4th Street Southeast.

The name Dinkytown is of uncertain origin, although it was in definite use by 1948, when the Dinkytown Business Association formed. Stories regarding the origin of the name include:

- The streetcars, called Dinkys, that used to provide transit throughout the area.
- The theatre in Dinkytown had only four rows of seats, and for years was known as "The Dinky Theater." Shortly thereafter, it was just "The Dinky."
- It's a small (dinky) town-like area; everything is within walking distance.
- The Loring Pasta Bar, previously Gray's Drug on 14th Avenue Southeast and 4th Street Southeast, has the name of an early owner carved in cement over the doorway: "Grodnik." Theories claim this means a small (or dinky) town, under the claim that "Grod" means "town" and "-nik" is the diminutive form. Another possible translation (from Polish and Belarusian) is "gardener"; "grod" meaning "garden", and"-nik" as a person-reference, giving "one who gardens".
