= List of City of Minneapolis designated landmarks =

List of local historic sites in Minneapolis

Designated landmarks of the City of Minneapolis are determined by the Heritage Preservation Commission, which is overseen by the Community Planning & Economic Development (CPED). Many of these landmarks are also listed on the National Register of Historic Places. The City of Minneapolis has over 175 landmarks and 18 historic districts.

== Heritage Preservation Commission ==
The heritage preservation commission was established by Minnesota Statutes sections 138.71 through 138.75, Minnesota Historic District Act of 1971, and Minnesota Statutes section 471.193, Municipal Heritage Preservation, Code of Ordinance § 599.120 of the Heritage Preservation Ordinance.

=== Criteria ===
Criteria is established in Code of Ordinance § 599.210.

The following criteria shall be considered in determining whether a property is worthy of designation as a landmark or historic district because of its historical, cultural, architectural, archaeological or engineering significance:

1. The property is associated with significant events or with periods that exemplify broad patterns of cultural, political, economic or social history.
2. The property is associated with the lives of significant persons or groups.
3. The property contains or is associated with distinctive elements of city or neighborhood identity.
4. The property embodies the distinctive characteristics of an architectural or engineering type or style, or method of construction.
5. The property exemplifies a landscape design or development pattern distinguished by innovation, rarity, uniqueness or quality of design or detail.
6. (The property exemplifies works of master builders, engineers, designers, artists, craftsmen or architects.
7. The property has yielded, or may be likely to yield, information important in prehistory or history.

== Color markings (highest noted listing) ==
Minneapolis Landmark
Minneapolis Historic District
National Register of Historic Places (NRHP)
NRHP historic district
NRHP historic district contributing property
National Historic Landmark
demolished

== List of individual Minneapolis landmarks ==
#	Name	Image	Neighborhood	Address	Date (NRHP date)	Description
1	Adath Jeshurun Synagogue		South Uptown	3400 Dupont Avenue S. 44°56′28″N 93°17′37″W	1998	The first Orthodox synagogue in Minneapolis, built in 1926 for a congregation founded in 1884.
2	Advance Thresher–Emerson Newton Co. Building		Downtown East	700–708 3rd Street S. 44°58′36.5″N 93°15′32″W	1977 (1977)	Adjacent Chicago School buildings designed by Kees and Colburn and built in 1900 and 1904.
3	Architects and Engineers Building		Loring Park	1200–08 2nd Avenue S. 44°58′15″N 93°16′26″W	1980 (1984)	1920 Renaissance Revival office building designed by Hewitt & Brown.
4	Augsburg Old Main		Cedar-Riverside	731 21st Avenue S. 44°57′56.5″N 93°14′31″W	1984 (1983)	1901 Renaissance Revival campus building originally housing the nation's first Norwegian Lutheran seminary.
5	Avalon Theater		Midtown Phillips	1500 Lake Street E. 44°56′55″N 93°15′13″W	1990	Prominent Streamline Moderne theater, stemming from a 1937 expansion of a 1924 core. A long-serving cinema into the 1980s, now In the Heart of the Beast Puppet and Mask Theatre.
6	Backus House		Lyndale	212 36th Street W. 44°56′16.5″N 93°16′55.7″W	1987	Exemplary 1915 Prairie School house designed for affordability.
7	Baker–Emerson House		Hawthorne	2215 Dupont Avenue N. 45°0′7.2″N 93°17′35″W	1995	1895 house exemplifying the middle-class homes of the decade.
8	Band Box Diner		Elliot Park	729 10th Street S. 44°58′8.5″N 93°15′48.5″W	2000	1939 prefabricated diner designed to evoke the neatness of a hat box, exemplifying programmatic architecture.
9	Bardwell–Ferrant House		Phillips West	2500 Portland Avenue S. 44°57′25.7″N 93°16′5″W	1983 (1984)	Distinctive house mixing an 1883 Queen Anne core with an 1890 Moorish Revival renovation.
10	Basilica of Saint Mary		Loring Park	88 17th Street N. 44°58′23″N 93°17′11″W	1986 (1975)	The first Catholic basilica in the United States, built 1907–1913 in Neoclassical and Baroque Revival styles.
11	Beard House		Tangletown	5100 Nicollet Avenue S. 44°54′37″N 93°16′42.5″W	1995	1888 Shingle style house of art collector Harington Beard, owner of the first commercial art gallery in Minneapolis, and a sponsor and board member in education and the arts.
12	Bennett–McBride House		Central	3116 3rd Avenue S. 44°56′45.8″N 93°16′23″W	1976 (1977)	1891 Queen Anne house designed by master builder T.P. Healy from an architectural pattern book.
13	Bovey House		Loring Park	400 Clifton Avenue; 44°58′0.5″N 93°17′6″W	1986	1916 Colonial Revival house, one of the few urban houses in Minneapolis–Saint Paul designed by Chicago-based architect Howard Van Doren Shaw.
14	Brooberg House		Phillips West	727 24th Street E. 44°57′32″N 93°15′48.5″W	1998	1905 house representing the burgeoning Swedish American community in early-20th-century South Minneapolis.
15	Brooks Mansion		Phillips West	2445 Park Avenue; 44°57′27.2″N 93°15′52″W	2015	1907 Venetian Gothic mansion designed by father-and-son architects Franklin B. and Louis Long on Park Avenue's mansion row for industrialist and civic leader Anson Strong Brooks.
16	Butler Brothers Building		Downtown West	518 1st Avenue N. and 100/116 6th Street N. 44°58′48″N 93°16′29″W	1973 (1971)	Exemplary large warehouse of the early 20th century, built 1906–1908 in a mix of Chicago School and Gothic Revival architecture.
17	Calvary Baptist Church		Whittier	2608 Blaisdell Avenue S. 44°57′19″N 93°16′48″W	1995 (2021)	1889 church with 1903 and 1928 additions, designed by Warren H. Hayes and Harry Wild Jones for a congregation established in 1879.
18	Camden Park State Bank		Camden	705 42nd Avenue N. 45°1′53″N 93°17′18″W	2015	1910 social hall designed by Septimus James Bowler, expanded with a 1920 bank storefront by Ernest C. Haley; together hosting a variety of essential services for a neighborhood developing at the end of a streetcar line.
19	Elbert Carpenter House		Loring Park	314 Clifton Avenue; 44°57′59″N 93°17′2.7″W	1978 (1977)	1906 Georgian Revival house designed by William Channing Whitney for a prominent lumber mill executive who helped organize and support the Minneapolis Symphony Orchestra.
20	Eugene Carpenter House		Loring Park	300 Clifton Avenue; 44°57′58.5″N 93°17′0″W	1978 (1977)	1890 house given a Georgian Revival remodel in 1906 for Eugene Carpenter, who followed his father Elbert as a lumber executive and arts patron, in his case for what is now the Minneapolis Institute of Art.
21	Case–Lang House		Near North	1508 Dupont Avenue N. 44°59′40.2″N 93°17′32.5″W	1983	One of the city's few remaining houses from the 1860s, initially built in Greek Revival style 1865–70 and given Italianate elements in subsequent decades.
22	Cattanach House		Como	1031 13th Avenue SE; 44°59′19.6″N 93°14′1″W	1985	1893 cottage unusually constructed of limestone, an expensive material usually reserved for foundations and industrial or commercial buildings.
23	Chadwick Cottages		Linden Hills	2617 40th Street W. 44°55′49″N 93°18′50.2″W	1983 (1984)	Two 1902 rental cottages illustrative of the simple first houses commonly built around the city's lakes. Joined into a single residence in 1972 with a rear addition.
24	Chase House		Central	3045 5th Avenue S. 44°56′48.8″N 93°16′7.5″W	2012	1902 house and 1910 garage noted for their Shingle style architecture, designed by master architect William M. Kenyon and constructed by master builder Maurice Schumacher.
25	Christ Church Lutheran		Longfellow	3244 34th Avenue S. 44°56′37″N 93°13′24″W	1978 (2001)	1949 International Style church, an influential master work of Eliel Saarinen.
26	Coe House		Stevens Square	1700 3rd Avenue S. 44°57′58″N 93°16′23″W	1983 (1984)	A superlative example of an upper-middle-class Queen Anne house, built in 1884, with an 1886 carriage house.
27	Como-Harriet Streetcar Line		Linden Hills	42nd Street W. at Queen Avenue S. 44°55′40″N 93°18′34.5″W	1986 (1977)	1908 streetcar operating on a restored 1.5-mile (2.4 km) section of 1887 track; a vestige of the city's public transit system as it existed 1884–1954.
28	Concrete Block House 2		Hawthorne	2611 3rd Street N. 45°0′23.1″N 93°17′1.5″W	1984	1885 house, one of nine nearby dwellings that were an early experiment in the use of concrete blocks for residential buildings. The façade is covered by a later wooden addition.
29	Concrete Block House 3		Hawthorne	2617 3rd Street N. 45°0′23.4″N 93°17′1.5″W	1984	1885 house, one of nine nearby dwellings that were an early experiment in the use of concrete blocks for residential buildings.
30	Concrete Block House 4		Hawthorne	2619 3rd Street N. 45°0′23.7″N 93°17′1.5″W	1984	1885 house, one of nine nearby dwellings that were an early experiment in the use of concrete blocks for residential buildings.
31	Concrete Block House 5		Hawthorne	2705 3rd Street N. 45°0′26.8″N 93°17′1.5″W	1984	1885 house, one of nine nearby dwellings that were an early experiment in the use of concrete blocks for residential buildings.
32	Concrete Block House 6		Hawthorne	2729 3rd Street N.	1984	1885 house, one of nine nearby dwellings that were an early experiment in the use of concrete blocks for residential buildings. Demolished in 1996.
33	Concrete Block House 7		Hawthorne	2831 3rd Street N. 45°0′33.8″N 93°17′1.5″W	1984	1885 house, one of nine nearby dwellings that were an early experiment in the use of concrete blocks for residential buildings.
34	Concrete Block House 8		Hawthorne	2826 4th Street N. 45°0′33.4″N 93°17′4.5″W	1984	1885 house, one of nine nearby dwellings that were an early experiment in the use of concrete blocks for residential buildings.
35	Concrete Block House 8		Hawthorne	2828 4th Street N. 45°0′33.8″N 93°17′4.5″W	1984	1885 house, one of nine nearby dwellings that were an early experiment in the use of concrete blocks for residential buildings.
36	Concrete Block Rowhouse		Hawthorne	300–314½ 26th Avenue N. 45°0′22″N 93°17′2″W	1984	1885 rowhouse, one of nine nearby dwellings that were an early experiment in the use of concrete blocks for residential buildings.
37	Cook House		Northeast Park	948 18th Avenue NE; 45°0′20.8″N 93°14′46.8″W	2021	1889 house noted for its atypical Queen Anne architecture in brick and for its early conversion to a multi-family residence in a growing Scandinavian immigrant neighborhood.
38	Cream of Wheat Building		Mid-City Industrial	730 Stinson Boulevard NE; 44°59′53″N 93°13′41″W	2005	Cream of Wheat factory built 1927–28, significant as a reminder of the city's milling history and a distinctive work of architect Walter H. Wheeler.
39	Crowell Block		Whittier	2957 Lyndale Avenue S. 44°56′54.7″N 93°17′16″W	1985	A superlative example of Richardsonian Romanesque architecture, built in 1888.
40	Cutter House		Marcy-Holmes	400 10th Avenue SE; 44°58′58.3″N 93°14′27″W	1976 (1976)	The city's only surviving example of Carpenter Gothic architecture, built in 1856 and expanded in 1874.
41	Dania Hall		Cedar-Riverside	427 Cedar Avenue	1976 (1974)	1886 social center for Danish immigrants; also noted for its Eclectic architecture. Damaged by fire and demolished in 2000.
42	Day House		Lowry Hill	1900 Colfax Avenue S. 44°57′51.5″N 93°17′31.5″W	2010	1908 Colonial Revival house designed by prolific local architect Ernest C. Haley.
43	Despatch Laundry		Whittier	2611 1st Avenue S. 44°57′18.3″N 93°16′35″W	1984	1929 commercial building noted for its unusual Moorish Revival architecture.
44	Dunn Mansion		Loring Park	337 Oak Grove Street; 44°58′1.5″N 93°17′4.5″W	2011	1893 Richardsonian Romanesque house designed by Edward S. Stebbins; one of the few vestiges from when Loring Park was characterized by single-family homes.
45	Farmers and Mechanics Savings Bank		Downtown West	115 4th Street S. 44°58′43.5″N 93°16′4″W	1980 (1984)	Former bank building exemplifying the Beaux-Arts style once popular for financial institutions; first constructed in 1891 and expanded in 1908.
46	Fire Station 13		Ericsson	4201 Cedar Avenue; 44°55′36.3″N 93°14′49″W	2003 (2003)	1923 fire station designed in American Craftsman style to blend into a growing residential neighborhood at what was then the southern edge of Minneapolis.
47	Fire Station 19		Prospect Park	2001 University Avenue SE; 44°58′33.5″N 93°13′36.5″W	1982 (1982)	Exemplary late-19th-century fire station built in 1893, and the location where Lieutenant Louis Rober (stationed here 1896–1906) invented a scaled-down version of baseball that was ultimately adapted into softball.
48	Fire Station 24		Hiawatha	4501 Hiawatha Avenue; 44°55′16.7″N 93°13′10″W	2022	The only Minneapolis fire station staffed by a segregated all-Black crew, from its construction in 1907 to 1912. A reminder of the contributions of Black firefighters like John Cheatham and also the historical discrimination of the Minneapolis Fire Department.
49	Fire Station 28		Linden Hills	2724 43rd Street W. 44°55′29″N 93°18′50″W	1995 (1993)	One of the last two fire stations built in Minneapolis, established in 1914 as streetcar transit transformed the last corners of the city into year-round residential neighborhoods needing full city services.
50	First Church of Christ Scientist		Elliot Park	614–20 15th Street E.	1986 (1986)	The first Christian Science church in Minneapolis, built in 1897 in a Beaux-Arts design that included some of the city's only Doric order elements. Demolished in 2022.
51	First Congregational Church of Minnesota		Marcy-Holmes	500 8th Avenue SE; 44°59′6″N 93°14′34″W	1974 (1979)	Exemplary Romanesque Revival church built in 1886, and a landmark of community identity.
52	Florence Court		Marcy-Holmes	1022 University Avenue SE; 44°58′51″N 93°14′33″W	1983	1886 rowhouse that was part of a housing development enclosing an interior courtyard; the first design of its kind in Minneapolis.
53	Flour Exchange Building		Downtown West	310 4th Avenue S. 44°58′42″N 93°15′50″W	1980 (1977)	The city's first modern high-rise office building, designed by Long and Kees in Chicago School style and built in two phases: 1892–93 and 1909.
54	Forum Cafeteria		Downtown West	36–40 7th Street S. 44°58′40.5″N 93°16′26″W	1975	The Twin Cities' leading example of Art Deco interior design, installed 1929–30 and reassembled in the 1970s 100 feet (30 m) from its original location due to construction of the Minneapolis City Center.
55	Foshay Tower		Downtown West	821–37 Marquette Avenue; 44°58′28″N 93°16′18″W	1984 (1978)	Art Deco skyscraper inspired by the Washington Monument. It was the city's tallest building after it was constructed 1927–29, an endeavor requiring novel feats of engineering.
56	Fournier House		Cleveland	3505 Sheridan Avenue N. 45°1′8″N 93°18′44.5″W	1995 (1995)	1910 house exemplifying Prairie School architecture from the era of its spreading popularity in the region.
57	Fowler Methodist and Episcopal Church		Lowry Hill	2011 Dupont Avenue S. 44°57′45″N 93°17′34″W	1986 (1976)	Romanesque Revival church begun by Warren H. Hayes in 1894 shortly before his death and completed by Harry Wild Jones in 1906, forming the two architects' only joint project. Converted into the Minneapolis Scottish Rite Temple in 1915.
58	Franklin Avenue Bridge		Seward, Prospect Park	Franklin Avenue at the Mississippi River; 44°57′49″N 93°13′23″W	1985 (1978)	Innovative bridge constructed 1919–1923, incorporating the world's longest concrete arch ever built at the time.
59	Franklin House		Kenwood	2405 22nd Street W. 44°57′36″N 93°18′39″W	1996	Distinctive Prairie School house built in 1915.
60	Franklin Library		Ventura Village	1314 Franklin Avenue E. 44°57′47″N 93°15′21″W	1997 (2000)	1914 Renaissance Revival built with donations from the Andrew Carnegie Foundation and William L. McKnight to serve a Scandinavian immigrant neighborhood during a major library system expansion under the influential leadership of Gratia Countryman.
61	Fredrika Bremer Intermediate School		Folwell	1214 Lowry Avenue N. 45°0′49″N 93°17′42″W	1985 (1978)	The city's third-oldest extant school building, constructed in Romanesque Revival style in 1886 and expanded in 1897, 1910, and 1916.
62	Friedell House		Cedar-Isles-Dean	2700 Chowen Avenue S. 44°57′12″N 93°19′31″W	1996	One of very few Streamline Moderne houses built in Minneapolis in the decade leading up to its completion in 1940.
63	Garlick-Magney House		Fulton	5329 Washburn Avenue S. 44°54′22″N 93°19′2″W	1987	1922 house and gardens exemplifying English Medieval Cottage style.
64	Gethsemane Episcopal Church		Downtown West	901 4th Avenue S. 44°58′20.5″N 93°16′6″W	1983 (1984)	Gothic Revival church built 1883–84.
65	Gluek Building		Downtown West	14 6th Street N. 44°58′46″N 93°16′26.5″W	1984	Distinctive Beaux-Arts building constructed in 1902 to house a bar and restaurant operated by the Gluek Brewing Company, one of the oldest businesses in Minneapolis, founded in 1857.
66	Gluek House		Lowry Hill	2447 Bryant Avenue S. 44°57′27.3″N 93°17′25″W	1987 (1990)	1902 house and carriage house noted for their lavish mix of Queen Anne and Colonial Revival architecture.
67	Grain Belt Brewery Brewhouse		Sheridan	1220 Marshall Street; 44°59′59″N 93°16′13″W	1977	Prominent brewery constructed 1891–92; part of the only surviving complex from the city's early brewing industry.
68	Grain Belt Brewery Office Building		Sheridan	1215 Marshall Street; 44°59′58.3″N 93°16′9.3″W	1977	1893 brewery office; part of the only surviving complex from the city's early brewing industry.
69	Grain Exchange		Downtown West	400–412 4th Street S. 44°58′40″N 93°15′50″W	1977 (1977)	One of the city's first steel frame buildings, designed in Chicago School style by Kees and Colburn and built 1900–02, with a 1909 Renaissance Revival addition by Long, Lamoreaux & Long and 1928 addition by Bertrand and Chamberlain.
70	Granada Theater		East Bde Maka Ska	3022 Hennepin Avenue; 44°56′51.3″N 93°17′55″W	1991	1927 atmospheric theater noted for its distinctive Churrigueresque architecture and status as the first neighborhood theater to show sound films.
71	Green & DeLaittre Warehouse		North Loop	500 3rd Street N. 44°59′8″N 93°16′33″W	2010	1908 warehouse significant as the city's oldest surviving building supported by the reinforced concrete columns invented by local engineer C.A.P. Turner, which were quickly adopted worldwide.
72	Groves House		Lynnhurst	4885 East Lake Harriet Parkway; 44°54′54″N 93°18′26.3″W	1987	Exemplary Mediterranean Villa–style house built in 1928.
73	Hafstad House		Prospect Park	159 Arthur Avenue SE; 44°57′59.8″N 93°12′59″W	1983	Exemplary Eastlake movement house built in 1894.
74	Handicraft Guild		Downtown West	89–91 10th Street S. 44°58′24.5″N 93°16′26″W	1998	1907 building that housed the Handicraft Guild—one of the nation's first Arts and Crafts organizations and Minnesota's first art school. Further noted for its fittingly restrained Colonial Revival architecture.
75	Harrington House		Phillips West	2540 Park Avenue S. 44°57′21.5″N 93°15′57″W	1988	Grand Renaissance Revival house built in 1902 on Park Avenue's mansion row for grain magnate Charles M. Harrington, a civic leader and one of the city's wealthiest residents.
76	Hennepin Theatre		Downtown West	910 Hennepin Avenue; 44°58′35″N 93°16′39″W	1996 (1996)	Prominent downtown theater built 1920–21; noted for its lavish Beaux-Arts interior and long-serving status as a performing arts venue.
77	Hewitt House		Stevens Square	126 Franklin Avenue E. 44°57′46.5″N 93°16′30″W	1986 (1978)	1906 Tudor Revival house designed for himself by master architect Edwin Hawley Hewitt.
78	Hewson House		Whittier	2008 Pillsbury Avenue; 44°57′44.4″N 93°16′54″W	2011	1905 brick Colonial Revival house on a street favored by the era's wealthy professionals. Constructed by a trifecta of notable craftsmen: architects Kees and Colburn, builder T.P. Healy, and interior decorator John S. Bradstreet.
79	Hinkle House		Elliot Park	619–621 10th Street S. 44°58′11.5″N 93°15′57″W	1998 (1984)	One of downtown Minneapolis's few extant Colonial Revival houses, designed by William Channing Whitney and built 1886–87 for flour mill executive and civic leader William H. Hinkle.
80	Hollywood Theater		Audubon Park	2815 Johnson Street NE; 45°1′8.7″N 93°14′12″W	1990 (2014)	Representative neighborhood movie theater of the 1930s, designed in Streamline Moderne style by cinema specialists Liebenberg and Kaplan and built on a streetcar line in 1935.
81	Holmes House		Elliot Park	1418 Park Avenue	1983	1887 house noted for its unusual lightly-shingled Shingle style architecture mixed with a Richardsonian Romanesque stone porch. Destroyed by an accidental fire in 1988.
82	Holy Trinity Episcopal Church		Marcy-Holmes	316 4th Avenue SE; 44°59′9″N 93°14′59″W	2023	1873 High Victorian Gothic church given a matching expansion in 1890—the city's oldest church with no alteration in architectural style.
83	Hosmer Library		Central	347 36th Street E. 44°56′15″N 93°16′14″W	1997 (2000)	Carnegie library built in Tudor Revival style in 1916; among the first of 13 neighborhood branches opened under the influential leadership of Gratia Countryman.
84	I.O.O.F. Hennepin Lodge No. 4		Hawthorne	404 West Broadway; 44°59′58″N 93°17′7″W	2016	Early example of an Independent Order of Odd Fellows meeting hall, built in 1897 when fraternal orders were the primary source of social welfare services.
85	Jones House		Tangletown	5101 Nicollet Avenue S. 44°54′37″N 93°16′40″W	1986 (1976)	1887 Shingle/Norman Revival house designed for himself by architect and civic leader Harry Wild Jones.
86	Joyce Memorial Methodist Church		South Uptown	1219 31st Street W. 44°56′47″N 93°17′43″W	2020	One of only two Mission Revival churches in Minneapolis, designed by Downs & Eads and built in 1907.
87	Kaufmann House		Cedar-Isles-Dean	20 Park Lane; 44°57′22″N 93°19′11″W	1987	Exemplary International Style house, built 1935–36.
88	Kelly House		Fulton	2901 Brookwood Terrace; 44°54′21.5″N 93°18′59.5″W	2023	Exemplary Spanish Eclectic house, built in 1927.
89	Kenwood Water Tower		Kenwood	1724 Kenwood Parkway; 44°58′2.9″N 93°18′24″W	1980	1910 water tower exemplifying the eclecticism in architecture popular around the turn of the 20th century.
90	Keyes House		East Isles	2225 East Lake of the Isles Parkway; 44°57′36″N 93°18′4″W	1998	1904 house designed by architect Adam Lansing Dorr, whose characteristic personalization is expressed here by a transitional Queen Anne to American Craftsman style.
91	Kinnard-Haines Co. Building		Lind-Bohanon	826 44th Avenue N. 45°2′8.2″N 93°17′28.4″W	1995	1902 office, the last remaining building from a company that produced an early gas-powered tractor beginning in 1899.
92	Ladd House		Loring Park	131 Oak Grove Street; 44°57′58″N 93°16′51.5″W	2011	1889 Richardsonian Romanesque house characterizing the upper-class homes built around the city's first park; designed by Harry Wild Jones for innovative real estate agent Henry Ladd.
93	Lake Harriet Picnic Pavilion and Restrooms		Linden Hills	4525 Upton Avenue S. 44°55′12.4″N 93°18′50″W	1980	Two 1891 restrooms and a 1904 picnic shelter all designed in Shingle style by Harry Wild Jones.
94	Lakewood Memorial Chapel		East Harriet	3600 Hennepin Avenue; 44°56′10″N 93°17′57″W	1983 (1983)	Cemetery chapel and crematorium built 1908–1910, noted for its exemplary Neo-Byzantine architecture and elaborate interior mosaics.
95	Layman's Cemetery		East Phillips	2925 Cedar Avenue; 44°56′59″N 93°14′41″W	2006 (2002)	The city's oldest intact cemetery, receiving burials 1853–1920 of pioneers, veterans, African Americans, and European immigrants. Also an early focus of historic preservation efforts 1925–1942.
96	Lee House		Field	4600 Columbus Avenue S. 44°55′10.5″N 93°15′51″W	2016 (2014)	1923 house whose later purchase by a Black family led to one of the state's largest racially motivated protests July 11–16, 1931, representing housing discrimination in Minnesota.
97	Lee Townhouse		Elliot Park	623–25 9th Street S. 44°58′15″N 93°15′53″W	1985	1887 single-family townhouse; one of the city's few surviving examples of this late-19th-century trend in upper-class housing.
98	Legg House		Elliot Park	1601 Park Avenue S. 44°58′1.2″N 93°15′53″W	1984 (1976)	1887 Queen Anne house representative of the middle-class residences built in the city's late-19th-century housing developments.
99	Lein Duplex		St. Anthony East	444–446 Madison Street NE; 44°59′40.5″N 93°15′14″W	1983	1888 multi-family home mixing Italianate and Queen Anne features, representing the late-19th-century fad of combining multiple architectural styles.
100	Lind House		Lowry Hill	1775 Colfax Avenue S. 44°57′58″N 93°17′29.5″W	1985	House built 1905–1907 for politician John Lind, a Swedish immigrant who served as governor of Minnesota and U.S. Congressman.
101	Linden Hills Library		Linden Hills	2900 43rd Street W. 44°55′30″N 93°18′59″W	1997 (2000)	1931 library branch built during a major expansion under influential head librarian Gratia Countryman.
102	Linden Hills Methodist Episcopal Church		Fulton	3118 49th Street W. 44°54′52″N 93°19′11.5″W	1987	1907 church atypically using American Craftsman architecture; built as streetcar service fueled the growth of Linden Hills, and moved to its current location in 1916.
103	Little Sisters of the Poor Home for the Aged		Sheridan	215 Broadway Street NE; 44°59′56.5″N 93°15′55″W	1978 (1978)	Charitable senior housing facility in operation 1895–1977; a neighborhood institution and a master work of architect Frederick Corser, who designed the 1895 core and a 1905 addition.
104	Loberg Houses		Nicollet Island/East Bank	171–175 Island Avenue E. 44°59′22.5″N 93°15′48.5″W	1985	Two Greek Revival houses representing the Scandinavian immigrant community of Cedar-Riverside; likely self-built circa 1875 by carpenter brothers from Norway. Moved to Nicollet Island in 1990.
105	Lohmar House		Near North	1514 Dupont Avenue N. 44°59′41.3″N 93°17′32.5″W	1983 (1977)	Representative Queen Anne house, built in 1898.
106	Long House		Lowry Hill	25 Groveland Terrace; 44°58′3″N 93°17′25.5″W	1984	1894 Richardsonian Romanesque house designed by the architectural firm of Long and Kees for partner Franklin B. Long.
107	Loring Theater		Loring Park	1407 Nicollet Avenue S. 44°58′7.2″N 93°16′39″W	1990	1920 example of a neighborhood movie theater, designed by Kees and Colburn.
108	Lumber Exchange		Downtown West	423–25 Hennepin Avenue; 44°58′47″N 93°16′19″W	1983 (1983)	Prominent Richardsonian Romanesque building designed by Long and Kees and built in two phases 1885–1890 as a base for the city's significant 19th-century lumber industry.
109	Charles Lyon House		Loring Park	425 Oak Grove Street; 44°58′3.5″N 93°17′10″W	2011	1890 single-family home, one of the oldest surviving from a wealthy neighborhood that grew up around the city's first park; constructed in Shingle style by master builder Frank Griggs McMillan.
110	Daniel Lyon House		Loring Park	419 Oak Grove Street; 44°58′3″N 93°17′9″W	2011	1892 Colonial Revival house designed by Edward S. Stebbins. Together with the owner's son's home next door, it's one of the oldest surviving houses from a wealthy neighborhood built around the city's first park.
111	MacPhail School of Music		Downtown West	1128 La Salle Avenue S. 44°58′23″N 93°16′40″W	2001	1923 building designed by Magney and Tusler for a music school founded in 1907, reflecting the rising local interest in music and performing arts education.
112	Madison School		Elliot Park	501 15th Street E. 44°58′4″N 93°16′7″W	1983	Former school built 1887–1889 and used until 1982; noted for its eclectic architecture and status as the city's oldest extant school building.
113	Martin House		Lowry Hill	1300 Mount Curve Avenue; 44°58′4″N 93°17′45.5″W	1986 (1978)	1903 urban estate designed in Renaissance Revival style by William Channing Whitney.
114	Masonic Temple		Downtown West	524–30 Hennepin Avenue; 44°58′45″N 93°16′26″W	1980 (1975)	One of the few remaining examples of a Richardsonian Romanesque commercial block in downtown, designed by Long and Kees and built 1888–1890. Became the Hennepin Center for the Arts in 1978.
115	Maternity Hospital		Harrison	300 Queen Avenue N. 44°58′49″N 93°18′32″W	1986 (1980)	Three surviving buildings constructed in 1909, 1910, and 1916 for a woman-led maternity hospital in operation 1887–1956 to combat high rates of maternal mortality.
116	Mayhew Rowhouses		Elliot Park	614–626 9th Street S. 44°58′16.6″N 93°15′53″W	2022	The oldest surviving example of Elliot Park's once numerous rowhouses, built in 1886 in a mix of Richardsonian Romanesque and Queen Anne styles designed by Frederick Clarke.
117	McKnight Mansion		Phillips West	2200 Park Avenue; 44°57′38.4″N 93°15′57″W	2016	1892 Richardsonian Romanesque mansion designed by Bertrand and Keith on Park Avenue's mansion row for businessman Sumner T. McKnight.
118	Meader–Farnham House		Nicollet Island/East Bank	105 Island Avenue W. 44°59′20.7″N 93°15′56.8″W	1984	One of the city's oldest surviving buildings, an Italianate house constructed circa 1870 and moved to Nicollet Island in 1985.
119	Melrose Flats		Nicollet Island/East Bank	13–23 5th Street NE; 44°59′23″N 93°15′13″W	1985	Commercial block built 1890–1892 that exemplifies the elaborate and colorful designs of architect Charles Sumner Sedgwick.
120	Menage Cottage		Stevens Square	1808 4th Avenue S. 44°57′53.3″N 93°16′14″W	1983	1878 Gothic Revival cottage, one of the few surviving wood-frame examples of an uncommon style among the city's housing stock.
121	Mikro Kodesh Synagogue		Near North	1000 Oliver Avenue N. 44°59′17″N 93°18′24″W	1998	1926 synagogue of what became the Upper Midwest's largest congregation of Orthodox Judaism; reflecting the substantial Jewish population of North Minneapolis through much of the 20th century.
122	Milwaukee Road Depot		Downtown West	300 Washington Avenue S. 44°58′48″N 93°15′48″W	1979 (1978)	Minneapolis's oldest extant train complex, reflecting the transport connections that underpinned the city's regional importance; comprising a freight house (1879), Renaissance Revival depot (1897–99), and the only surviving steel truss-roofed train shed (1899) in the Upper Midwest.
123	Minneapolis Armory		Elliot Park	500–530 6th Street S. 44°58′30″N 93°15′49″W	2017 (1985)	Distinctive PWA Moderne facility for the Minnesota National Guard and Minnesota Naval Militia built 1935–36 as a New Deal project incorporating an early use of engineer Walter H. Wheeler's innovative ceiling design.
124	Minneapolis City Hall		Downtown West	315 4th Street S. 44°58′39″N 93°15′55″W	1977 (1974)	One of the nation's largest 19th-century municipal buildings—a prominent Richardsonian Romanesque city hall and county seat designed by Long and Kees and built 1889–1905.
125	Minneapolis Institute of Arts		Whittier	2400 3rd Avenue S. 44°57′31″N 93°16′26″W	1975	Monumental art museum whose core was built 1912–1915; a centerpiece of the neighborhood and a symbol of early civic efforts to promote art in Minneapolis.
126	Minnesota Spokesman-Recorder		Central	3744 4th Avenue S. 44°56′4.7″N 93°16′13.5″W	2015	1958 headquarters of Minnesota's longest-running Black newspaper, founded in 1934; serving a key role in what was primarily a Black neighborhood 1930s–1970s, and the location where photographer Gordon Parks began his career.
127	Moline, Milburn and Stoddard Co. Building		North Loop	250 3rd Avenue N. 44°59′2″N 93°16′25″W	1975 (1975)	1886 factory/warehouse with a 1902 addition—a functional and atypically simple design for the era using Chicago School architecture. Now the Traffic Zone Center for Visual Art.
128	Montefiore Cemetery and Chapel		Bryant	4153 3rd Avenue S. 44°55′38″N 93°16′18″W	2000	1876 cemetery and 1890 chapel established by the city's early population of German Jewish Americans.
129	Moorish Mansion Apartments		East Bde Maka Ska	3028 James Avenue S. 44°56′50.4″N 93°18′13.5″W	1985	1929 apartment building exemplifying Moorish Revival architecture.
130	Morse House		Whittier	2325–27 Pillsbury Avenue S. 44°57′33.5″N 93°16′51.5″W	1974 (1995)	Circa-1874 house exemplifying Italianate architecture.
131	Murphy House		Nicollet Island/East Bank	167 Island Avenue E. 44°59′23.1″N 93°15′49.3″W	1986	Circa-1875 house exemplifying Italianate architecture. Moved to Nicollet Island in 1988.
132	Neils House		Cedar-Isles-Dean	2801 Burnham Boulevard; 44°57′29″N 93°19′4″W	1986 (2004)	Innovative Usonian house built 1950–51 using expensive and atypical materials for Frank Lloyd Wright, such as exterior marble, aluminum windows, and a larch interior.
133	Nelson House		Willard-Hay	2620 8th Avenue N. 44°59′10.5″N 93°18′51.5″W	2025	Childhood home of Prince from 1965 to 1970, where he began developing many of the musical skills with which he would influence the Minneapolis sound.
134	New Century Mill		University	545 Oak Street SE	1984 (1980)	1900 steam-powered flour mill designed by engineer William Dixon Gray—a major evolution for a city previously dependent on hydropower from St. Anthony Falls. Heavily damaged by fire in 1990 and demolished.
135	Newell House		Stevens Square	1818 La Salle Avenue S. 44°57′53.2″N 93°16′47.5″W	1985 (1977)	1888 house noted for its exemplary Richardsonian Romanesque architecture and ownership by George Newell, founder of the grocery store chain that became SuperValu.
136	John Nordstrom Store		Seward	2110 24th Avenue S. 44°57′41.6″N 93°14′17″W	1983	Rare surviving example of the wood-frame neighborhood stores once common in late-19th-century Minneapolis. Built in 1883 and converted to a single-family home in 1979.
137	North Library		Near North	1834 Emerson Avenue N. 44°59′55″N 93°17′38″W	1984 (1977)	Former public library in Medieval Revival style, built in 1893 as one of the city's first branch libraries, and the first in the nation with open stacks.
138	North Side Station		Hawthorne	2418 Washington Avenue N. 45°0′17″N 93°16′53″W	2015	Last surviving carhouse of the Twin City Rapid Transit Company, operators of the metropolitan streetcar system that facilitated significant economic growth. Built in 1914 and partially subsumed by 1950s additions.
139	Northern Implement Co. Building		Downtown East	616 3rd Street South; 44°58′38″N 93°15′35″W	1977 (1977)	Distinctive 1910 building noted for its restrained Louis Sullivan–inspired design by Kees and Colburn.
140	Northwestern Knitting Co. Building		Sumner-Glenwood	700–728 Glenwood Avenue, 275 Market Street; 44°58′49″N 93°17′20″W	1984 (1983)	Five-building factory complex built 1904–1915 for Munsingwear, the nation's leading underwear manufacturer thanks to its innovative textile process. Also noted for the first all-reinforced concrete building in Minneapolis.
141	Nott House		Lowry Hill	15 Groveland Terrace; 44°58′1.5″N 93°17′23.3″W	1984	Neoclassical/Romanesque Revival house built 1893–94 as a showcase for an exclusive residential neighborhood planned by Thomas Lowry.
142	Oakland Apartments		Downtown West	213 9th Street S. 44°58′24″N 93°16′14.4″W	2019	One of the city's first multi-family residences, an 1889 Richardsonian Romanesque apartment building designed by Harry Wild Jones.
143	Ogden Apartment Hotel		Downtown West	66–68 12th Street S. 44°58′22″N 93°16′38.5″W	1992 (1992)	1910 example of an apartment hotel, an urban residential option popularized during housing shortages that offering flexible leases, furnished and unfurnished rooms, and meals from a central restaurant.
144	Old East Lake Library		Longfellow	2916 Lake Street E. 44°56′55″N 93°13′44.5″W	1997 (2000)	Early branch library opened under the influential leadership of head librarian Gratia Countryman; built in 1924 to serve a neighborhood of factory workers and their families.
145	Old Walker Library		Lowry Hill East	2901 Hennepin Avenue; 44°56′59.5″N 93°17′52.5″W	1997 (2000)	Early branch library opened under the influential leadership of head librarian Gratia Countryman; built in 1910.
146	Olson House		Lynnhurst	1914 49th Street W. 44°54′51.8″N 93°18′15″W	1986 (1974)	1922 house of progressive politician Floyd B. Olson: Hennepin County attorney, organizer of the Minnesota Farmer–Labor Party, and three-term governor of Minnesota.
147	Owre House		Kenwood	2625 Newton Avenue S. 44°57′27.7″N 93°18′22″W	1983 (1984)	1912 Prairie School house designed by Purcell, Feick and Elmslie.
148	Pantages Theater		Downtown West	708 Hennepin Avenue; 44°58′41″N 93°16′32″W	1997	1916 theater noted for its extravagant Beaux-Arts auditorium and association with vaudeville.
149	Parker House		Lynnhurst	4829 Colfax Avenue S. 44°54′54.3″N 93°17′30″W	1996 (1992)	1913 Prairie School house representing the signature architectural style of Purcell, Feick and Elmslie.
150	Pease–Rollins House		Nicollet Island/East Bank	101 Island Avenue W. 44°59′20.2″N 93°15′56.6″W	1986	One of the city's oldest surviving buildings, a Greek Revival house constructed circa 1864 and moved to Nicollet Island in 1986.
151	Pierson–Wold House		Lowry Hill	1779 Emerson Avenue S. 44°57′57.1″N 93°17′38.5″W	2008	1904 house whose notable inhabitants over the years included retailer Newton Pierson, bank executive Theodore Wold, and World War I aviator Ernest Groves Wold. Designed by master builder T.P. Healy in a neighborhood popular with prominent businessmen.
152	Pilgrim Rest Baptist Church		Shingle Creek	5100 James Avenue N. 45°2′52″N 93°18′5″W	2017	Church moved onsite in 1968 by one of the city's oldest African American congregations, founded in 1923 in a neighborhood where many participants in the Great Migration were able to buy property and put down roots.
153	Alfred Pillsbury House		Whittier	116 22nd Street E. 44°57′40.2″N 93°16′32.5″W	1975	1903 Tudor Revival mansion of a prominent businessman, art collector, and donor to the nearby Minneapolis Institute of Art.
154	Charles S. Pillsbury House		Whittier	100 22nd Street E. 44°57′40.2″N 93°16′34″W	1975	Gothic Revival designed by Hewitt and Brown, built 1912–1914.
155	Prospect Park Water Tower		Prospect Park	55 Malcolm Avenue SE; 44°58′7″N 93°12′46″W	1980 (1997)	1914 water tower with a Romanesque Revival belvedere and conical roof, forming a distinctive neighborhood landmark.
156	Purcell–Cutts House		East Isles	2328 Lake Place; 44°57′33.3″N 93°18′3″W	1975 (1974)	Exemplary 1913 Prairie School house designed by William Gray Purcell for himself and his family.
157	Quinlan House		Lowry Hill	1711 Emerson Avenue S. 44°58′0.8″N 93°17′38.6″W	2010 (2012)	1924 Renaissance Revival house and grounds commissioned by pioneering women's clothing retailer Elizabeth C. Quinlan from architect Frederick L. Ackerman, interior designer Mary Linton Bookwalter Ackerman, and blacksmith Samuel Yellin.
158	Rand Tower		Downtown West	527 Marquette Avenue S. 44°58′39″N 93°16′11″W	1994 (1994)	1929 skyscraper noted for its Art Moderne interior and exterior by Chicago-based architects Holabird & Root.
159	Rappaport House		Near North	636 Elwood Avenue N. 44°59′8″N 93°17′58″W	2011	House owned 1924–1946 by Edward and Gusty Rappaport, Jewish immigrants who founded a successful auto parts company that grew into NAPCO International.
160	Roosevelt Library		Standish	4026 28th Avenue S. 44°55′46.5″N 93°13′57″W	1997 (2000)	1924 branch library, one of 13 opened under the influential leadership of head librarian and American Library Association co-founder Gratia Countryman.
161	St. James African Methodist Episcopal (AME) Church Building		Howe	3600 Snelling Avenue; 44°56′15″N 93°13′43″W	2018	Church built 1958–59 for Minnesota's first Black congregation, established in 1860.
162	Sears, Roebuck and Co. Building		Midtown Phillips	2843 Elliot Avenue S. 44°56′57″N 93°15′39″W	2005 (2005)	Massive 1927 department store and warehouse designed by George C. Nimmons, reflecting Sears' storefront and mail-order expansion on the way to becoming a major U.S. retailer. Now the Midtown Exchange.
163	Second Church of Christ Scientist Tower		Downtown West	1115 2nd Avenue S. 44°58′17″N 93°16′22″W	1986	Unusual 1930 church building conceived by Omaha-based architect Thomas Rogers Kimball as an urban ziggurat. Now the IVY Hotel + Residences.
164	Semple House		Stevens Square	100–04 Franklin Avenue W. 44°57′46.7″N 93°16′47″W	2006 (1998)	Renaissance Revival mansion and carriage house built in 1901.
165	Sharei Zedeck Synagogue		Near North	1119 Morgan Avenue N. 44°59′22″N 93°18′17.5″W	1998	1936 synagogue emblematic of Hennepin County's Jewish population, which clustered in Near North from the 1880s to the 1960s. Became St. John's Missionary Baptist Church in 1969.
166	Shoreham Yards Roundhouse		Columbia Park	2800 Central Avenue NE	2000	1887 railway roundhouse expanded periodically through 1919; emblematic of the Minneapolis, St. Paul and Sault Ste. Marie Railroad and its significance to the Minneapolis flour milling industry and local employment. Demolished in 2019.
167	Shubert Theater		Downtown West	22 7th Street N. 44°58′46″N 93°16′24″W	1990 (1995)	High-class Beaux-Arts theater designed by specialist William Albert Swasey and built in 1910.
168	H. Alden Smith House		Loring Park	1403 Harmon Place; 44°58′21″N 93°16′56.5″W	1980 (1976)	1887 mansion noted for its exemplary Richardsonian Romanesque architecture by William Channing Whitney.
169	Lena O. Smith House		Bryant	3905 5th Avenue S. 44°55′55.6″N 93°16′7″W	1996 (1991)	Home 1925–1958 of Lena O. Smith, Minnesota's first Black female attorney, who advanced civil rights for Blacks in her law work and activism.
170	Snyder Mansion		Whittier	2118 Blaisdell Avenue; 44°57′40″N 93°16′48″W	2016	1913 mansion showcasing the work of architect Ernest Kennedy and the neighborhood's trend of mansions converting to institutional uses, in this case a nursing home in 1962 with a large addition.
171	Soo Line Building		Downtown West	105 5th Street S. 44°58′41″N 93°16′9″W	1996 (2008)	Renaissance Revival skyscraper, built 1914–15.
172	Spot Cafe		Elliot Park	615 10th Street S.	1983	Early example of a fast food restaurant, built 1932–33 in Art Deco style that telegraphed its presence. Demolished in 1996.
173	State Theater		Downtown West	805 Hennepin Avenue; 44°58′36″N 93°16′33″W	1986	Performing arts theater built 1920–21, noted for its Renaissance Revival architecture and innovative features such as an adjustable stage floor and the city's first air conditioning system.
174	Stebbins-Paulson House		Loring Park	325 15th Street W.	1987	1913 Prairie School house designed by Edward Somerby Stebbins, the first formally trained architect to practice in Minnesota. Demolished in 1987.
175	Stevens House		Hiawatha	4901 Minnehaha Avenue; 44°54′50″N 93°12′35″W	1983	First wood-frame house in Minneapolis built west of the Mississippi River; constructed in 1849 by the area's first authorized settler. Moved numerous times from its original location by St. Anthony Falls to its current site in Minnehaha Park.
176	Stewart Memorial Church		Lyndale	116 32nd Street E. 44°56′43″N 93°16′32″W	1984 (1978)	Rare example of a Prairie School church, designed by Purcell and Feick and built in 1909.
177	Sumner Library		Near North	611 Emerson Avenue N. 44°59′5″N 93°17′40.5″W	1984 (1977)	1915 Tudor Revival built with donations from the Andrew Carnegie Foundation to serve a Jewish immigrant neighborhood during a major expansion under the influential leadership of head librarian Gratia Countryman.
178	Swinford Townhouses and Apartments		Loring Park	1213–21, 1225 Hawthorne Avenue; 44°58′31″N 93°16′54″W	1980 (1990)	1886 townhouses and 1897 apartment building (the latter designed by Harry Wild Jones) commissioned by local entrepreneur and civic leader Anthony Kelly.
179	Thomas Lowry Memorial		East Isles	2330 Hennepin Avenue S. 44°57′34.5″N 93°17′39″W	2015	1915 memorial designed and built by Karl Bitter and other master craftsmen in memory of Thomas Lowry, head of the Twin City Rapid Transit Company, the streetcar system that helped shape Minneapolis.
180	Town Talk Diner		Longfellow	2707½ Lake Street E.	2013	Narrow 1946 diner significant for its Streamline Moderne exterior and as a rare local example of infill construction between two existing buildings. Destroyed by arson in 2020.
181	Turnblad House		Phillips West	2600 Park Avenue S. 44°57′19″N 93°15′57″W	1974 (1971)	Mansion noted for its Châteauesque architecture and association with Swedish American heritage; built 1903–10 for the owner of the nation's largest Swedish language newspaper and donated in 1929 to become the American Swedish Institute.
182	Uptown Theater		East Isles	2900 Hennepin Avenue; 44°56′56.5″N 93°17′55″W	1990	Art Moderne movie theater built in 1916 and renovated in 1939 after a fire.
183	Van Dusen Mansion		Stevens Square	1900 LaSalle Avenue S. 44°57′50.3″N 93°16′47″W	1995 (1995)	1893 Richardsonian Romanesque mansion designed by Edgar Eugene Joralemon for George W. Van Dusen, who developed one of the state's leading grain elevator networks.
184	Viehman House		Bryn Mawr	2006 Laurel Avenue W. 44°58′27.5″N 93°18′18.5″W	2012	1888 Queen Anne house inhabited 1905–1932 by a father and son who were leaders in the grain milling, realty, and automotive industries, and a grandson who was a radio producer and political campaign manager.
185	Wakefield House		Lynnhurst	4700 Fremont Avenue S. 44°55′3.3″N 93°17′46.5″W	1987	1912 house noted for its mix of American Craftsman and Prairie School design.
186	Walling House		Fulton	4850 West Lake Harriet Parkway; 44°54′56.5″N 93°18′39.5″W	1987	Exemplary Tudor Revival house, built in 1930.
187	Washburn Park Water Tower		Tangletown	401 Prospect Avenue; 44°54′38.7″N 93°17′3.5″W	1980 (1983)	Medieval Revival water tower built 1931–32 as a collaboration among architect Harry Wild Jones, engineer William S. Hewett, and sculptor John Karl Daniels.
188	Webster–Deinard House		Lowry Hill	1729 Morgan Avenue S. 44°58′0.7″N 93°18′15.3″W	2014	1924 Tudor Revival house designed by Liebenberg and Kaplan. Owned 1947–1985 by civil rights lawyer Amos Spencer Deinard, who hosted meetings of the city's groundbreaking employment discrimination commission here.
189	Wesley United Methodist Church		Loring Park	101 Grant Street E. 44°58′10.5″N 93°16′34″W	1983 (1984)	Richardsonian Romanesque church designed by Warren H. Hayes with an innovative layout and engineering features; built 1890–91.
190	West 15th Street Rowhouse		Loring Park	115–29 15th Street W. 44°58′3.3″N 93°16′49″W	1985	1886 Romanesque Revival rowhouse designed by Adam Lansing Dorr as the first multi-family residence in Loring Park.
191	White Castle Building		South Uptown	3252 Lyndale Avenue S. 44°56′35″N 93°17′18.4″W	1984 (1986)	1936 example of White Castle's distinctive prefabricated buildings and their pioneering architectural use of porcelain enameled steel.
192	Widstrom Tenement		Cedar-Riverside	617–21 19th Avenue S. 44°58′1.5″N 93°14′43.5″W	1985	One of the city's few surviving examples of late-19th-century Italianate architecture, built in 1886.
193	Willey House		Prospect Park	255 Bedford Street SE; 44°57′38″N 93°12′31″W	1984 (1984)	Small 1934 Prairie School house designed by Frank Lloyd Wright, leading to his affordable Usonian designs later in the decade.
194	Winton House		Lowry Hill	1324 Mount Curve Avenue; 44°58′3.3″N 93°17′50″W	1987	1910 Prairie School house designed by Chicago-based architect George W. Maher.
195	Wirth House		East Harriet	3954 Bryant Avenue S. 44°55′52″N 93°17′30″W	1998 (2002)	1910 house and office built for landscape architect Theodore Wirth, influential superintendent of the city's park system 1905–1935.
196	Woman's Club of Minneapolis		Loring Park	410 Oak Grove Street; 44°58′4″N 93°17′5″W	1998 (2022)	1927 Renaissance Revival clubhouse designed by Léon Eugène Arnal for the city's influential women's club, founded in 1907.
197	YMCA Central Building		Downtown West	36 9th Street S. 44°58′33.2″N 93°16′32″W	1996 (1995)	Distinctive Gothic Revival skyscraper, built 1917–19.
198	Young–Quinlan Department Store		Downtown West	901–915 Nicollet Mall; 44°58′28″N 93°16′25″W	1988	Chicago School/Renaissance Revival department store built in 1926 for the city's first ready-to-wear women's clothing retailer, founded in 1894.

== List of Minneapolis historic districts ==
#	Name	Image	Neighborhood	Location	Date (NRHP date)	Description
1	C.A. Smith Lumber Historic District		Camden Industrial	4400 block of Lyndale Avenue N. 45°2′9″N 93°17′17″W	2016	Factory and office buildings active 1892–1966, representing the city's late-stage lumber industry, later innovations to maximize scrap wood and produce composite material, and Camden's manufacturing heritage.
2	Church of the Incarnation Historic District		King Field	3800, 3801, and 3817 Pleasant Avenue S. 44°56′1″N 93°16′59″W	2018 (2022)	Renaissance/Romanesque Revival church designed by Emmanuel Louis Masqueray and built 1916–18 by H.N. Leighton; Colonial Revival rectory designed by Bertrand & Chamberlin and built 1912–13; and Art Moderne parochial school built 1934–35.
3	Dinkytown Commercial Historic District		Marcy-Holmes, University	Vicinity of 14th Avenue SE and 4th Street SE; 44°58′50″N 93°14′9″W	2015	Commercial district that grew 1899–1929 around a streetcar stop and the University of Minnesota.
4	Fifth Street Southeast Historic District		Marcy-Holmes	5th Street SE between 4th and 9th Avenue SE; 44°59′9.3″N 93°14′46″W	1976	Early residential neighborhood developed 1856–1942 with houses in popular styles by notable local architects and builders for prominent inhabitants.
5	Golden Valley Road Apartments Historic District		Willard-Hay	Golden Valley Road between Sheridan and Vincent Avenue N. 44°59′55.7″N 93°18′48″W	2015	Seven Spanish Colonial Revival and Tudor Revival apartment buildings designed 1927–29 by Perry Crosier along a streetcar line.
6	Harmon Place Historic District		Loring Park, Downtown West	Bounded by Yale Pl., 11th St. S., Hennepin Ave. and Spruce Pl. and by Harmon Pl., Maple St. and Hennepin Ave. 44°58′24″N 93°16′51″W	2001 (2026 partially)	Two-section district reflecting the burgeoning automobile industry with showrooms, service centers, and new apartment buildings constructed 1907–1930 as former residents moved away from downtown and commuted by car.
7	Healy Block Historic District		Central	Bounded by 2nd Ave. S., 31st St. E., 3rd Ave. S. and 32nd St. E. 44°56′45″N 93°16′25″W	1989 (1993)	Block of Queen Anne houses built 1886–98, the majority by master builder T.P. Healy.
8	Lowry Hill East Residential Historic District		Lowry Hill East	2400–2441 Colfax Ave., 2309–2444 Bryant Ave., 2316–2416 Aldrich Ave. S., and 811–911 24th St. W. 44°57′32″N 93°17′26″W	2015	Middle- and upper-class neighborhood spurred by streetcar access, with a cohesive set of popular architectural styles from 1882 to 1920 by notable local architects and builders.
9	Lynnhurst Residential Historic District		Lynnhurst	4600 & 4700 blocks of Fremont, Emerson, and the west side of Dupont Ave. S. 44°55′4″N 93°17′42″W	2020	Distinctive neighborhood of houses built in popular architectural styles 1893–1937 on large lots with park-like landscaping.
10	Mary Lochren Student Rooming Homes Historic District		Marcy-Holmes	1103 4th St. SE, 406 & 410 11th Ave. SE; 44°58′56.3″N 93°14′22.2″W	2021	Three adjacent houses designed by architect William Kenyon and built in 1901; long used as rental housing for University of Minnesota students.
11	Milwaukee Avenue Historic District		Seward	Milwaukee Ave. between Franklin Ave. and 24th St. E. 44°57′39″N 93°14′24″W	1975 (1974)	The city's first working-class planned community, comprising two blocks of small, turn-of-the-20th-century houses on a pedestrianized street.
12	Minneapolis Warehouse Historic District		North Loop, Downtown West	Roughly bounded by 1st Ave. N., 1st St. N., 10th Ave. N., and 6th St. N. 44°59′8″N 93°16′26″W	1978/2009 (1989)	Warehouse district reflecting the city's economic development 1865–1930 as a major regional distribution center, with numerous buildings designed by famous architects in the trendy styles of the era.
13	Minnehaha Historic District		Hiawatha	Generally bounded by Nawadaha Blvd., 39th Ave. S., 49th St., Hiawatha Ave., Minnehaha Ave., Minnehaha Creek, and the Mississippi River; 44°54′56″N 93°12′39″W	1986 (1969)	1889 park surrounding a waterfall popularized in literature; a longstanding visitor attraction noted for its urban planning and historic buildings such as the Minnehaha Depot, John Harrington Stevens House, and Longfellow House.
14	Ninth Street South Historic District		Elliot Park	Generally along 9th and 10th Sts. S. between Park and 5th Aves.; also along 14th and 16th Sts. E. 44°58′15″N 93°15′52″W	1988	Upper-class rowhouses and working-class apartment buildings designed in popular architectural styles 1886–1915 to accommodate a booming population attracted by the city's milling industry.
15	St. Anthony Falls Historic District		North Loop, Downtown West, Downtown East, Marcy-Holmes, Nicollet Island/East Bank, St. Anthony West	Generally bounded by Plymouth Ave. N., 2nd St. S., 10th Ave. S., 6th Ave. SE, and University Ave. 44°58′58″N 93°15′31″W	1971 (1971)	Industrial and commercial buildings, housing, bridges, and rail corridors clustered around the hydropower source around which Minneapolis grew 1848–1941, becoming the nation's largest flour milling center.
16	Stevens Square Historic District		Stevens Square	Generally bounded by 1st Ave. S., 17th St. E., 3rd Ave. S., Franklin Ave. E. 44°57′53″N 93°16′29″W	1989 (1993)	Dense neighborhood of brick apartment buildings primarily constructed 1910s–1920s to meet demand for affordable housing outside downtown.
17	Tilsenbilt Homes Historic District		Bryant, Field, Regina	Selected parcels on 4th and 5th Aves. S. between 39th and 47th Sts. E. 44°55′47″N 93°16′10″W	2017	28 scattered houses, constructed 1954–57 by Black realtor Archie Givens, Sr. and white builder Edward Tilsen, remaining from the city's first privately developed housing project open to all races, and one of the first in the nation to offer FHA insured loans to all races.
18	University of Minnesota Greek Letter Chapter House Historic District		Marcy-Holmes, University	University Ave. SE between 15th and 19th Aves. SE; selected parcels bounded by 10th and 12th Aves. SE, 4th St. SE, and University Ave. SE; 325 Harvard St. SE. 44°58′40″N 93°13′54″W	2003	Chapter houses reflecting the growth of University of Minnesota fraternities and sororities 1907–1936 and popular period revival styles of the time.
19	Washburn-Fair Oaks Historic District		Whittier	Generally bounded by Franklin Ave. E., 4th Ave. S., Interstate 35W, 26th St. E., and the alley between 1st Ave. S. and Nicollet Ave. S. 44°57′33″N 93°16′26″W	1976 (1977 fractionally)	Neighborhood established 1863–1939 by wealthy residents moving out of downtown, characterized by mansions in fashionable styles by prominent local architects, civic institutions they established like the Minneapolis Institute of Art, and later duplexes and apartment buildings.
20	Victory Memorial Drive Historic District		Cleveland, Victory, and Webber-Camden	Victory Memorial Dr. from Lowry Ave. to 45th Ave. N. to Humboldt Ave. N. 45°2′13″N 93°19′9″W	2003	Tree-lined drive established 1919–21 as World War I memorial, exemplifying early-20th-century parkways and spurring residential development in North Minneapolis and neighboring Robbinsdale.

== See also ==
- List of National Historic Landmarks in Minnesota
- National Register of Historic Places listings in Minnesota
