= Legg House =

Legg House may refer to:

in the United States

(by state then city)

- Legg House (Bloomington, Indiana), listed on the National Register of Historic Places (NRHP) in Monroe County
- Legg's Dependence, Stevensville, Maryland, NRHP-listed
- John Legg House, Worcester, Massachusetts, NRHP-listed
- Harry F. Legg House, Minneapolis, Minnesota, NRHP-listed
