= Fredrika Bremer Intermediate School =

- U.S. National Register of Historic Places
- Minneapolis Landmark
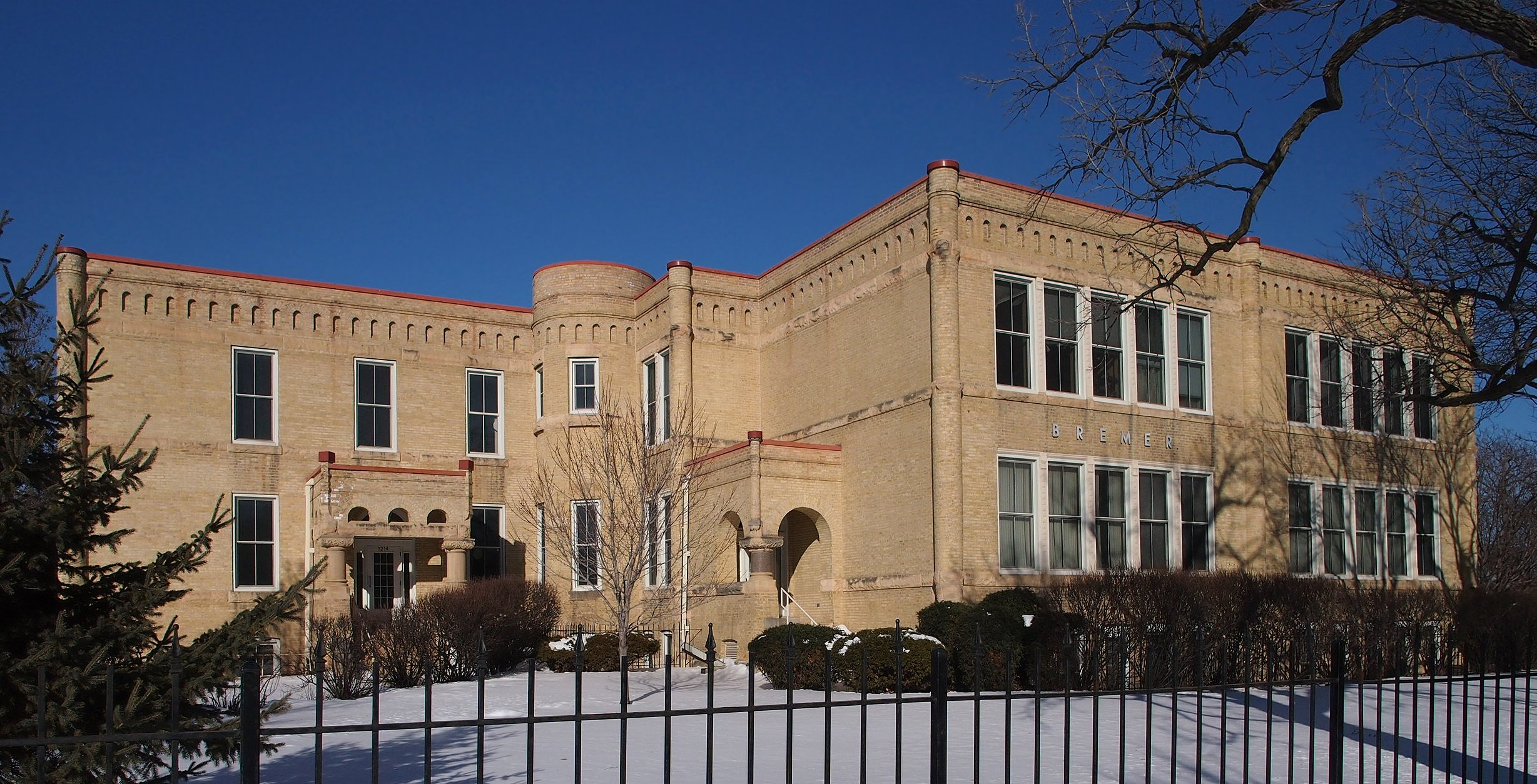
- Fredrika Bremer Intermediate School from the southwest

- Location within Minnesota Location within the United States
- Location: 1214 Lowry Avenue North, Minneapolis, Minnesota
- Coordinates: 45°0′48.5″N 93°17′42″W
- Area: 1 acre (0.40 ha)
- Built: 1886–7, 1897
- Architect: Edward S. Stebbens and Haschsbee
- Architectural style: Romanesque Revival
- NRHP reference No.: 78001536

Significant dates
- Added to NRHP: January 31, 1978
- Designated MPLSL: 1985

The Fredrika Bremer Intermediate School or Bremer School is a historic former school building in the Camden region of Minneapolis, Minnesota, United States. It is considered Minneapolis's oldest intact school building, whose original section was constructed 1886–87. It is listed on the National Register of Historic Places for its significance in architecture and education, representing the 19th-century emphasis on education through its castle-like design and its origin during a frenzy of construction by Minneapolis Public Schools.

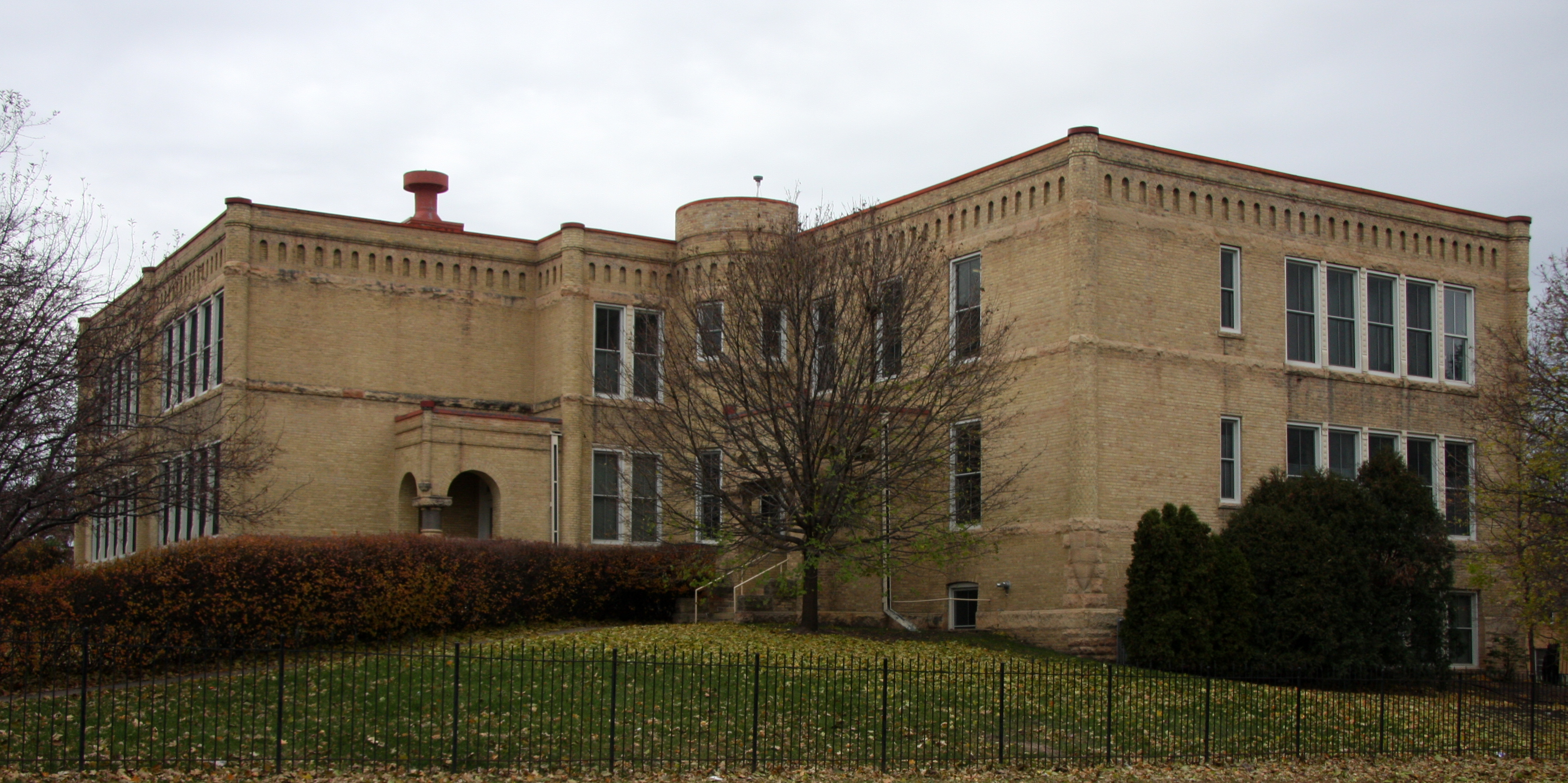
The building in 2013 from the southeast

Construction on Bremer School began in 1886, a period of rapid population expansion in Minneapolis. Initially the school housed grades 1–3 for 70 students. The school was nearly identical in design to two other Minneapolis schools, Calhoun School and Peabody School. The original structure had eight classrooms, but the building was expanded upon several times throughout its nearly 100-year life as a school. East and west wings were added on either side of the original section in 1897, and a gymnasium was added to the rear in 1910, joined by an addition to the northwest in 1916. The Folwell neighborhood building was constructed of light brick and limestone and featured several turrets and towers. Its namesake, Fredrika Bremer (1801–1865) was a Swedish novelist who traveled to Minnesota and wrote about women's rights. The building has now been converted for use as residential condominia.

== See also ==
- National Register of Historic Places listings in Hennepin County, Minnesota
