= Fire Station No. 19 =

Fire Station No. 19, and variations such as Engine House No. 19, may refer to:

- Fire Station No. 19 (Birmingham, Alabama)
- Fire Station 19 (Atlanta, Georgia)
- Fire Station No. 19 (Minneapolis, Minnesota)

== See also ==
- List of fire stations
