= Elizabeth C. Quinlan House =

Historic house in Minnesota, United States

Coordinates: 44°58′00.7″N 93°17′38.4″W

- U.S. National Register of Historic Places
- Minneapolis Landmark
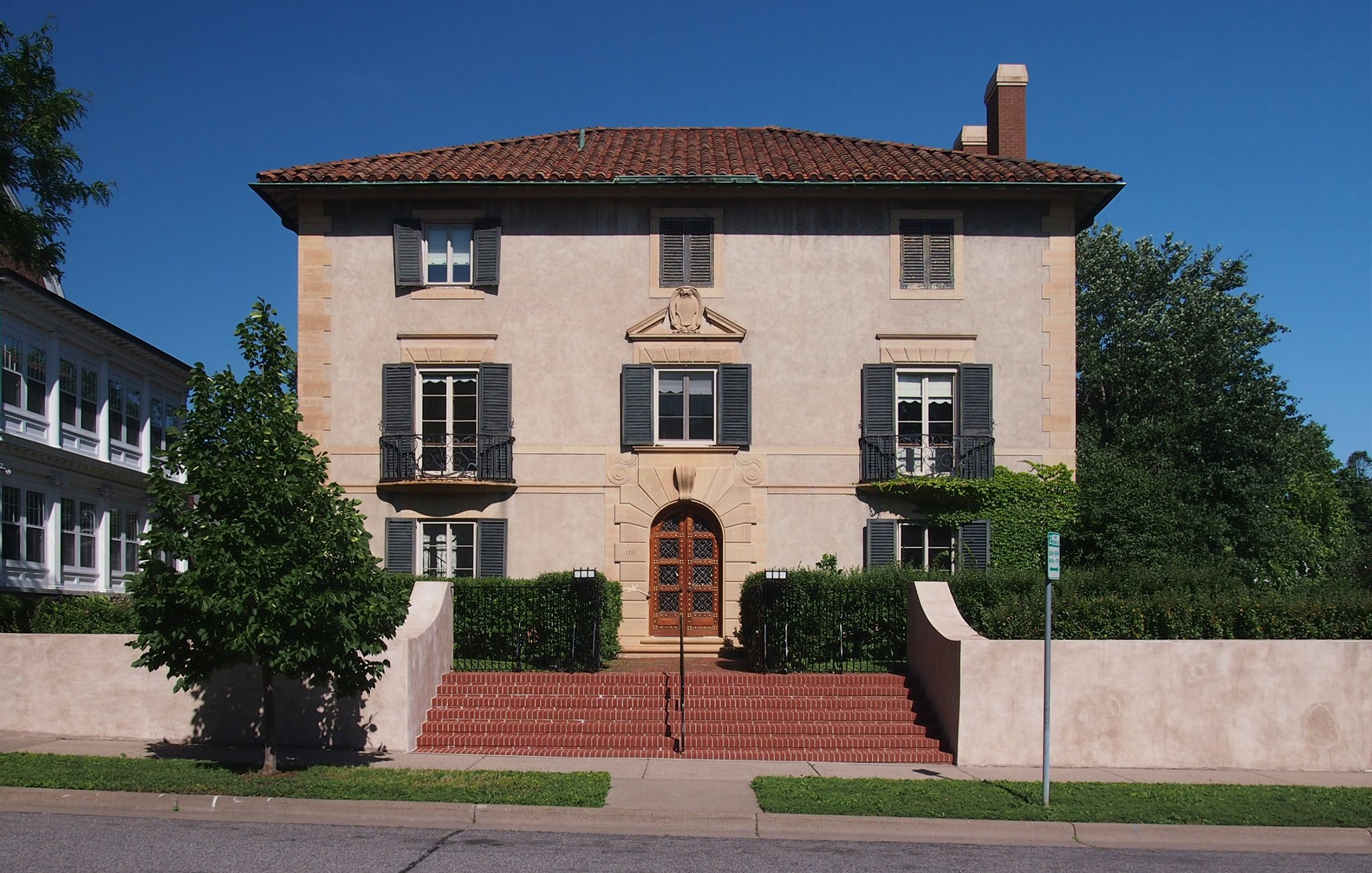
- Elizabeth C. Quinlan House, 2014

- Location within Minnesota Location within the United States
- Location: 1711 Emerson Ave S, Minneapolis, Minnesota
- Area: less than one acre
- Built: 1925
- Architect: Frederick L. Ackerman
- Architectural style: Renaissance Revival
- NRHP reference No.: 12000428

Significant dates
- Added to NRHP: July 25, 2012
- Designated MPLSL: 2010

The Elizabeth C. Quinlan House is a historic residence located in the Lowry Hill neighborhood of Minneapolis, Minnesota. Designed in an eclectic take on the Renaissance Revival style, it was built in 1925 by Frederick L. Ackerman for Elizabeth Quinlan. Quinlan had helped found one of the first women's clothing shops in Minneapolis in 1894 and had gone on to enjoy great success in the apparel business.

Built at a cost of $47,000 (equivalent to $882,961 in 2025), the L-shaped three story home features details such as stucco walls with quoining, terra cotta roofing and decorative ironwork (including work from Samuel Yellin). The home features architectural similarities to Quinlan's store, the Young–Quinlan Building, which was also designed by Ackerman in a similar style and completed one year later in 1926.

Quinlan lived in the home from 1925 until her death in 1947. The home was then passed on to her relatives and remains privately owned today. It was added to the National Register of Historic Places in 2012 as an excellent example of the 1920s eclectic architectural style and of Frederick Ackerman's work.
