= Station 28 Minneapolis Fire Department =

- U.S. National Register of Historic Places
- Minneapolis Landmark
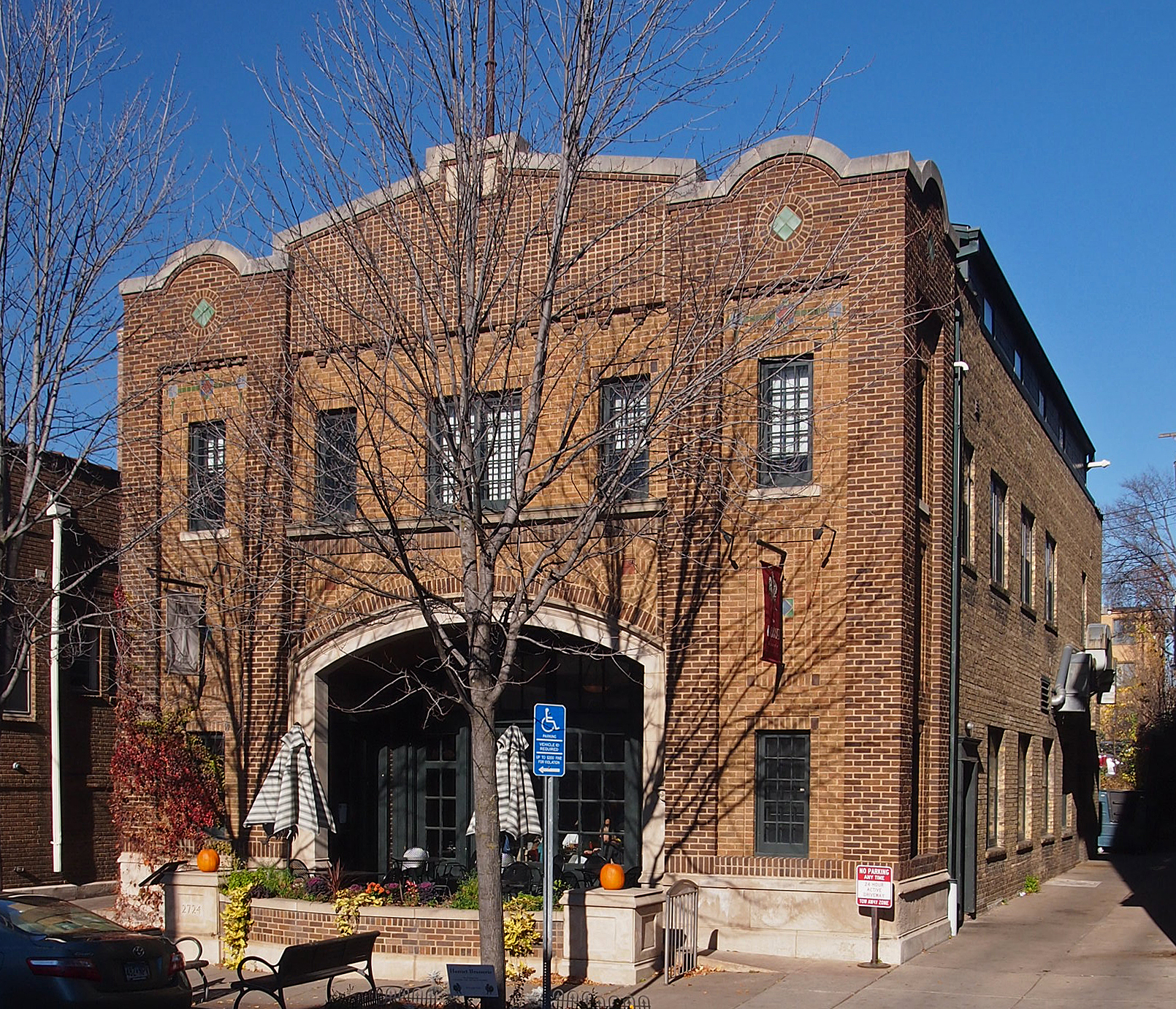
- Station 28 from the south

- Location within Minnesota Location within the United States
- Location: 2724 West 43rd Street, Minneapolis, Minnesota
- Coordinates: 44°55′29″N 93°18′48″W
- Built: 1914
- Architect: Harry T. Downs, Harold H. Eads
- NRHP reference No.: 93001235

Significant dates
- Added to NRHP: November 12, 1993
- Designated MPLSL: 1995

Station 28 of the Minneapolis Fire Department is a former fire station in the Linden Hills neighborhood of Minneapolis, Minnesota, United States. The station was built in 1914, during a time when the population of Minneapolis was growing rapidly. The Linden Hills neighborhood was evolving from a remote lakeside community to a neighborhood fully integrated into the city. This period of expansion also saw the construction of Lake Harriet Public School in 1898, city sewers in 1905, and Linden Hills Community Library in 1911.

The station was the second-to-last station originally built by the city, and it was the first to be designed solely for motorized equipment. The earlier horse-drawn rigs required more space and time, as well as upkeep for the horses. Motorized fire engines were less expensive and more efficient, and they were able to cover more territory with a decreased response time.

The building was listed on the National Register of Historic Places in 1993. The building has since been converted to office space, while Station 28 is now housed in a building at 2810 West 50th Street.

The street level of this building has been recently used as a restaurant space, and is currently occupied by the Harriet Brasserie.
