= Station 13 Minneapolis Fire Department =

- U.S. National Register of Historic Places
- Minneapolis Landmark
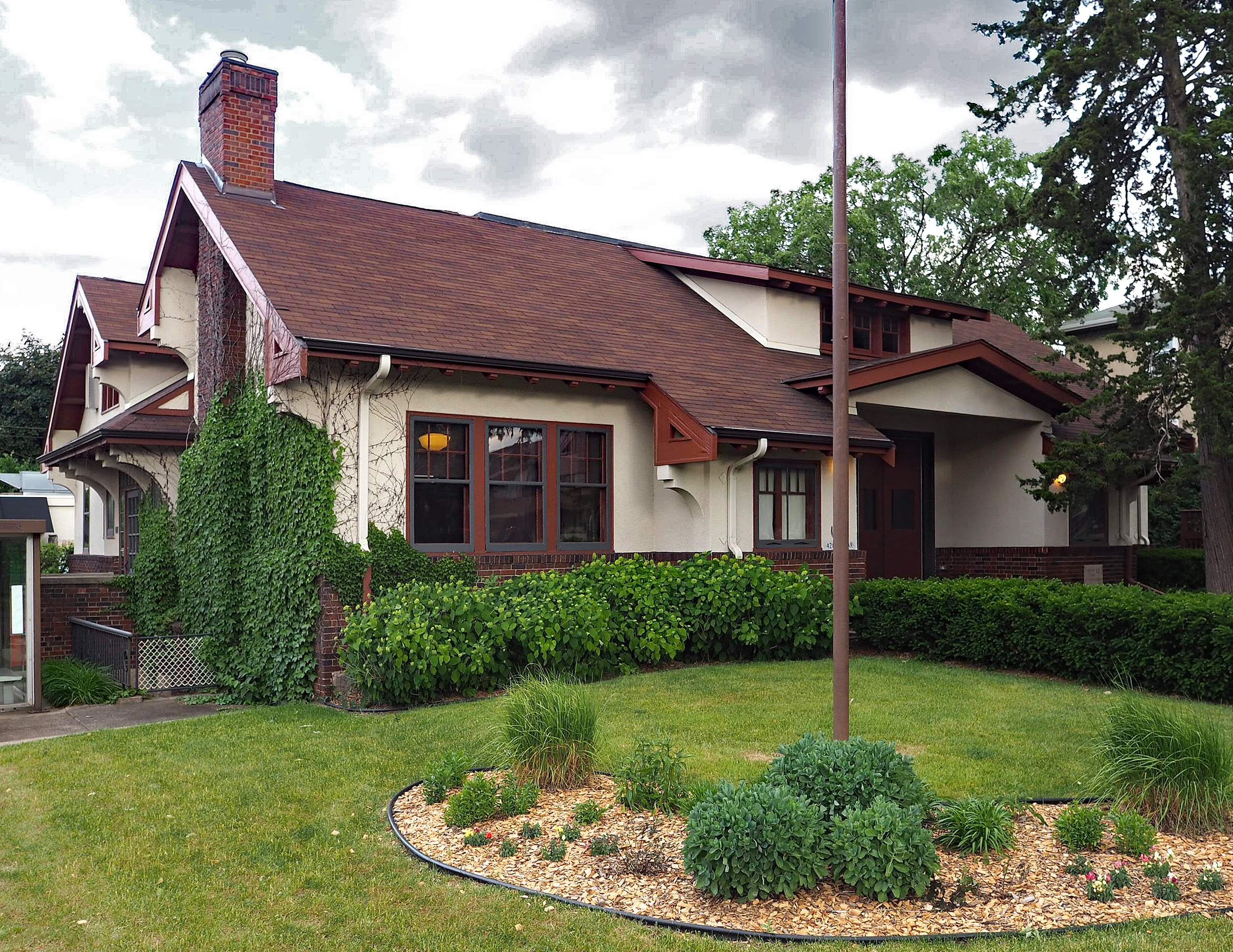
- Fire Station 13 from the northwest

- Location within Minnesota Location within the United States
- Location: 4201 Cedar Ave. S., Minneapolis, Minnesota
- Coordinates: 44°55′38″N 93°14′47″W
- Built: 1923
- Architect: Collins and Kennison
- Architectural style: Bungalow/Craftsman
- NRHP reference No.: 03001340

Significant dates
- Added to NRHP: December 23, 2003
- Designated MPLSL: 2003

Station 13 of the Minneapolis Fire Department is a fire station in the Ericsson neighborhood of Minneapolis, Minnesota. The station, at 4201 Cedar Ave. S., was built in 1923 during a period when the city was growing rapidly. Between 1919 and 1922, nearly 5,000 new homes had been built in Minneapolis, and city planners of that era were concerned about fire protection for buildings located near the city limits. That era saw other construction projects such as Roosevelt High School, built in 1922; Standish Elementary School, built in 1920; and Roosevelt Community Library, built in 1925.

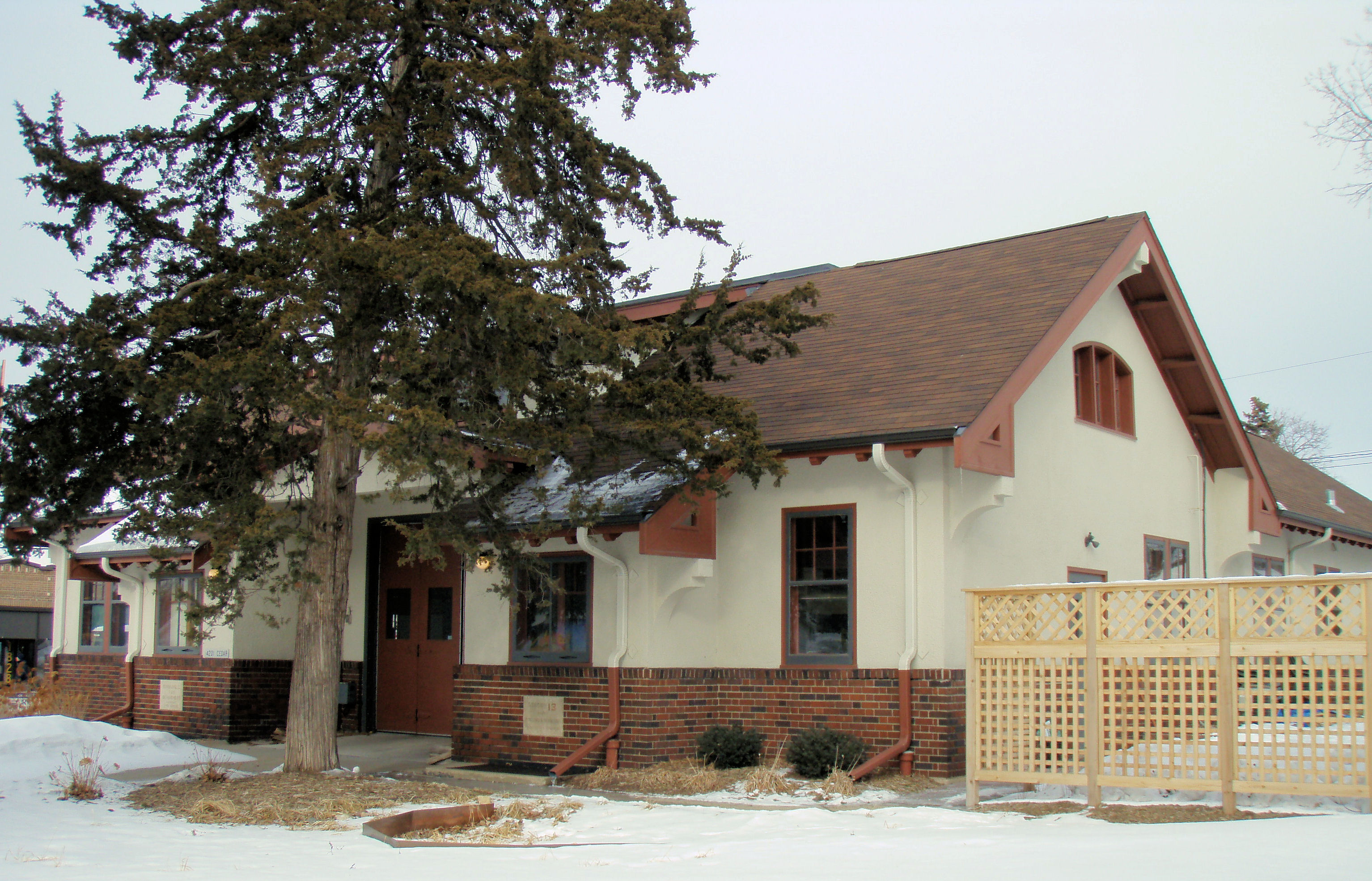
Minneapolis Fire Station 13 seen from Cedar Avenue in winter

The city wanted the station to blend into its surrounding residential area, so the building was designed in the American Craftsman bungalow style. It had a low, horizontal roof and a front yard, which distinguished it from other fire stations that typically had two stories and prominent entries. It served as a fire station until 1979, when the Minneapolis Fire Department initiated a remodeling and expansion program. It later held an emergency medical technician unit before being converted to offices. It was listed on the National Register of Historic Places in 2003.
