= Loren L. Chadwick Cottages =

Historic house in Minnesota, United States

- U.S. National Register of Historic Places
- Minneapolis Landmark
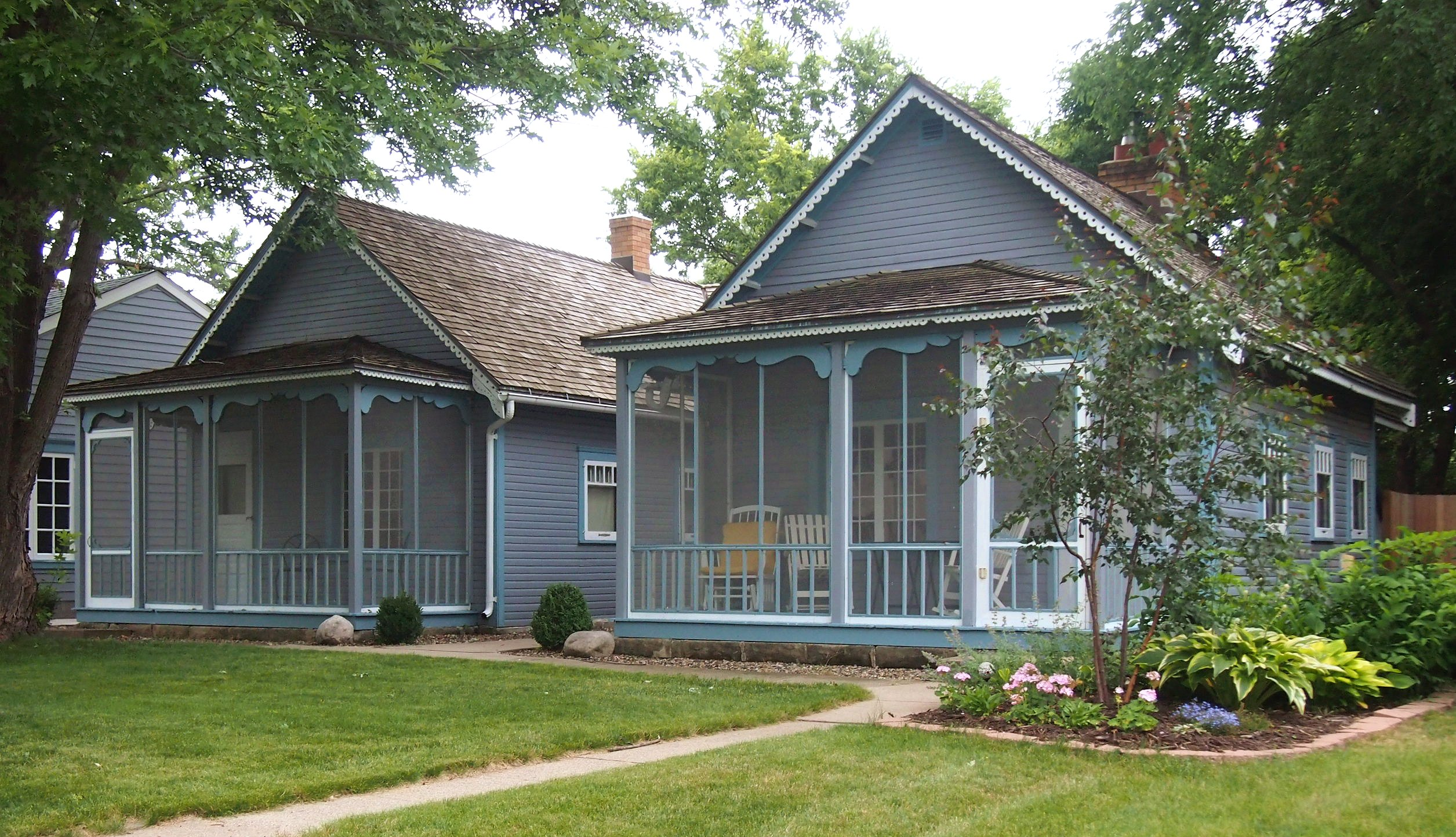
- The Loren L. Chadwick Cottages from the northwest

- Location within Minnesota Location within the United States
- Location: 2617 West 40th Street, Minneapolis, Minnesota
- Coordinates: 44°55′49″N 93°18′50″W
- Built: 1902
- Architect: Loren L. Chadwick
- NRHP reference No.: 84001417

Significant dates
- Added to NRHP: February 9, 1984
- Designated MPLSL: 1983

The Loren L. Chadwick Cottages are two cottages in the Linden Hills neighborhood of in Minneapolis, Minnesota, United States, situated roughly south of Bde Maka Ska and northwest of Lake Harriet. This area of Minneapolis was platted in 1882–83 as "Cottage City" by a local real estate developer, Louis F. Menage. He platted small 25 feet (7.6 m)-wide lots, as opposed to the normal lot width of 40 feet (12 m), in an effort to attract people who wanted to build summer lake cottages.

Loren L. Chadwick built these two cottages in 1902 at a cost of $300 each. They were small, measuring 16 feet (4.9 m) by 30 feet (9.1 m), and had screened porches to take advantage of summer breezes from the nearby lakes. The two cottages were rented out as summer homes for more than a decade before they were bought by individual owners. In 1972, a new owner joined the two cottages with an addition on the rear. The cottages were listed on the National Register of Historic Places in 1984. They are significant because although their design is simple, their survival demonstrates a good example of cottage architecture in Minneapolis. Despite their simplicity, the cottages have Carpenter Gothic detailing on the vergeboards of their gable and porch roofs.
