= Lawrence A. and Mary Fournier House =

United States historic place

- U.S. National Register of Historic Places
- Minneapolis Landmark
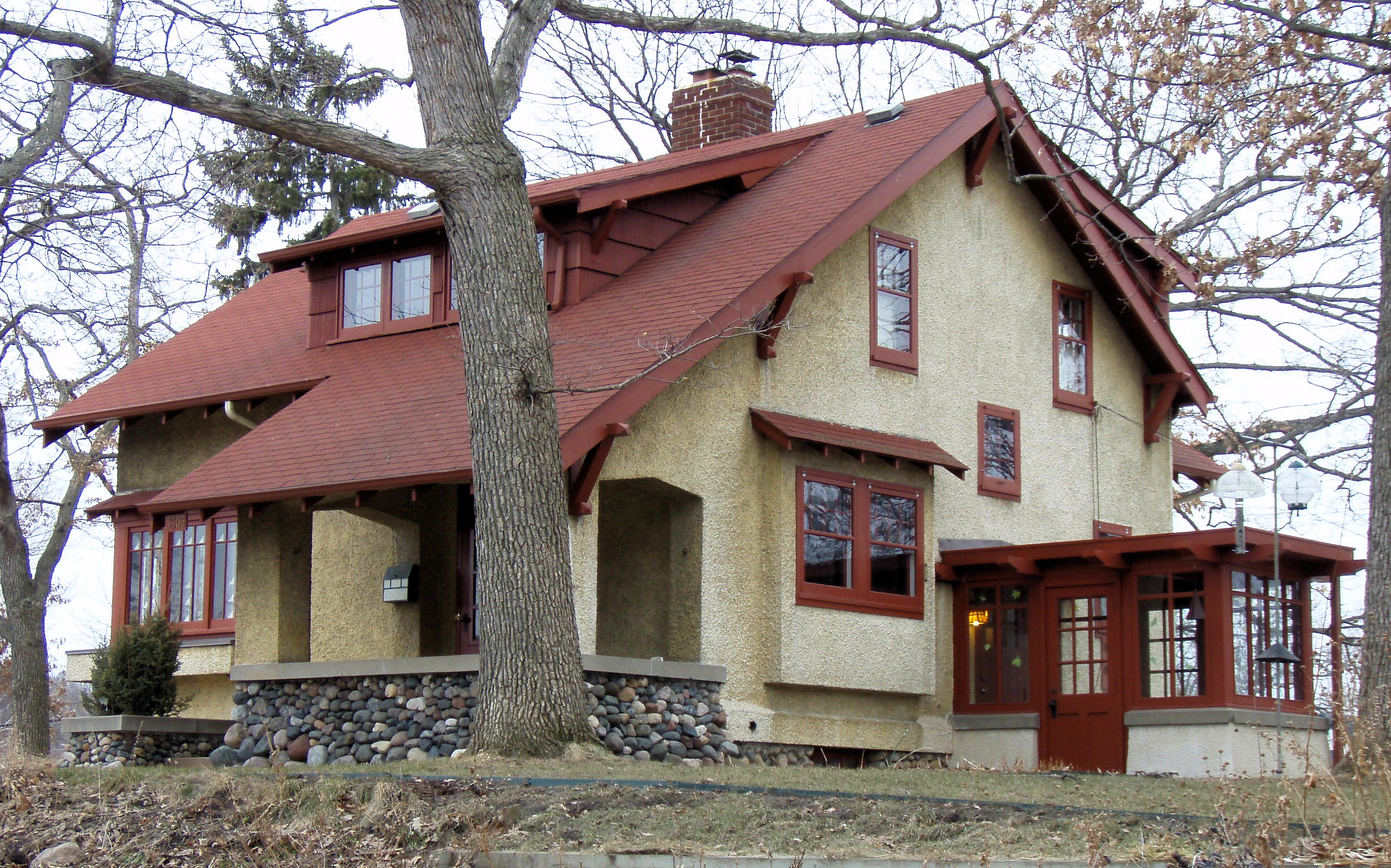
- The Fournier House from the northeast

- Location within Minnesota Location within the United States
- Location: 3505 Sheridan Avenue North, Minneapolis, Minnesota
- Coordinates: 45°1′8″N 93°18′44.5″W
- Area: Less than one acre
- Built: 1910
- Architect: Lawrence A. Fournier
- Architectural style: Bungalow/Craftsman, Prairie School
- NRHP reference No.: 95000618

Significant dates
- Designated: May 18, 1995
- Designated MPLSL: 1995

The Lawrence A. and Mary Fournier House is a historic bungalow in the Cleveland neighborhood of Minneapolis, built in 1910. It was designed by architect Lawrence Fournier as a home for himself and his family. It blends early Prairie School-style elements with American Craftsman architecture. It was also one of the first houses built in North Minneapolis.

The Fournier House was listed on the National Register of Historic Places in 1995 for having local significance in the theme of architecture/engineering. It was nominated for representing the emergence of Prairie School style within the more established Arts and Crafts movement.

== Setting ==
In 1908 Lawrence Fournier and his wife Mary purchased a lot in what is now the Cleveland neighborhood in North Minneapolis. The Fourniers' selection of a North Minneapolis lot reveals the increasing appeal of this area of the city to new residents. Minneapolis real estate developers had begun to promote the area's bucolic setting and its easy access to new streetcar lines.

As the automobile became more popular and dependable after World War I, development increased at an even more rapid rate. The Cleveland neighborhood was unusually slow to develop, however, and the Fournier House was set in a rural atmosphere until a post-World War II building boom filled in many of the neighborhood's remaining lots.

== Design ==
Fournier was an architect at the famous firm of Purcell & Elmslie. It became the second-most-commissioned firm of the Prairie School, after Frank Lloyd Wright. However, Fournier's work on the home two years prior to joining the firm shows the influence he had on William Gray Purcell and George Grant Elmslie. Steeped in knowledge of architectural styles, Fournier created a unique concept for the home. Mary Fournier was an artist and also influenced its design. The house the couple built exemplified the common ground between the Craftsman and Prairie Schools.

For most of the exterior detailing, Fournier selected the Craftsman style, with its broad, sloping roof pierced by shed dormers. He also created wide, unenclosed eaves, exposed rafter tails, and exposed roof beams supported by knee braces. With a Craftsman sense of economy, he eliminated the vestibule. Instead a sheltered partial-width front porch was built. Fournier used the Craftsman device of an elevated dining room window grouping with space under the windows for closets.

Prairie School traits appear within the Craftsman context, creating a mingling of the two styles. For example, a formal Prairie pedestal urn is given an informal Craftsman covering of rustic fieldstones. A Prairie-style band rides the perimeter of the foundation but fails to create much of a horizontal accent on a compact bungalow form. A more successful stylistic blend is found in a Craftsman window box given a Prairie flair as it wraps around a comer-set casement window group.

In his choice of materials, Fournier demonstrated concern for a smooth transition between the house and its setting. This concern for landscape was shared by both Prairie and Craftsman designers. The strong fieldstone foundation and rough cast stucco are more in keeping with the Craftsman School. However Fournier included sidewalks of smooth, rose-colored concrete—a trait of the Prairie School.

While at Purcell and Elmslie, Fournier served as the firm's expert in the latest domestic engineering gadgetry of the period. He used this knowledge in his own home, designing a central vacuum cleaner, laundry chute, galley kitchen, and rainwater filtration system.

== Influence ==
The number of Prairie details in the Fournier house reflects the growing prominence of the Prairie School in 1910. Many of the Prairie elements Fournier experimented with in designing his own home appear with increasing frequency in the subsequent work of Purcell and Elmslie.

== History ==
Lawrence and Mary Fournier lived in the house until 1917, when Lawrence was transferred to Purcell and Elmslie's Chicago office. From 1917 to 1961 the house remained within a single family. Since 1961 there have been several owners. In 1995 the Fournier House was added to the National Register of Historic Places for its expression of high-style house architecture.

== See also ==
- National Register of Historic Places listings in Hennepin County, Minnesota
