= Ogden Apartment Hotel =

- U.S. National Register of Historic Places
- Minneapolis Landmark
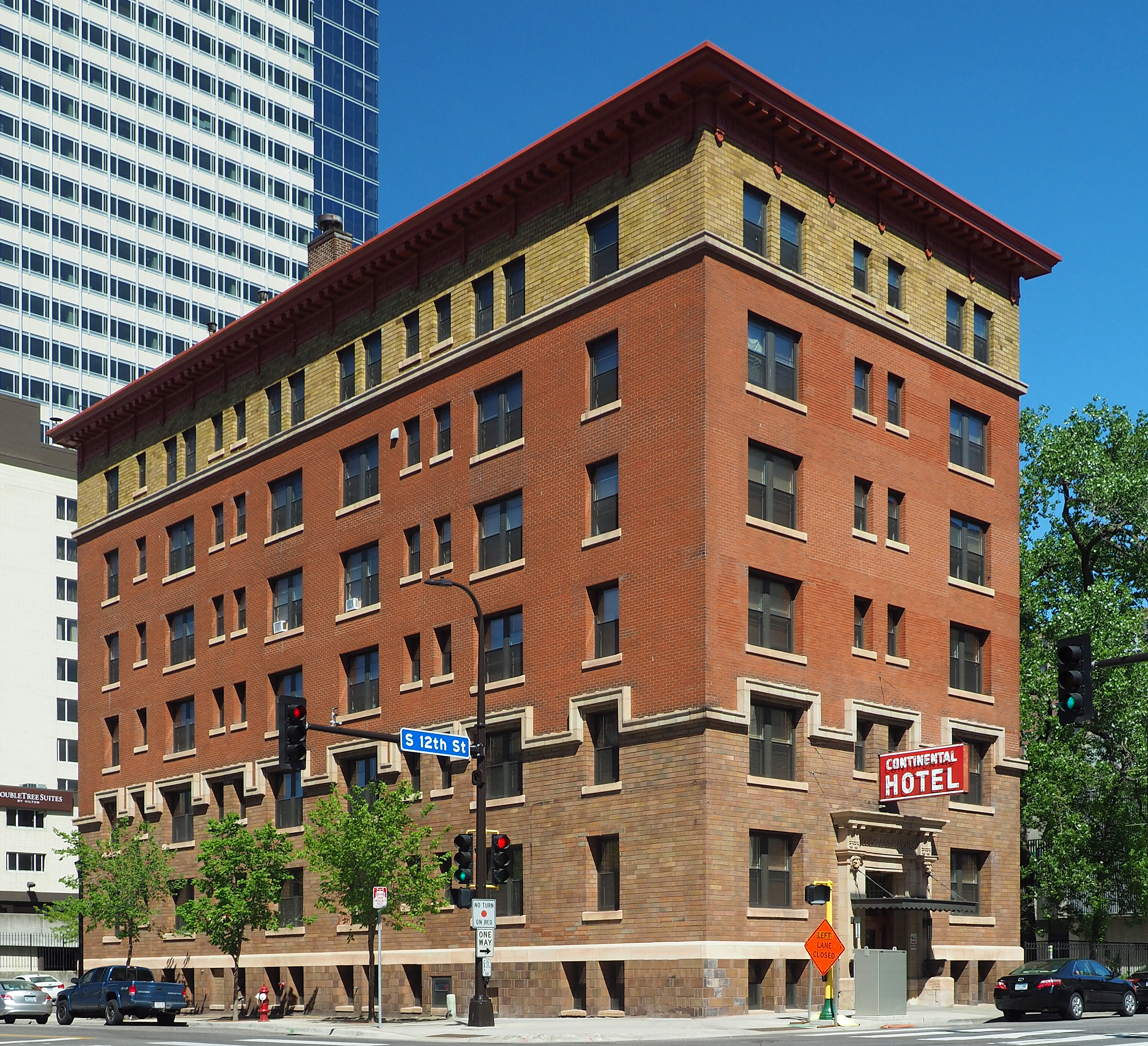
- The Ogden Apartment Hotel from the west

- Location within Minnesota Location within the United States
- Location: 66–68 S. 12th Street, Minneapolis, Minnesota
- Coordinates: 44°58′22″N 93°16′38″W
- Built: 1910
- Architect: Adam Lansing Dorr, Ingemann Brothers
- Architectural style: Late 19th And 20th Century Revivals
- NRHP reference No.: 91001956

Significant dates
- Added to NRHP: January 13, 1992
- Designated MPLSL: 1992

The Ogden Apartment Hotel is an apartment building in the Downtown West neighborhood of Minneapolis, Minnesota, United States. The building was designed for middle class worker housing when demand for such housing was increasing around the beginning of the 20th century. It was billed as an "apartment hotel", a design briefly popular in Minneapolis. The individual units did not have their own separate kitchens; instead, residents ate from a common restaurant in the building. The building was designed primarily to appeal to single men and women, as well as married couples without children. It included modern conveniences (for the time) such as private bathrooms, Murphy beds, and electric appliances.

The building changed its name to the Continental Hotel in 1948. It was listed on the National Register of Historic Places in 1992 as the last remaining single room occupancy residential structure in Minneapolis. The building was purchased by the Central Community Housing Trust, now known as Aeon, in 1992. At the time, it had only a few residents, some who had lived there as long as 34 years, and the roof was deteriorating. Aeon rehabilitated the building, which now houses 70 residents who were formerly homeless. The staff provides support services, classes, and workshops for its residents. The renovation earned two awards: the "Neighborhood Environment Award" in 1993 from the City of Minneapolis Committee on Urban Environment (CUE), and the Minneapolis Heritage Preservation Commission Award in 1995.
