= Elisha and Lizzie Morse Jr. House =

Historic house in Minnesota, United States

- U.S. National Register of Historic Places
- Minneapolis Landmark
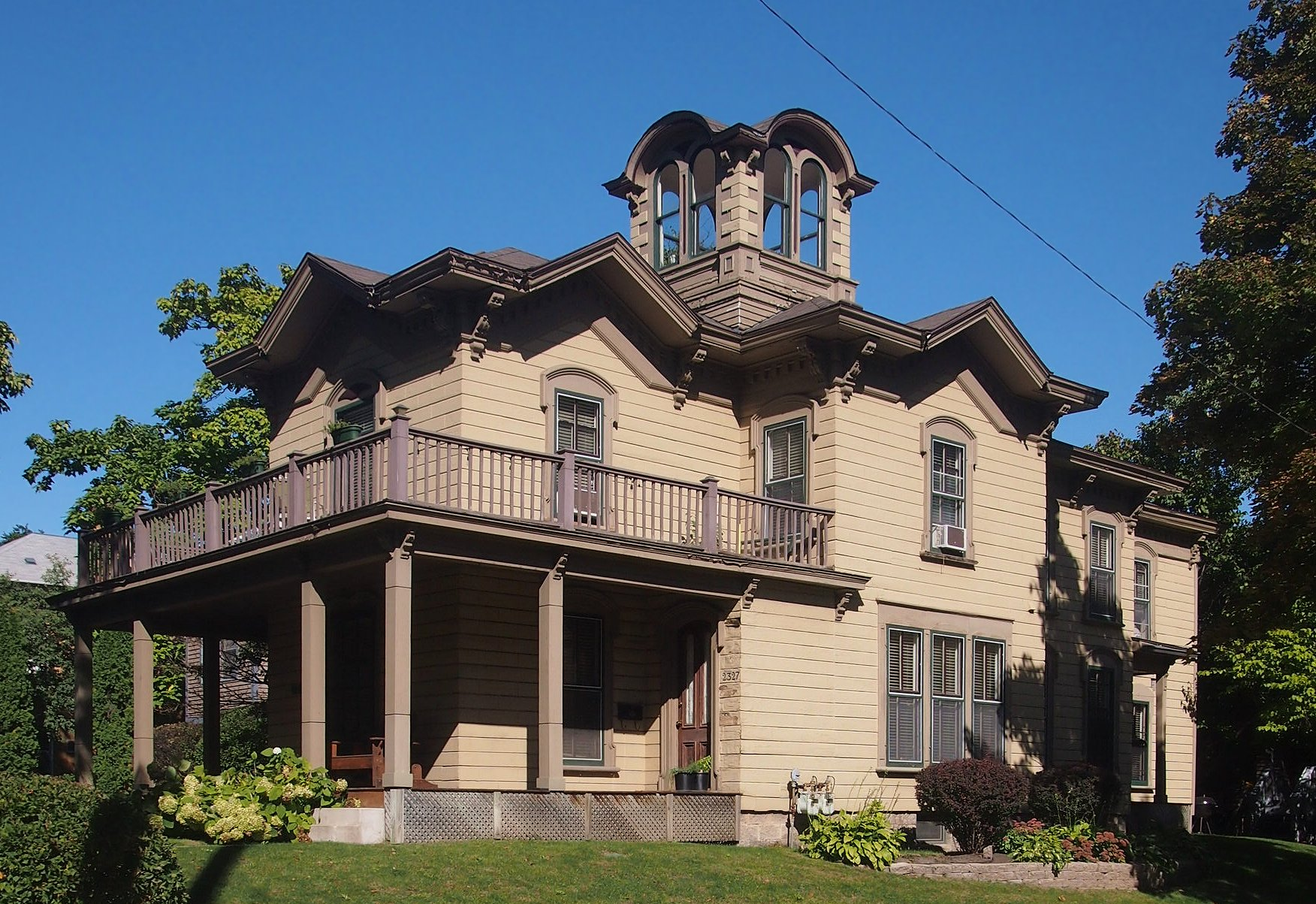
- The Morse House from the southwest

- Location within Minnesota Location within the United States
- Location: 2325–2327 Pillsbury Avenue S., Minneapolis, Minnesota
- Coordinates: 44°57′33.4″N 93°16′51.5″W
- Built: 1874
- Architectural style: Italian Villa
- NRHP reference No.: 76001057

Significant dates
- Added to NRHP: July 28, 1995
- Designated MPLSL: 1974

The Elisha and Lizzie Morse Jr. House is a house in the Whittier neighborhood of Minneapolis, Minnesota, United States, listed on the National Register of Historic Places. The house was built in 1870 in the Italian Villa style. Its most distinctive feature is the cupola with shallow arches over paired windows. The siding is also a unique design. The planks were made to look like cut stone by cutting incisions at regular intervals, then painting the siding with a mixture of paint and sand. This technique was rarely practiced in Minnesota architecture, and there are few surviving buildings with this treatment.

The house was originally located at 2402 4th Avenue South and was built for grocer Elisha Morse, Jr. and his family as a country home. It was moved to its present location in 1991. Its previous location was radically altered around 1966 during the construction of Interstate 35W, so its current location is more like the original neighborhood on 4th Avenue South.
