= Floyd B. Olson House =

Historic house in Minnesota, United States

- U.S. National Register of Historic Places
- Minneapolis Landmark
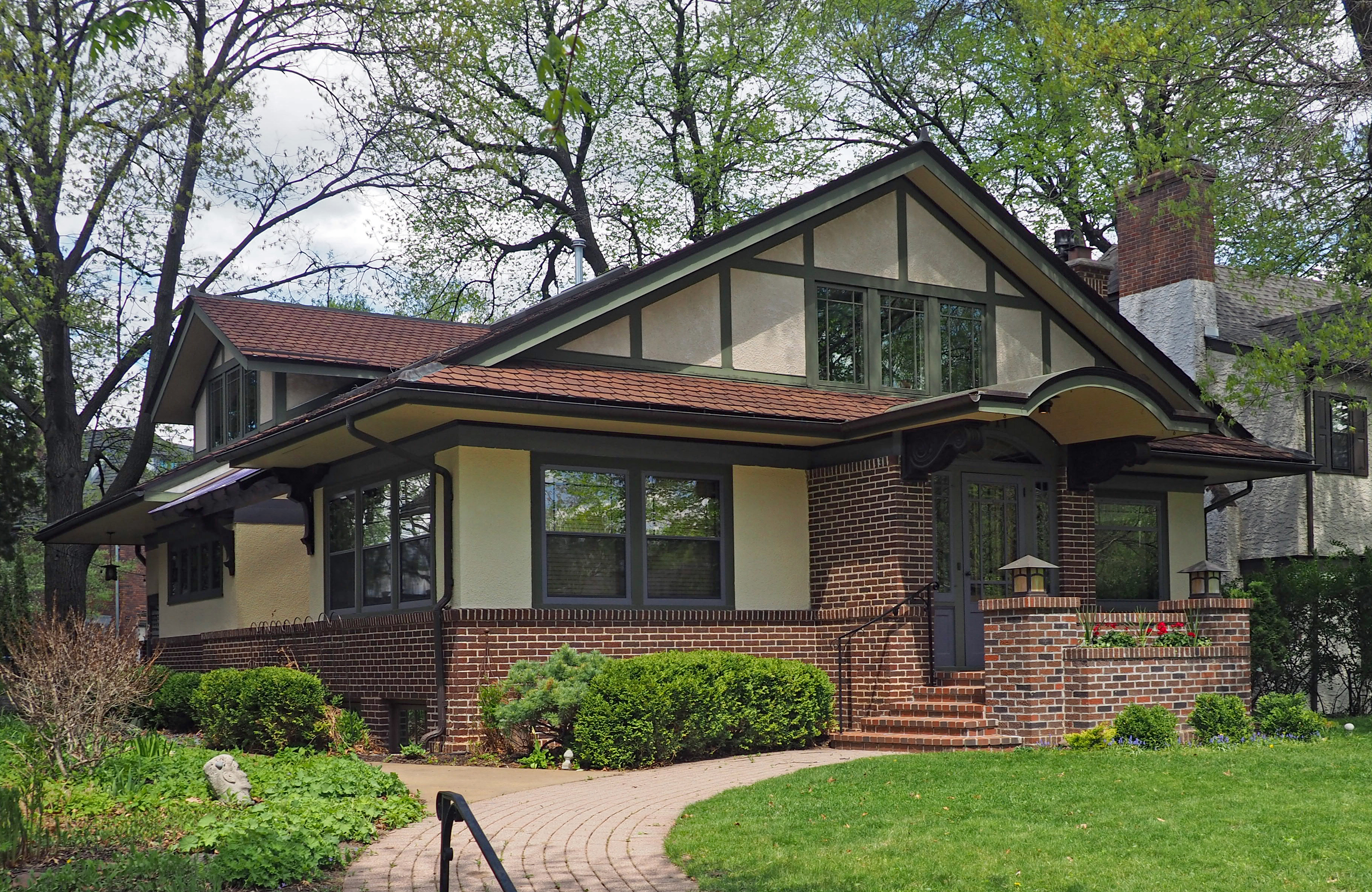
- The Floyd B. Olson House viewed from the southwest

- Location within Minnesota Location within the United States
- Location: 1914 W. 49th Street, Minneapolis, Minnesota
- Coordinates: 44°54′52″N 93°18′14″W
- Area: less than one acre
- Built: 1922
- Architectural style: Bungalow/Craftsman
- NRHP reference No.: 74001023

Significant dates
- Added to NRHP: December 31, 1974
- Designated MPLSL: 1986

The Floyd B. Olson House is a historic house located at 1914 West 49th Street in Minneapolis, Minnesota. It was listed on the National Register of Historic Places on December 31, 1974.

== Description and history ==
It was originally the residence of Floyd B. Olson, who was Minnesota Farmer-Labor Party governor from 1931 to 1936. It is a bungalow with an unusual ornamental feature: it has two classically inspired pillars that support an arched roof over the entrance.
