= Harry F. Legg House =

Historic house in Minnesota, United States

- U.S. National Register of Historic Places
- Minneapolis Landmark
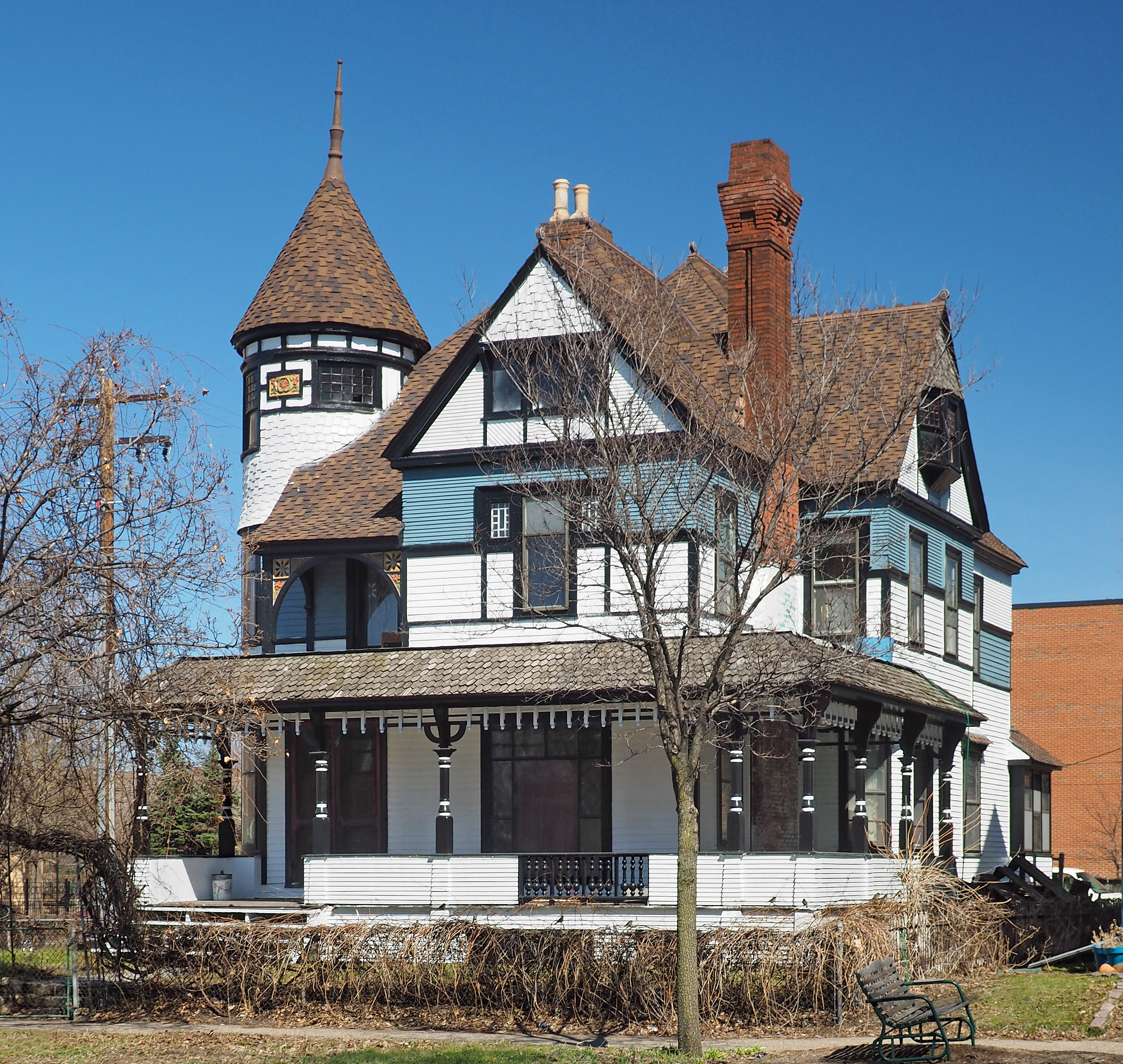
- The Harry F. Legg House from the southwest

- Location within Minnesota Location within the United States
- Location: 1601 Park Avenue, Minneapolis, Minnesota
- Coordinates: 44°58′1″N 93°15′52″W
- Built: 1887
- Architect: Hoit, George H., & Co.
- Architectural style: Queen Anne
- NRHP reference No.: 76001061

Significant dates
- Added to NRHP: June 3, 1976
- Designated MPLSL: 1984

The Harry F. Legg House is a house in the Elliot Park neighborhood of Minneapolis, Minnesota, United States. The house appears to have been built by a tract housing developer, and its style reflects that of houses for middle to upper-class professional families in the late 19th century. The 1887 house retains its Queen Anne architectural integrity, having been altered little since it was originally built. The interior woodwork may have come from "made to order" catalogs that were circulating around that time. The house is listed on the National Register of Historic Places.

Harry Legg and his wife Dora owned a jewelry store in downtown Minneapolis on the corner of Nicollet Avenue and Fourth Street.
