= Cleveland, Minneapolis =

Neighborhood in the Camden community in Minneapolis

Coordinates: 45.0196°N 93.3139°W

Cleveland
- Neighborhood
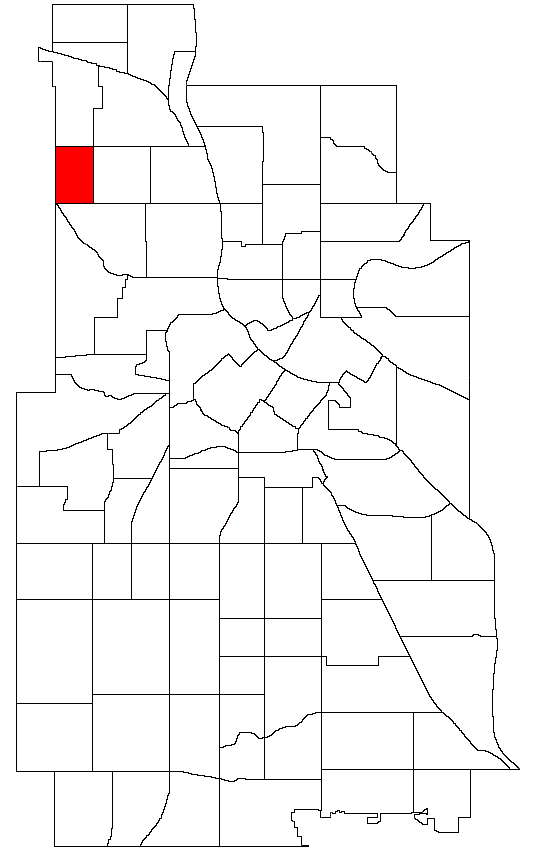
- Location of Cleveland within the U.S. city of Minneapolis
- Interactive map of Cleveland
- Country: United States
- State: Minnesota
- County: Hennepin
- City: Minneapolis
- Community: Camden
- Founded: 1849
- City Council Ward: 4

Government
  - Council Member: LaTrisha Vetaw

Area
  - Total: 0.374 sq mi (0.97 km^{2})

Population (2020)
  - Total: 3,139
  - Density: 8,390/sq mi (3,240/km^{2})
- Time zone: UTC-6 (CST)
  - Summer (DST): UTC-5 (CDT)
- ZIP code: 55411, 55412
- Area code: 612
- Website: www.clevelandneighborhood.org

Historical population
Census	Pop.	Note	%±
1980	3,220		—
1990	3,216		−0.1%
2000	3,440		7.0%
2010	3,025		−12.1%
2020	3,139		3.8%

Cleveland is a neighborhood in the Camden community in Minneapolis. It is located in Ward 4, represented by council member LaTrisha Vetaw. Its boundaries are Dowling Avenue to the north, Penn Avenue North to the east, Lowry Avenue north to the south, and Xerxes Avenue North to the west. To the west of Xerxes Avenue is the suburb of Robbinsdale.

Some people believe that the neighborhood is named after former United States President Grover Cleveland, while others maintain it is named after Horace Cleveland, a landscape architect who framed the development of the Minneapolis Park System in the 1880s.

It contains the Fournier House.

== Demographics ==
Race/ethnicity
Race/ethnicity	2000		2010		2020	
Race/ethnicity	Number	%	Number	%	Number	%
White alone	1,764	51.28	1,528	50.51	1,441	45.91
Black alone	1,028	29.88	878	29.02	849	27.05
Hispanic or Latino (any race)	109	3.17	206	6.81	351	11.18
Native American alone	46	1.34	36	1.19	48	1.53
Asian alone	343	9.97	226	7.47	189	6.02
Other race alone	8	0.23	10	0.33	9	0.29
Pacific Islander alone	0	0.00	1	0.03	5	0.16
Two or more races	142	4.13	140	4.63	247	7.87
Total	3,440	100.0	3,025	100.0	3,139	100.0
