= Fire Station No. 19 (Minneapolis, Minnesota) =

- U.S. National Register of Historic Places
- Minneapolis Landmark
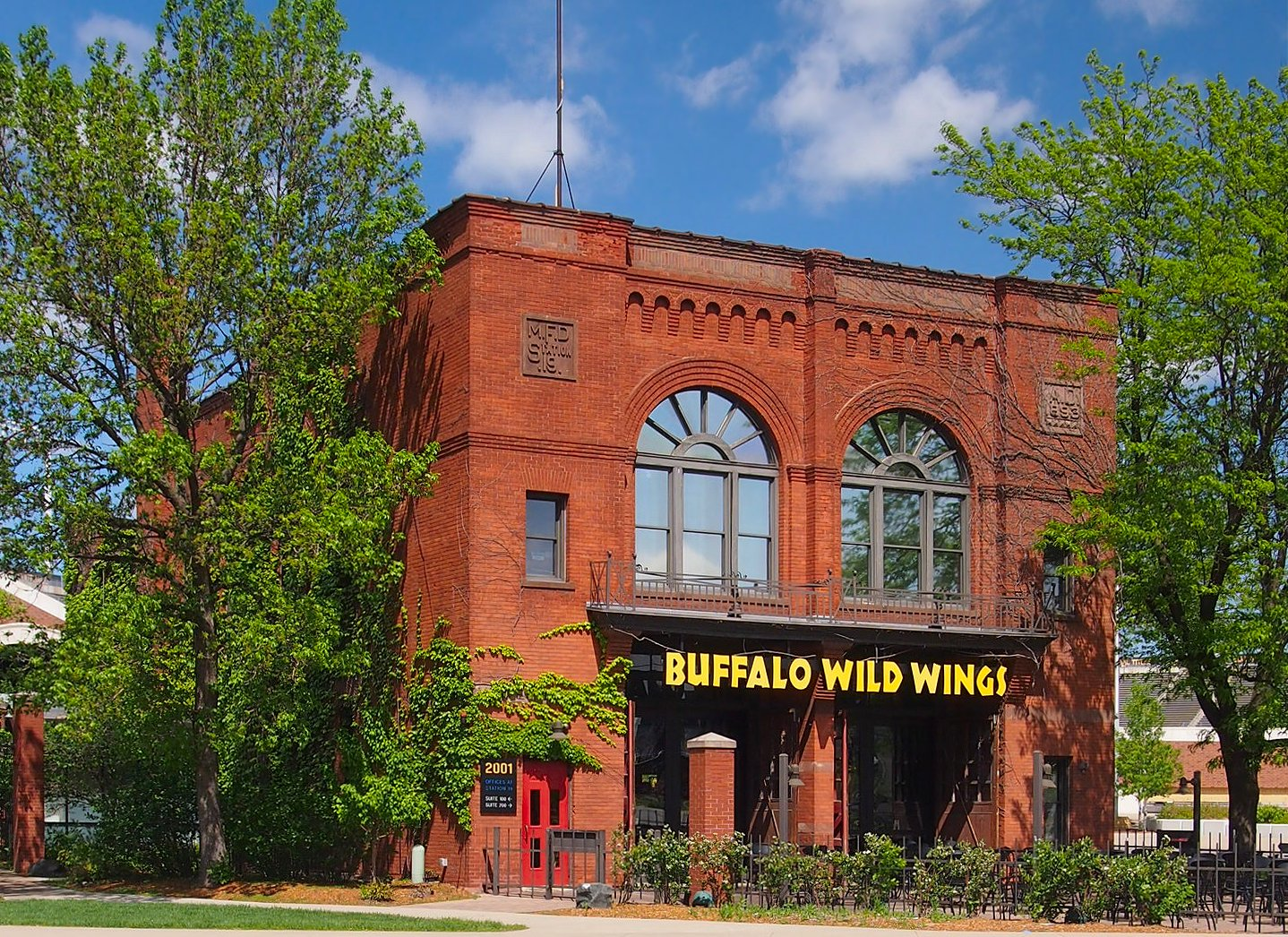
- The former Fire Station No. 19 from the southwest

- Location within Minnesota Location within the United States
- Location: Minneapolis, Minnesota
- Coordinates: 44°58′35″N 93°13′35″W
- Built: 1893
- Architect: Minneapolis Public Works
- Architectural style: Minneapolis Horse Drawn Series
- NRHP reference No.: 82002960

Significant dates
- Added to NRHP: January 14, 1982
- Designated MPLSL: 1982

Fire Station No. 19, now the site of a Buffalo Wild Wings, and the architectural firm Station 19 Architects in Minneapolis, Minnesota, United States is centered in the University of Minnesota, Minneapolis campus. The former Fire Station is listed on the National Register of Historic Places. It was built in 1893 in an era when Minneapolis was growing rapidly. Rapid development was bringing prosperity to Minneapolis, but it was also starting to tax the city's infrastructure. Residents and businesses on the east bank of the Mississippi River were demanding better fire protection, especially after the fire that consumed the University of Minnesota Old Main building in 1892 along with some grain elevators nearby. Fire Station No. 19 was built in a simple utilitarian style (unique to Minneapolis), yet it contained some touches of ornamentation. It was built with a bell tower that was later removed. The fire station was one of the last to house horse-drawn equipment, as late as 1922, it also had a hardwood floor apparatus bay. A newer Fire Station 19 was occupied in 1976 one block to the south.

Besides its role as a firehouse, Historic Fire Station No. 19 was also the birthplace of kittenball, a variant of softball. Louis Rober, a lieutenant at the fire station between 1896 and 1906, adapted the rules of baseball to create a game that would use less space, time, and equipment than a regular baseball game. He created the game so firefighters could get exercise while waiting for a fire alarm. Early teams included the "Kittens" of Engine Company 19, "Rats" of Engine Company 9, "Whales" of Engine Company 4, "Salisburys" from a mattress factory, "Pillsburys" from nearby flour mills, and the "Central Avenues". By 1906, more than 20 teams were playing in summer leagues.

The building was acquired in 1977 by local architects who turned the building into offices under the name Station 19 Architects. The firm primarily creates designs for churches in Minnesota.

There was some concern in the mid-2000s decade that the University of Minnesota would have the structure demolished to make way for rearranged roads leading to and from the then-unbuilt TCF Bank Stadium. The university made offers to purchase the property into early 2006, and the building owners worried that the property would be seized through eminent domain. However, the roads were eventually routed around the building, making it the only structure on a small island across from the stadium.
