= Young–Quinlan Building =

Building in Minneapolis, Minnesota, U.S.

Young–Quinlan Department Store
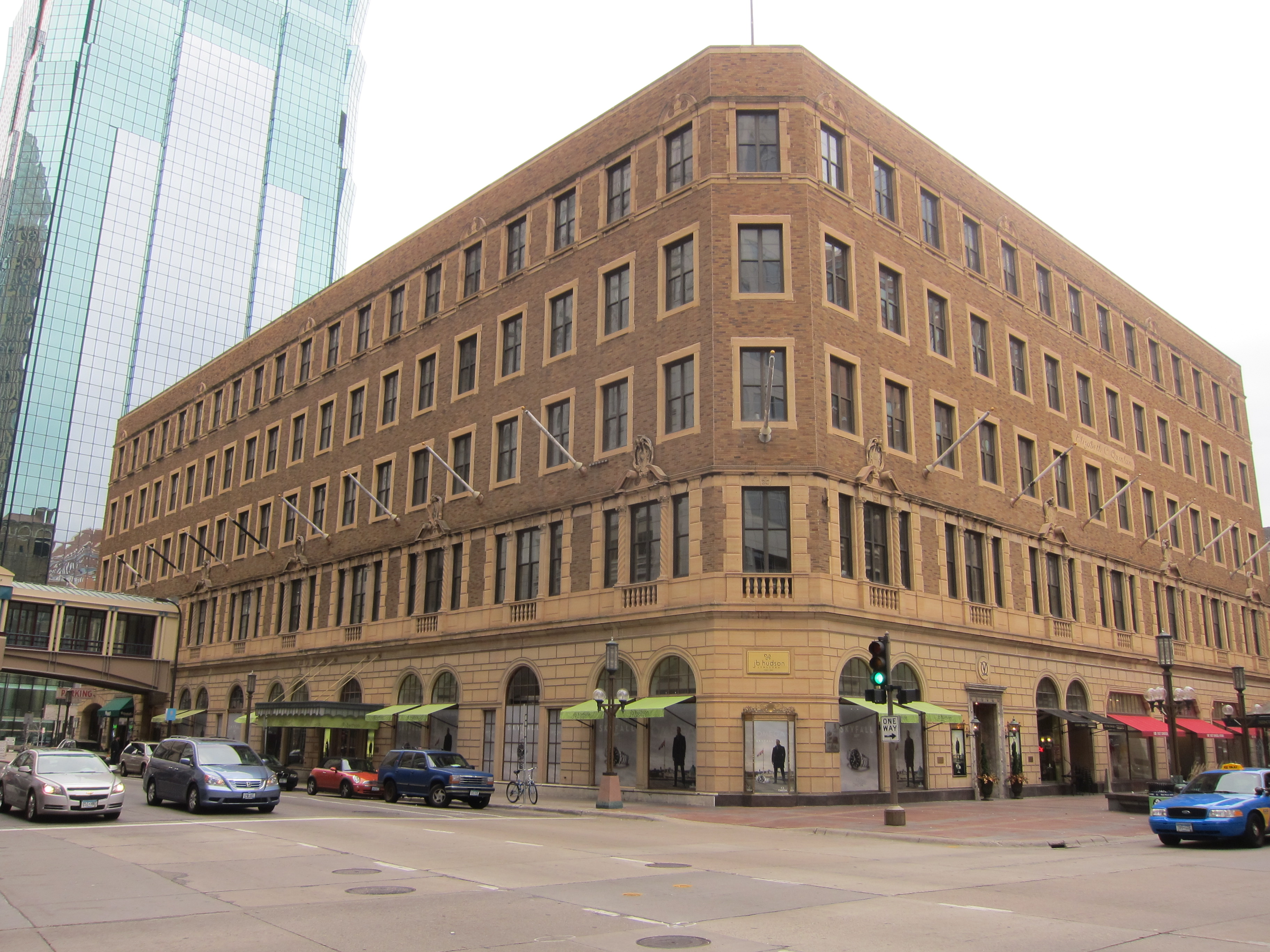
- Interactive map of the Young–Quinlan Department Store area

General information
- Status: Completed
- Architectural style: Renaissance Revival
- Location: Minneapolis, Minnesota, United States
- Coordinates: 44°58′28″N 93°16′26″W
- Opened: 1926
- Renovated: 1989

Height
- Height: 135 feet (41 m)

Technical details
- Floor count: 5

Design and construction
- Architect: Frederick L. Ackerman
- Designations: Minneapolis Historic Preservation Commission local landmark

Renovating team
- Architect: Ellerbe Becket

Other information
- Parking: Underground garage

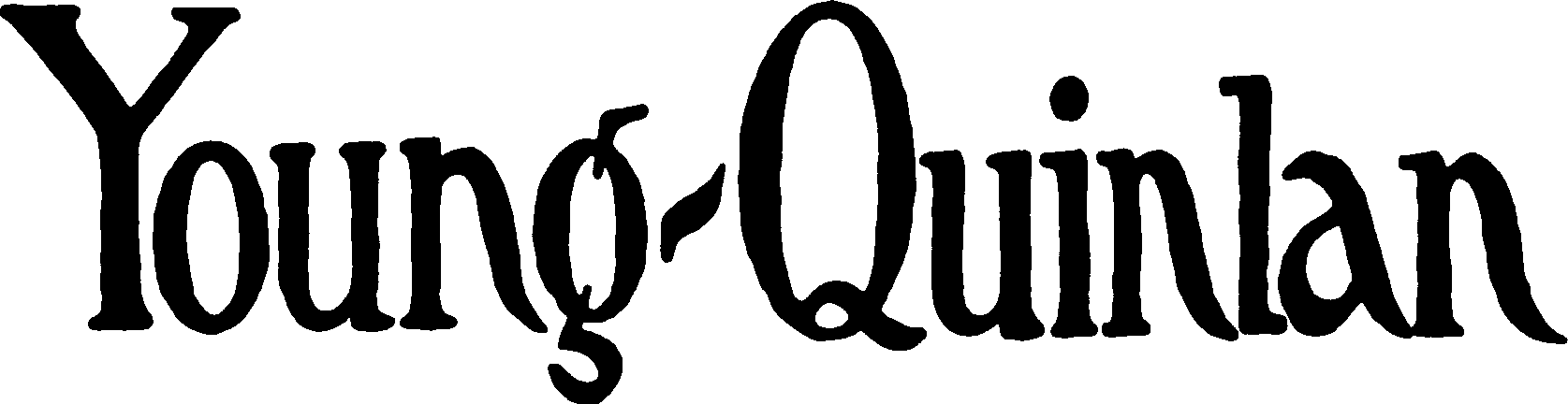
Young-Quinlan logo

The Young–Quinlan Building was erected at 901 Nicollet Avenue, Minneapolis, Minnesota in 1926. Elizabeth Quinlan and her partner, Fred D. Young, owned and operated a women's specialty dress shop when Young died in 1911. Miss Quinlan decided to expand her business and, wanting to have the best in design, consulted with department store managers and owners in New York and Chicago. She hired Frederick L. Ackerman of New York to design a "'beautiful home' for her merchandise." The local associate architects were Magney & Tusler.

Unique to the design of the building is making each of the four facades as if it were the front facade. Typically, commercial buildings were designed to have a street facade that would be the most attractive and welcoming side because it was assumed that other sides would be hidden by adjacent construction. The facades of the Young–Quinlan building look the same with arched windows, columns and decorative elements giving each side the appearance of being the entrance side of the building. A parking garage, a modern innovation for the time, was also included in the construction of the building. The building was clad with rusticated Kasota limestone on the first floor, with brick walls above and stone pilasters and columns surrounding windows. The interior has a marble staircase, crystal chandeliers, and metalwork of iron, brass, bronze, and pewter. One distinctive feature was the last elevator in the city still operated by an elevator operator.

In 1979 staff at the City Planning Department of the Office of the Mayor recommended that the exterior of the building be awarded preservation status. In 1985, renovation of the building for use by multiple tenants was begun by the owners, The 614 Company, and three years later the company sought historic designation from the Minneapolis City Council. The building was designated as a local landmark by the Minneapolis Historic Preservation Commission in 1988.
