= Minneapolis Fire Department =

Fire department in Minneapolis

Coordinates: 44°59′0″N 93°16′0″W

Operational area
- Country: United States
- State: Minnesota
- City: Minneapolis

Agency overview
- Annual calls: 41,348 (2015)
- Employees: 434 (2026)
- Annual budget: $61,444,858 (2015)
- Staffing: Career
- Fire chief: Melanie Rucker (interim)
- EMS level: Advanced Life Support (ALS) and/or Basic Life Support (BLS)
- IAFF: IAFF Local 82

Facilities and equipment
- Battalions: 5 Battalions
- Stations: 19 Stations
- Engines: 20 Engine Companies
- Trucks: 8 Ladder Companies (8 Tiller Trucks)
- Rescues: 1 Rescue Company
- HAZMAT: 2 Hazardous Materials Units
- USAR: 2 Urban Search and Rescue Teams (MN-TF1)
- Rescue boats: 7 Rescue Boats
- Light and air: 1 Light and Air Unit

Website
- Official website
- IAFF website

The Minneapolis Fire Department provides fire protection and first responder emergency medical services to the city of Minneapolis, Minnesota.

== Operations ==
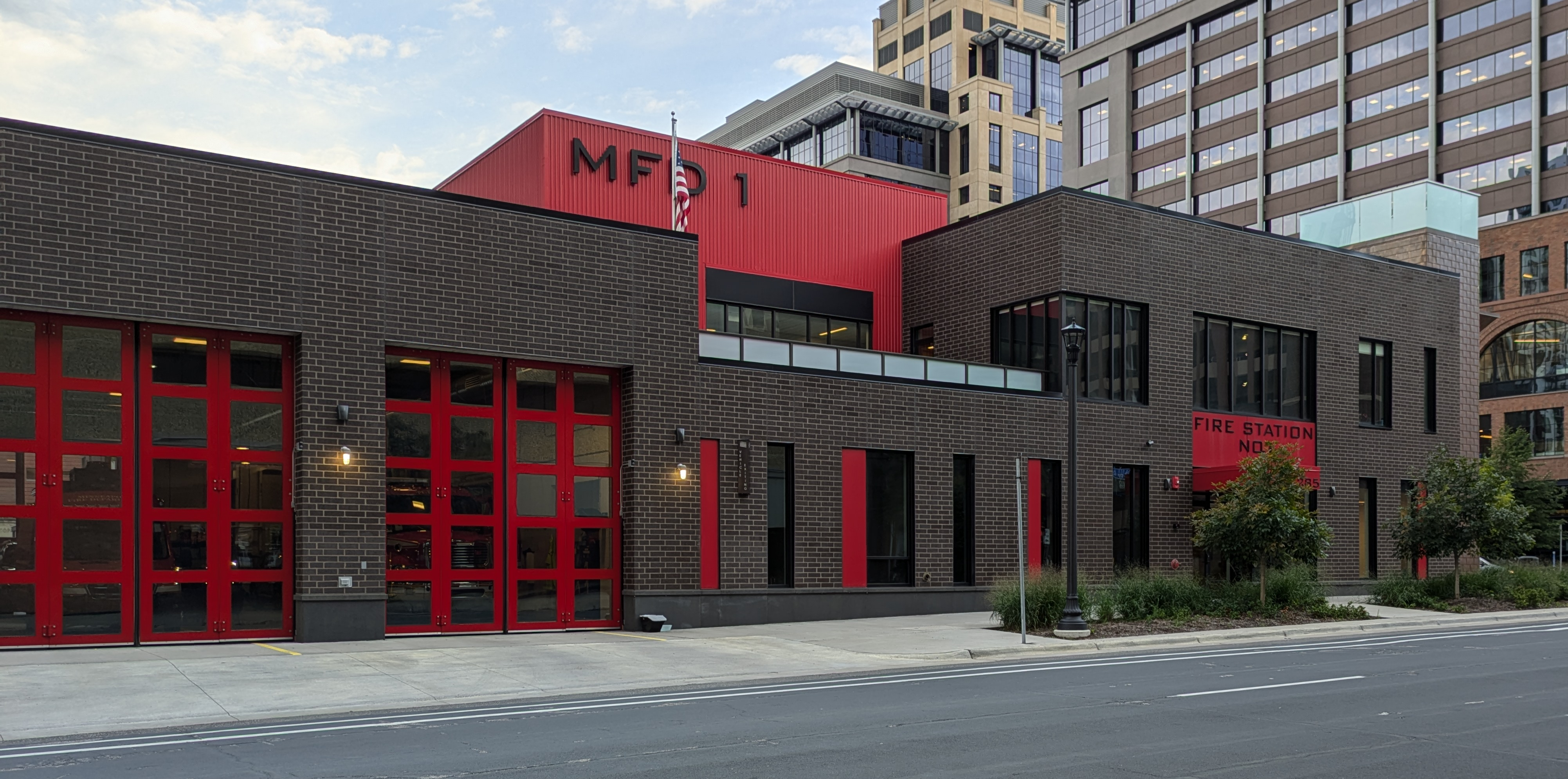
Fire Station 1

The MFD currently operates out of 19 Fire Stations, located throughout the city in 5 Battalions, under the command of 5 Battalion Chiefs and 1 Deputy Chief each shift. The MFD is also home to the Minnesota Task Force One (MNTF1) USAR Unit.

=== Minnesota Task Force 1 ===
The Minneapolis Fire Department sponsors the Minnesota Task Force 1 (MN-TF1), an urban search and rescue team based in Minneapolis–Saint Paul metro area. Along with members of the Minneapolis Fire Department, the team also has members from the Edina Fire Department, Rochester Fire Department, Dakota County Special Operations Team, and Saint Paul Fire Department.

== Stations and apparatus ==
As of May 2015 this is a complete list of all Minneapolis Fire Department fire station locations and the apparatus assigned to them.

Fire Station Number	Neighborhood	Engine Company	Ladder Company (Tiller)	Specialized Unit	Chief Unit (Deputy Chief/Battalion Chief Unit)	Battalion
1	Central	Engine 1		Mobile Command, Boat 1 (docked)	Deputy Chief	1
2	Sheridan	Engine 2		Boat 2	Battalion Chief 5	5
4	Sumner-Glenwood	Engine 4	Ladder 4 (Tiller)			4
5	Powderhorn Park	Engine 5		Salvage (Rehab/Air/Light)		3
6	Stevens Square	Engine 6, Engine 10	Ladder 11 (Tiller)	Battalion Chief 1		1
7	Seward	Engine 7	Ladder 3 (Tiller)		Battalion Chief 3	3
8	Whittier	Engine 8		Rescue 1		1
11	Marcy-Holmes	Engine 11	Ladder 9 (Tiller)	Mobile Haz Mat Lab		5
12	Morris Park	Engine 12		Boat 12		3
14	Folwell	Engine 14	Ladder 10 (Tiller)		Battalion Chief 4	4
15	Audubon Park	Engine 15	Ladder 7 (Tiller)			5
16	Harrison	Engine 16				4
17	Bryant	Engine 17			Battalion Chief 2	2
19	Prospect Park	Engine 19		Boat 19 (docked), Mass Decon Unit 1 & 2		5
20	Lind-Bohanon	Engine 20		MCI Bus		4
21	Howe	Engine 21	Ladder 2 (Tiller)	Airboat 21		3
22	West Maka Ska	Engine 22		Boat 22, Fire Investigator		2
27	Windom	Engine 27	Ladder 5 (Tiller)			2
28	Fulton	Engine 28		Boat 28		2
Minneapolis Emergency Operations Training Facility	Fridley, Minnesota	Spare Engine 28,19,5	Spare Ladder 1 (platform),3 (Tiller)	MN-TF 1 Unit 1,2		

== Notable Incidents ==
=== Minneapolis Thanksgiving Day Fire ===
On Thanksgiving night November 25, 1982, fire destroyed an entire block of Downtown Minneapolis the 16-story headquarters of Northwestern National Bank (now Wells Fargo) and the vacant, partially demolished location formerly occupied by Donaldson's department store, which had recently moved across the street to the new City Center mall. While no deaths were reported, 10 Minneapolis Firefighters were taken to the hospital with injuries suffered as a result of this fire. This was the second largest property fire in the US in 1982 and one of the largest in Minneapolis history, with 85% of the entire department (on and off duty) responding to the fire. The cause of the fire was suspected to be two juveniles playing with an acetylene torch in the vacant department store which set fire to a debris pile (charges were later dropped). The fire spread to the neighboring Norwest Bank building, which quickly spread throughout the building due to several factors including a central open atrium that allowed the fire to easily reach the upper floors and lack of fire suppression (aka sprinklers) and lack of fire containment. This fire led to significant widespread changes to building fire code.

=== I-35 West Mississippi River Bridge Collapse ===
In 2007 the Minneapolis Fire Department responded to the I-35W Mississippi River bridge collapse after the central span of the bridge suddenly gave way, followed by the adjoining spans. Northern sections of the bridge fell into a rail yard, landing on three unoccupied and stationary freight cars.

=== American Opioid Crisis ===
In 2016, the department equipped its 19 fire companies with Narcan (Nalaxone) nasal spray to counteract the effects of opioid/heroin drug overdoses. Through 2019, first responders had revived 920 individuals experiencing a probable opiate overdose, all carefully logged and documented in logs written by the members of the department. The numbers in adjacent St. Paul are high as well; since 2015 that city’s paramedics have administered 2,800 Narcan doses. Both cities’ police departments also carry the nasal spray.

=== George Floyd protests ===
The Minneapolis Fire Department responded to several fires during the period of widespread civil unrest that followed the May 25, 2020, murder of George Floyd. Across the metropolitan region, the FBI and ATF investigated 164 structure fires from arson that occurred May 27–30, 2020, during the George Floyd protests in Minneapolis–Saint Paul. Some fires spread to adjacent structures or damaged multi-use buildings. Most of properties affected by arson were commercial businesses. Arson fires also damaged a variety of buildings containing schools, non-profit organizations, government services, and private residences.

== See also ==
- John Cheatham (firefighter)
