= Folwell, Minneapolis =

Coordinates: 45.0201°N 93.2986°W

Folwell
- Neighborhood
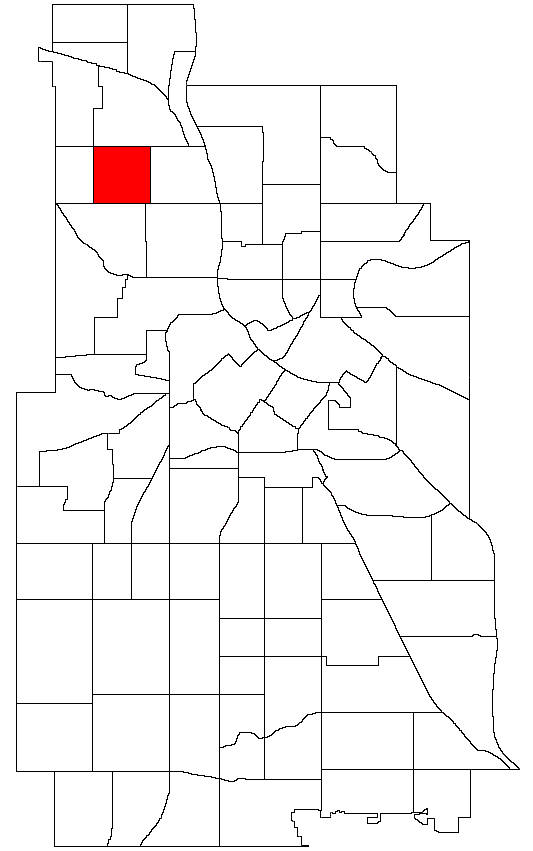
- Location of Folwell within the U.S. city of Minneapolis
- Interactive map of Folwell
- Country: United States
- State: Minnesota
- County: Hennepin
- City: Minneapolis
- Community: Camden
- City Council Ward: 4

Government
  - Council Member: LaTrisha Vetaw

Area
  - Total: 0.556 sq mi (1.44 km^{2})

Population (2020)
  - Total: 6,030
  - Density: 10,800/sq mi (4,190/km^{2})
- Time zone: UTC-6 (CST)
  - Summer (DST): UTC-5 (CDT)
- ZIP code: 55411, 55412
- Area code: 612

Historical population
Census	Pop.	Note	%±
1980	4,964		—
1990	5,115		3.0%
2000	6,331		23.8%
2010	5,344		−15.6%
2020	6,030		12.8%

Folwell is a neighborhood in the U.S. city of Minneapolis on its northside that is bound by Dowling Avenue to the north, Dupont Avenue North to the east, Lowry Avenue North to the south, and Penn Avenue North to the west. It is part of the larger Camden community. It is located in Ward 4, represented by council member LaTrisha Vetaw.

Located within the neighborhood is the 27-acre Folwell Park. The neighborhood and park are named after the American scholar and writer William Watts Folwell.

== Demographics ==
Race/ethnicity
Race/ethnicity	2000		2010		2020	
Race/ethnicity	Number	%	Number	%	Number	%
White alone	2,365	37.36	1,614	30.20	1,525	25.59
Black alone	2,492	39.36	2,388	44.69	2,638	44.27
Hispanic or Latino (any race)	224	3.54	378	7.07	773	12.97
Native American alone	109	1.72	78	1.46	90	1.51
Asian alone	772	12.19	579	10.83	495	8.31
Other race alone	20	0.32	9	0.17	26	0.44
Pacific Islander alone	1	0.02	0	0.00	0	0.00
Two or more races	348	5.50	298	5.58	412	6.91
Total	6,331	100.0	5,344	100.0	5,959	100.0
