= Emma Roberts (artist) =

American painter

(Mary) Emma Roberts
- Born: 1859
- Died: 1948 (aged 88–89)
- Resting place: Lakewood Cemetery
- Known for: Watercolor painting, visual arts education
- Movement: Arts and Crafts movement

Mary Emma Roberts (1859–1948) was an American artist and visual arts educator who worked primarily in Minneapolis, Minnesota. She produced watercolor paintings of plants and flowers, was one of the cofounders of the city's Handicraft Guild and also worked as an arts educator in the Minneapolis Public Schools.

== Early life and education ==
Roberts was born in Germantown, Philadelphia in 1859. She had two brothers, Thomas Sadler Roberts and John Walter. Her father, John Sadler Roberts, was a successful real estate businessman; when she was 7, he relocated the family to Minnesota due to poor health from tuberculosis. With Quaker ancestors both Emma and Thomas Roberts grew to love nature. Emma grew interested in the wildflowers along roadsides, in the woods, and in prairies. Her interest is later shown in the botanical watercolor paintings of those plants. As children, the Roberts siblings attended Jefferson School in Minneapolis. While attending Jefferson School, Roberts made a lifelong friendship with Jane “Jennie” Lyon Cleveland as well as Joseph and Susan Kingman. The friendship with Joseph and Susan Kingman was beneficial for Roberts later in life when she needed funding for the Handicraft Guild. Roberts was later sent to live with relatives in Maryland and Philadelphia for "finishing" to be exposed to music, the arts and upper class society. It is unknown whether she completed high school before being sent to "finishing" school.

== Career ==
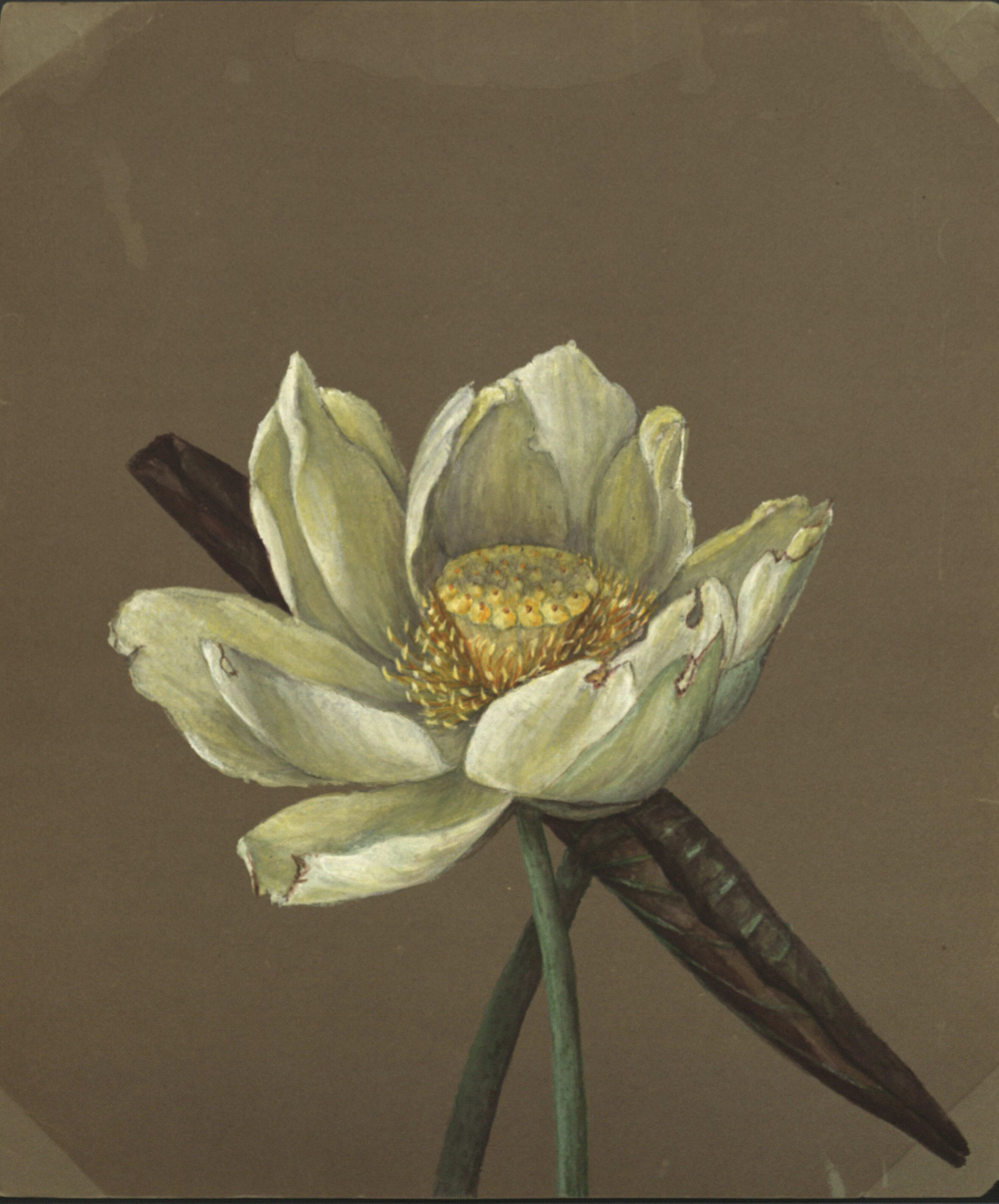
Nelumbo Great Yellow (1885)

In 1881, after returning from one of her trips to the east coast, she began to study art in Minneapolis. She became particularly interested in watercolor painting and specifically produced works showing wildflowers and plants. After her father died in 1890, she relocated with her mother and several friends to New York City. While there, she continued to study watercolor painting under Rhoda Holmes Nicholls and also became active with the Art Students League of New York. Roberts' works were shown at different museums in New York, Philadelphia and Cleveland. In 1893, her work was selected to be displayed in Minnesota's building at the World's Columbian Exposition in Chicago. After her successful exhibition there, she formed her own studio with her friend Florence Wales and continued to study under Irving Ramsey Wiles and Childe Hassam. In 1897, she produced a watercolor of chrysanthemums titled In November. Originally exhibited at a show sponsored by the Minneapolis Art League, it later toured the country and was displayed at the American Watercolor Society, Art Institute of Chicago and the Greater America Exposition in Omaha, Nebraska.

In the late 1890s, Roberts began working in visual arts education and became the assistant director of drawing for the Minneapolis Public Schools. In 1904, she took over as the director of drawing. She developed a program in collaboration with the Minneapolis Institute of Art where students visited the museum on study tours. She wrote a number of instructional works including Drawing and Handwork: Outlines and Suggestions (1913), Pencil and Brush: Art in the Minneapolis Schools (1916) and a series of short pamphlets called Picture Studies. She also developed an entirely new curriculum around art appreciation.

In 1904, she cofounded the city's Handicraft Guild along with Florence Willets and local printmaker Mary Moulton Cheney. The guild was affiliated with the Arts and Crafts movement and provided space, instruction and advocacy for women artists in the city. Roberts served as the guild's president from 1906 to 1917. The organization grew rapidly, outgrowing its original home in just two years. She commissioned Edwin Hawley Hewitt to build them a new home, the Handicraft Guild Building, which opened in 1906. Hewitt also built an arts and crafts style home for Roberts in 1913 in the city's Tangletown neighborhood.

== Gallery of selected works ==
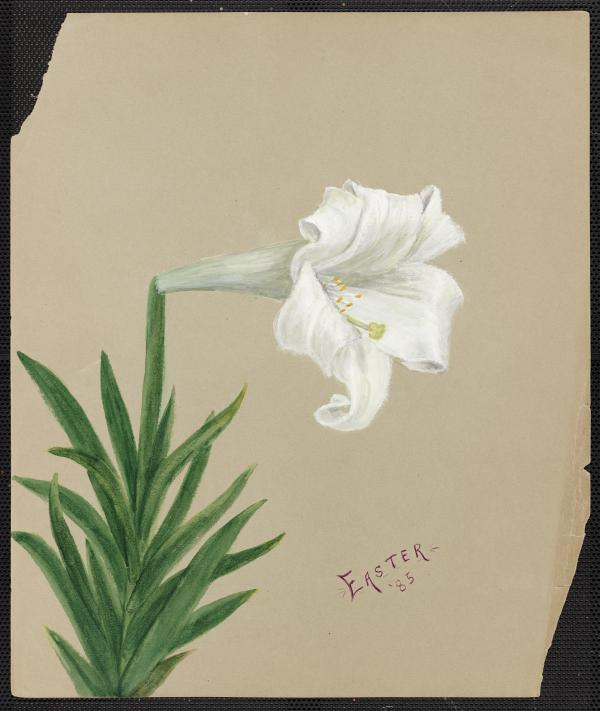
Easter Lily, Easter 1885

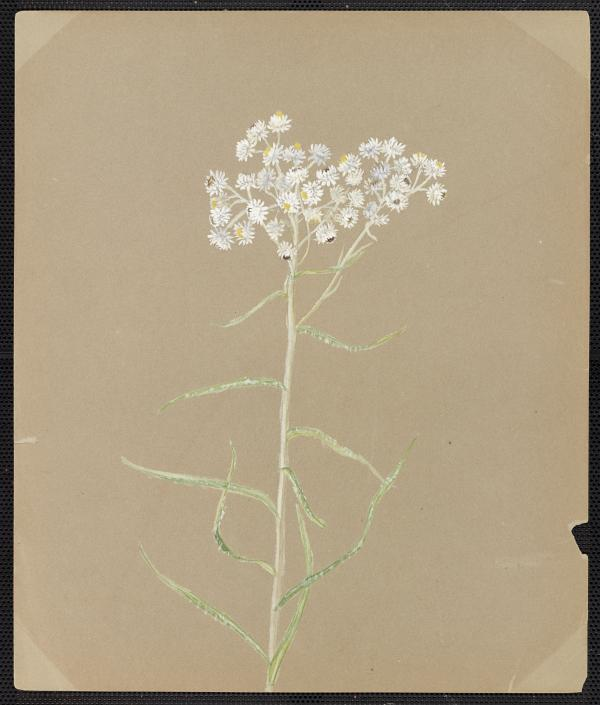
Anaphalis margaritacea, Benth. & Hook. (Pearly Everlasting), August 16, 1885

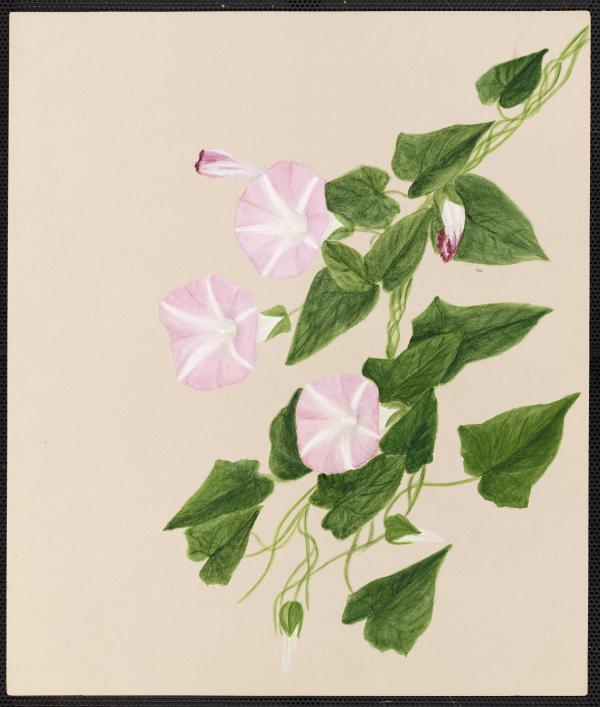
Calystegia sepium, R. Br. (Hedge Bindweed), July 13, 1883

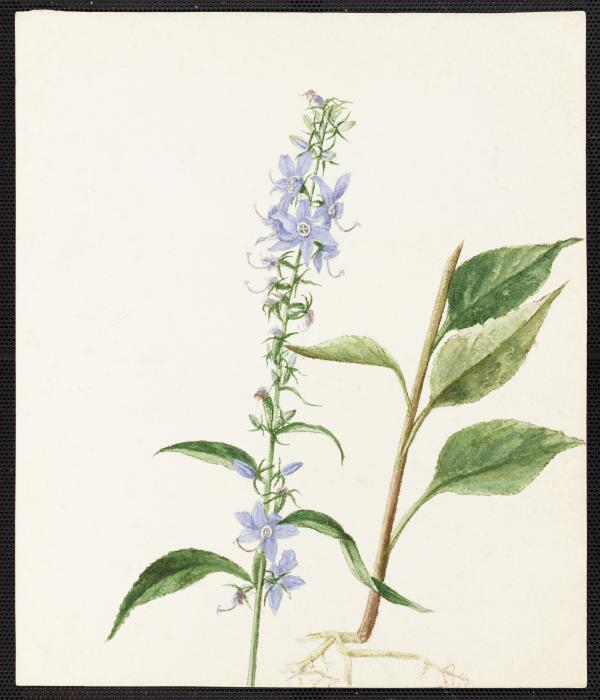
Campanula Americana, L. (Tall Bellflower), August 11, 1885

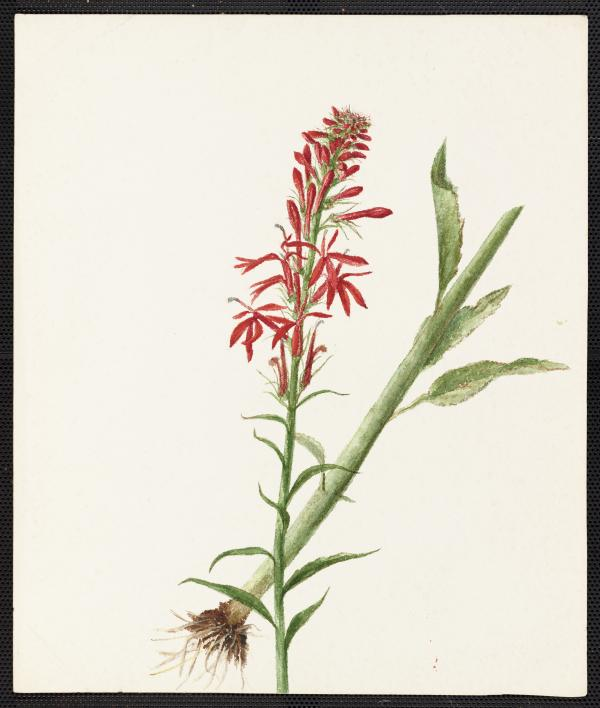
Lobelia cardinalis, L. (Cardinal Flower), August 11, 1885

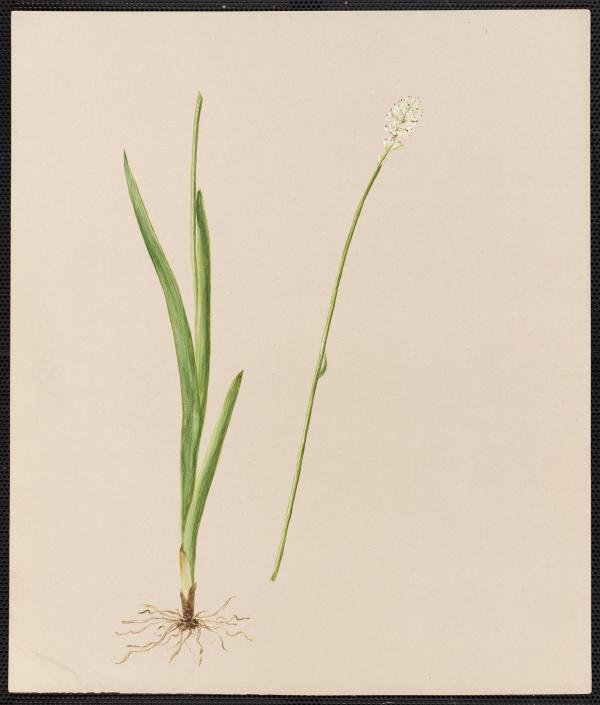
Tofieldia glutinosa, Willd. (False Asphodel), June 1884

== Later life and death ==
In 1919, the Handicraft Guild was absorbed into the University of Minnesota's art education department in a mutual agreement. Roberts stepped down from her position with the Minneapolis Public Schools a year later, but continued to occasionally teach as an instructor at the university. Later in life she spent her time traveling and with her family and friends. She died in 1948 in Los Angeles and is buried in Lakewood Cemetery in Minneapolis.
