= Mary Moulton Cheney =

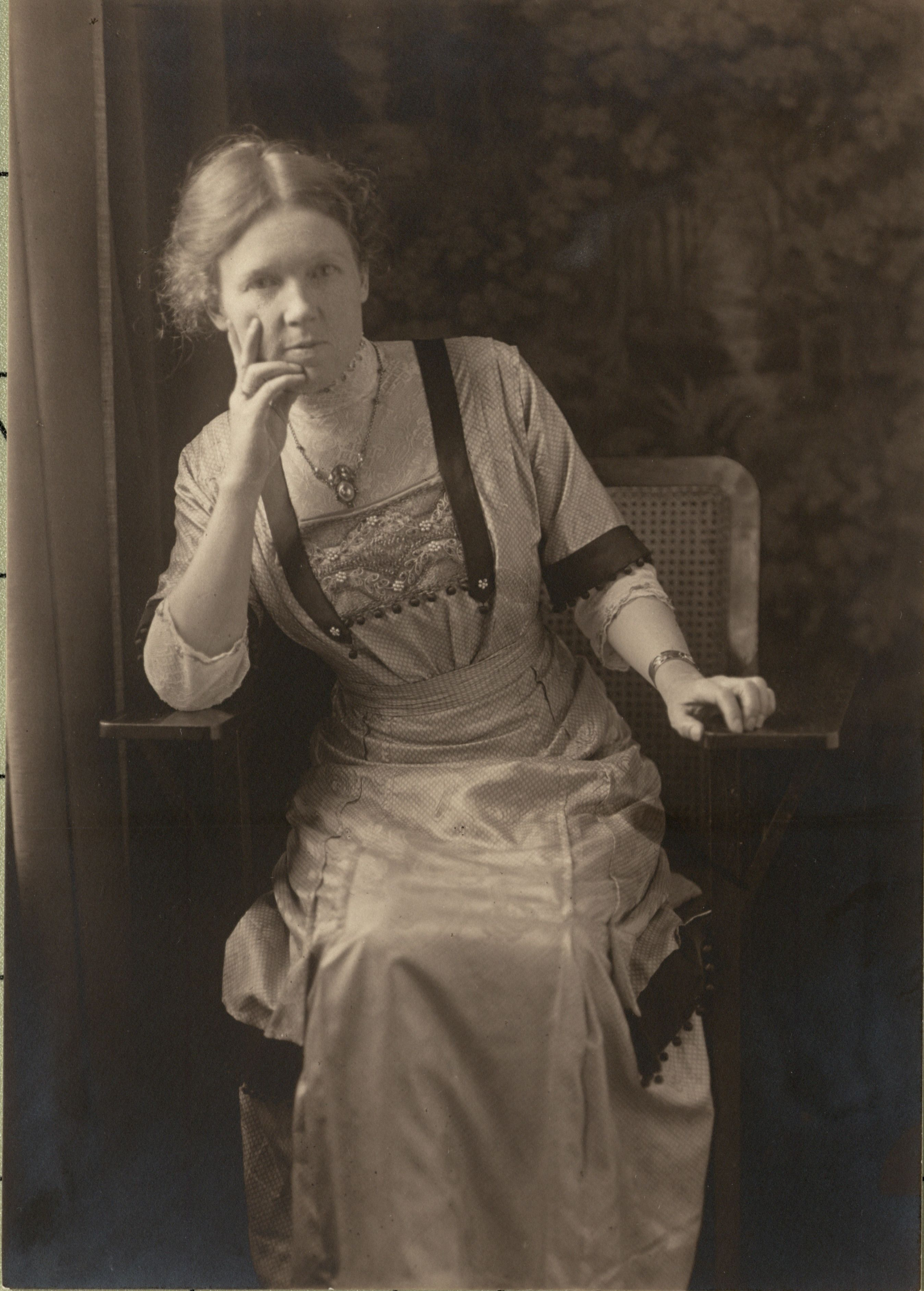
- Mary Moulton Cheney, 1910s
- Born: 1871
- Died: 1957 (aged 85–86)
- Education: University of Minnesota, School of the Museum of Fine Arts, Boston, Harvard Summer School
- Known for: Printmaking, bookbinding, visual arts education
- Movement: Arts and Crafts movement

Mary Moulton Cheney (1871 – 1957) was an artist and visual arts educator in Minneapolis. In addition to her own work with printmaking, bookbinding and design, she was also involved with the Minneapolis College of Art and Design, the Handicraft Guild and other arts organizations in the city.

== Early life and education ==
Cheney was born in St. Anthony, Minnesota in 1871. She attended the University of Minnesota and, after graduating in 1892, went on to study at the School of the Museum of Fine Arts, Boston and at Harvard Summer School. While in Boston, she studied design as well as painting and worked with Denman Ross and George Elmer Browne among others.

== Career and work ==
Cheney returned to Minneapolis in 1897 and started her own studio. She opened a printmaking shop with Mary Marsh Smith named The Artcraft Shop: Sign of the Bay Tree. They produced a variety of different items including clothing tags, calendars and greeting cards. Her cards have been identified as part of the Arts and Crafts movement and, along with contemporaries like Amy Maria Sacker, marked a shift away from imagery-driven designs and toward designs which used printed text. In 1902, she expanded into bookbinding and founded a new company named The Chemith Press which produced custom printed books, pamphlets and bookplates. Cheney also continued to work on designing furniture, fixtures and household items. In 1902, one of her designs for a candlestick was purchased by Tiffany Studios.

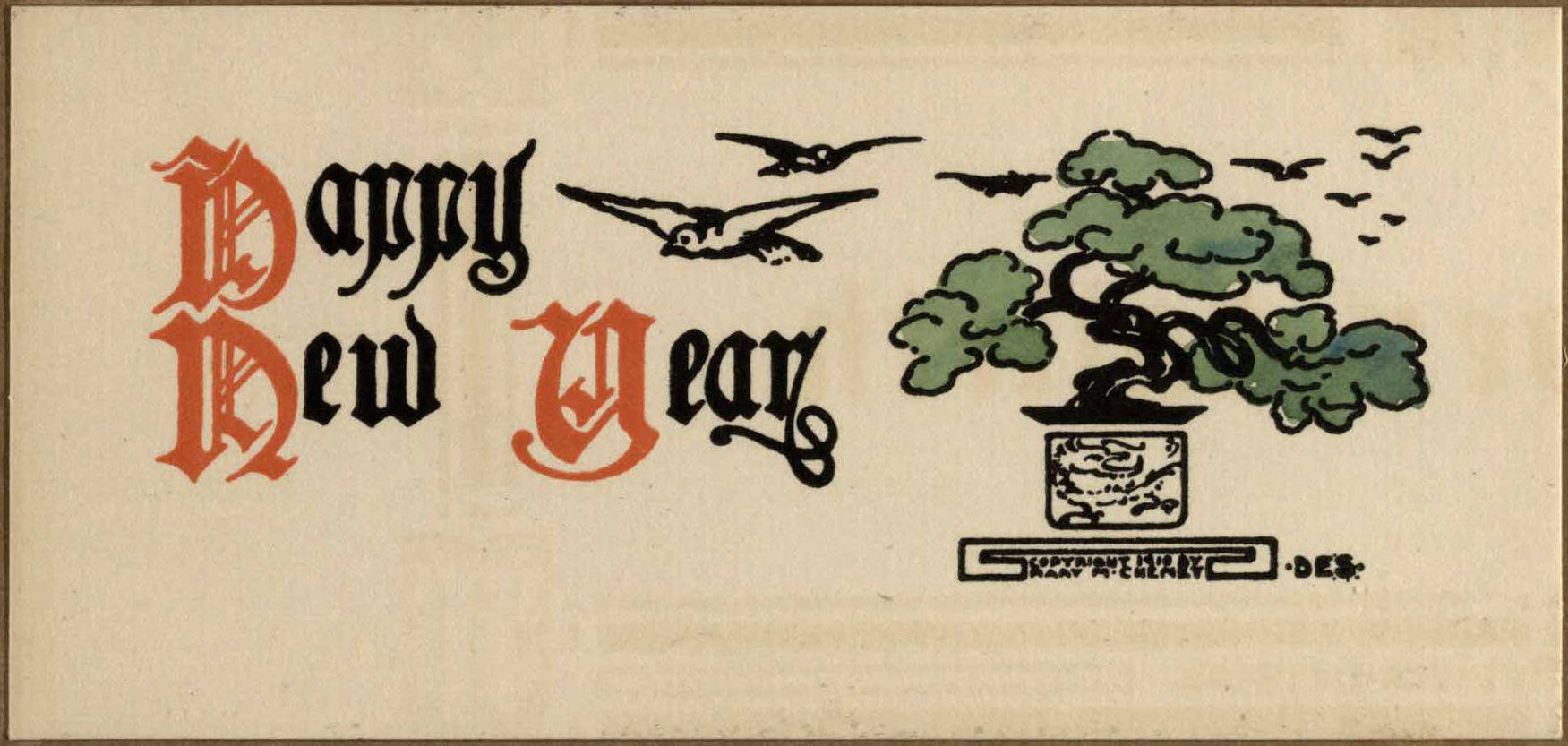
A 1910 greeting card for the New Year created by Cheney

Cheney was also an influential figure in the development of the Minneapolis College of Art and Design. After returning to Minneapolis in 1897, she organized the first class on design at the school's forerunner, the Minneapolis School of Fine Arts. She went on to become the principal of the school's design department, then the Dean of Women, and finally served as the college's president from 1917 to 1925. She later taught at the Minneapolis Vocational High School from 1928 until 1942.

Beyond her own work and involvement with the Minneapolis College of Art and Design, Cheney was also extremely active with the artistic community in Minneapolis. One biography notes she "seems to have served as founder, leader, or both, for almost every early arts organization in Minneapolis, as well as the Minnesota State Art Society." She was a co-founder of the city's Handicraft Guild along with Emma Roberts and Florence Willets, worked with a variety of women's and arts clubs, served on the Minnesota state art board and also ran her own artistic retreat in Walker, Minnesota for women. She also maintained close ties to the Boston-area arts community and worked to organize exhibitions and tours of works in Minneapolis.

Some of Cheney's works are held today by the Minnesota Historical Society, the Ramsey County Historical Society and the Hennepin County Library.
