= Hinkle–Murphy House =

Historic house in Minnesota, United States

- U.S. National Register of Historic Places
- Minneapolis Landmark
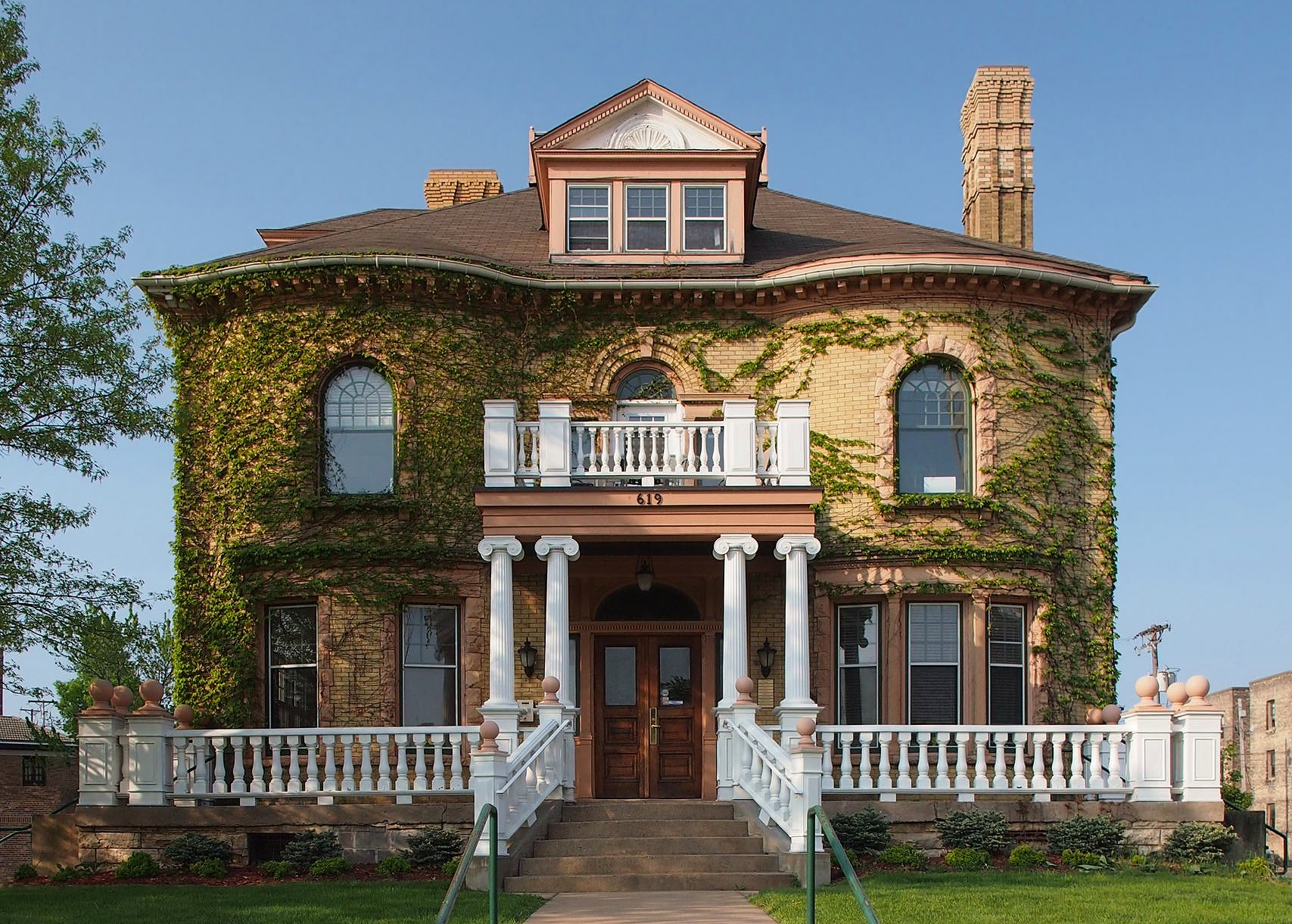
- The Hinkle–Murphy House from the northeast

- Location within Minnesota Location within the United States
- Location: 619 10th Street South, Minneapolis, Minnesota
- Coordinates: 44°58′11.5″N 93°15′56.7″W
- Area: less than one acre
- Built: 1886–7
- Architect: William Channing Whitney
- Architectural style: Colonial Revival
- NRHP reference No.: 84001438

Significant dates
- Added to NRHP: September 20, 1984
- Designated MPLSL: 1998

The Hinkle–Murphy House is a historic building in Minneapolis, Minnesota, United States. It was designed in 1886 as a private residence in the Colonial Revival style by William Channing Whitney (later to be the architect of the Minnesota Governor's Residence), and is considered to be the first Georgian Revival style house in Minnesota. The house was occupied successively by Minneapolis businessmen William H. Hinkle and William J. Murphy.

The Hinkle–Murphy House is located at 619 South 10th Street in the Elliot Park neighborhood near downtown Minneapolis. It was added to the National Register of Historic Places in 1984 for its architectural significance. As of 2007, the interior of the house is used as leasable office space.

== See also ==
- National Register of Historic Places listings in Hennepin County, Minnesota
