= Arts in Minneapolis =

Cultural resources in Minneapolis

Minneapolis is the largest city in the US state of Minnesota, and the county seat of Hennepin County.

Minneapolitans support a dozen large art, cultural, science, and historical museums alongside smaller galleries and museums, four large ballet, dance, and folkdance companies, as well as filmmakers groups and numerous theater companies. The city publishes updates to The Minneapolis Plan for Arts and Culture which has produced results such as the formal recognition of the Northeast Arts District in Northeast Minneapolis.

== Visual art ==
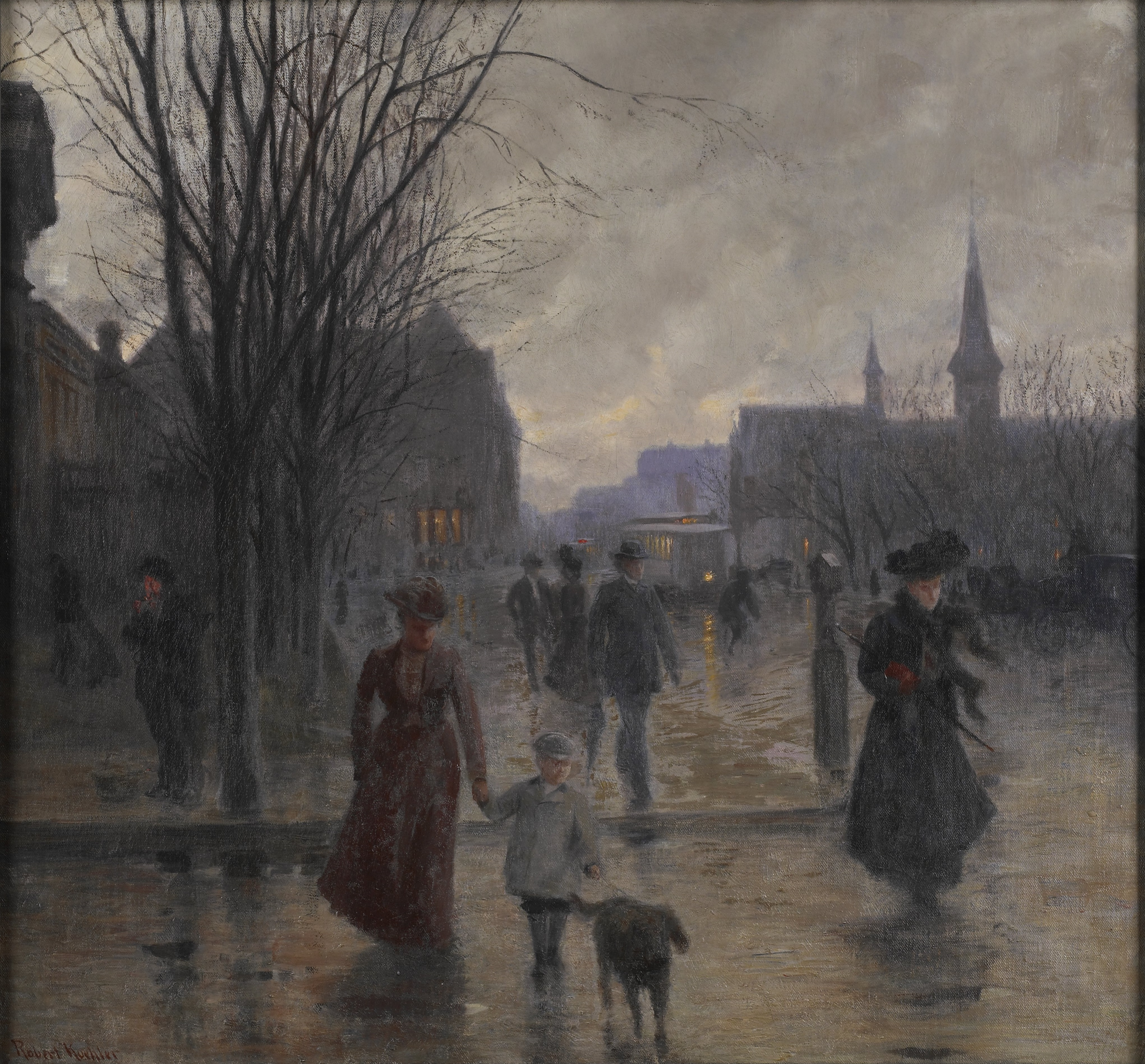
Robert Koehler painting Rainy Evening on Hennepin Avenue c. 1902. The oil on canvas original is at the Minneapolis Institute of Arts

The Minneapolis Institute of Arts, founded in 1883, is located near the Minneapolis College of Art and Design in south central Minneapolis. Designed by the New York architectural firm McKim, Mead and White, the original building opened its doors in 1915. Already the largest art museum in the city, the MIA expanded in 1974 with an addition designed by the late Japanese architect Kenzo Tange. In June 2006, the museum unveiled a new wing designed by architect Michael Graves. The Minneapolis Park Board collaborated with the Walker Art Center to build the outdoor Minneapolis Sculpture Garden near downtown and across the street from the center. The north wing of the Walker Art Center opened in 1971 and was designed by Edward Larrabee Barnes. In 2005, an expansion designed by Herzog & de Meuron opened that doubled the size of the museum and added new galleries, a restaurant, and a 385-seat theater. The Weisman Art Museum on the University of Minnesota campus offers a varied collection with strengths in early American modernism, ceramics, and Asian furniture. The Weisman is housed in a stainless steel building designed by architect Frank Gehry.

The Warehouse District adjoining downtown was a hub of studio and gallery activity in the 1980s and early 1990s, but increasing rents and a surge of condominium and retail development caused many artists and galleries to relocate to other areas of the city or to the Lowertown District of downtown Saint Paul. Despite the negative effects of gentrification on the neighborhood's art scene, the Warehouse District continues to be home to various studio buildings, commercial art galleries, and nonprofit arts organizations. The Traffic Zone Center for Visual Art (TZCVA), a prominent artist cooperative and exhibition space founded in 1995, anchors the eastern part of the district. The artist collective in Minneapolis, The Handicraft Guild founded in 1904, sits just outside the North Loop in the business district of downtown next to the headquarters of the Target corporation. South Minneapolis had the Soap Factory, an experimental art space the operated for 30 years before shutting down in 2019 due to financial issues.

Today, Northeast Minneapolis is a vibrant visual arts community in the city, including the Northeast Minneapolis Arts District established in 2001, and the Northeast Minneapolis Arts Association. Art-a-Whirl in May and The Art Attack at the Northrup-King building in November are open-studio events in Northeast Minneapolis. The Stone Arch Festival is held on the riverfront across from downtown. The Uptown Art Fair and art fairs in Loring Park and Powderhorn Park are held during August. Minnesota Center for Book Arts is known for supporting the traditional crafts of hand papermaking, letterpress printing and hand bookbinding, and contemporary art and artists utilizing these disciplines. Founded during the 1970s, the Women's Art Registry of Minnesota (WARM) collective and gallery was in Minneapolis until it moved to Saint Paul where it continues as a volunteer organization.

Juxtaposition Arts, located in Jordan, is a youth-oriented visual art center.

Beyond the Minneapolis Sculpture Garden, there are a number of outdoor artworks throughout Minneapolis including Jeff Barber's Cottontail on the Trail and the statue of Mary Tyler Moore on Nicollet Mall.

== Music ==
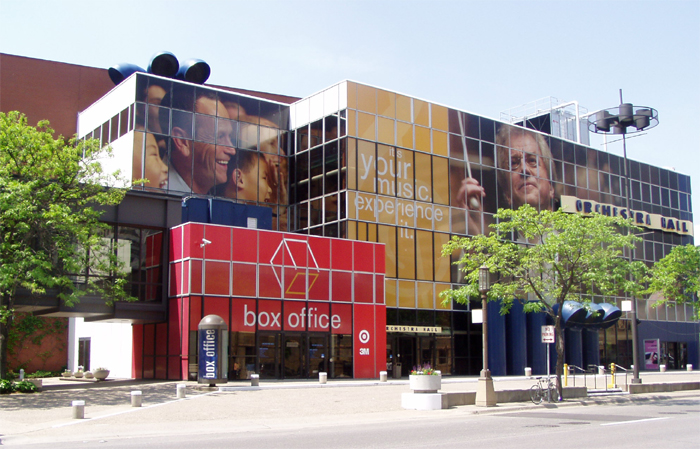
Orchestra Hall

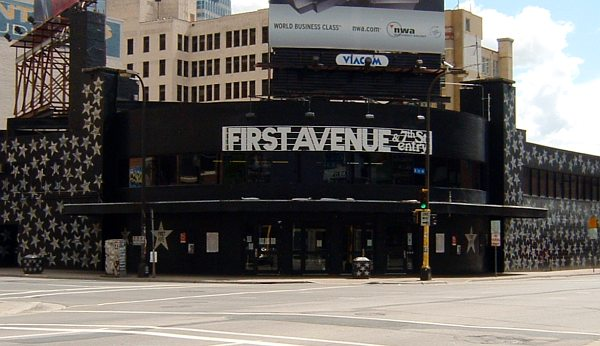
First Avenue

Minneapolis presents live music performances of all kinds. Koerner, Ray & Glover played West Bank cafes while the Metropolitan Opera stopped at Northrop Auditorium. The State Theatre, Orpheum Theatre, Dakota, Walker Art Center and Guthrie Theater bring new music to Minneapolis. Bob Dylan, a Minnesota native, briefly spent time playing the Dinkytown folk music circuit. Classical music is performed at Orchestra Hall as well as small venues like the Bakken Library and Museum. The Minnesota Opera moved back to Minneapolis from Saint Paul in 1990, one of seven opera companies now operating in the area, including the Mill City Summer Opera. Concerts at stadiums and theaters in the area continue to draw the world's finest musicians. The MacPhail Center for Music founded in 1907 built new facilities near the Mississippi riverfront in 2006. Prince is Minneapolis's most famous musical progeny. With fellow local musicians, many of whom recorded at Twin/Tone Records, he helped make First Avenue & 7th Street Entry and Minneapolis one of the most important music venues in the United States. The Time, The Replacements, The Jayhawks, Lifter Puller, Hüsker Dü, Soul Asylum, Boiled in Lead, Tapes 'n Tapes, Motion City Soundtrack, Dosh and Happy Apple are well known Minneapolis acts. The city has garnered notice for rap and hip hop and the underground group Atmosphere, as well as various other hip-hop artists on the independent label Rhymesayers Entertainment such as P.O.S, Eyedea, DJ Abilities and Brother Ali. A home to poetry readings in live music venues, Minneapolis has also developed a vibrant spoken word community. The Minnesota Boychoir now serving Minnesota for 52 years is a big part of the culture in Minnesotan Choral culture.

== Theater ==
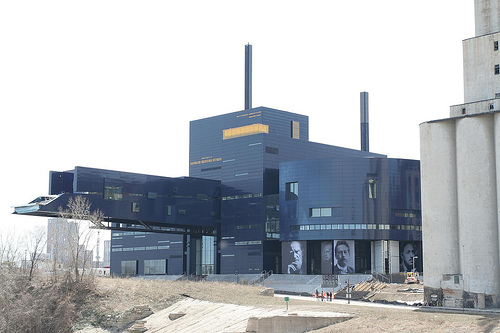
Guthrie Theater

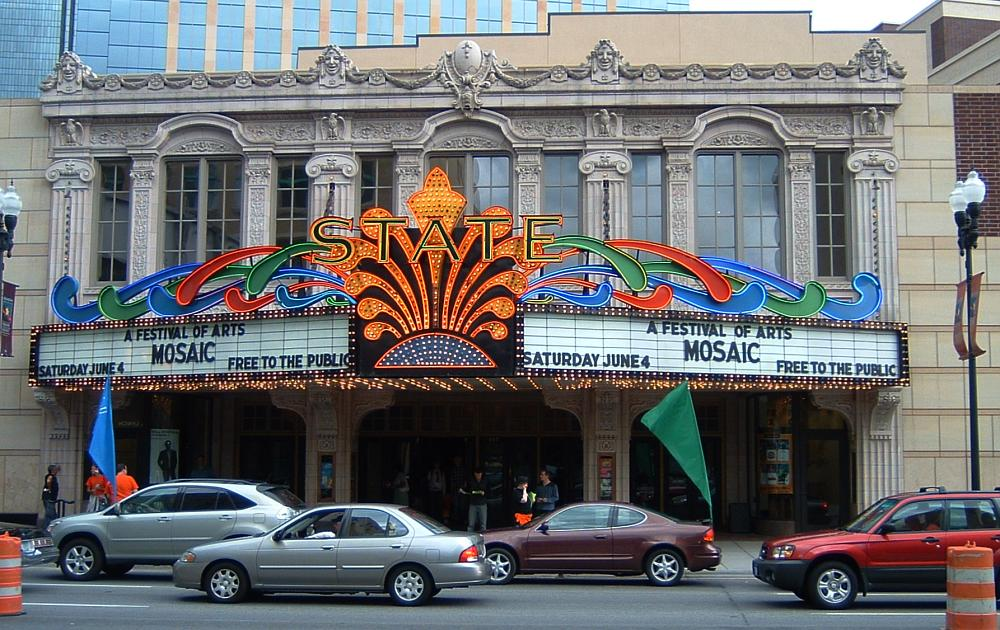
State Theatre

The Twin Cities has an active live theater scene and is the third-largest theater market in the U.S. after New York City and Chicago, supporting the Jungle, Mixed Blood, Skewed Visions, the Brave New Workshop, Theater Latté Da and the Children's Theatre Company.

The Guthrie Theater has 32,000 subscribers and moved in 2006 to a riverfront complex designed by Jean Nouvel for three stages—thrust (1,100 seats), proscenium (700 seats) and experimental (200 seats). The 178-foot cantilevered bridge to the Mississippi is open to visitors during box office hours. Founder Tyrone Guthrie who directed a modern-dress production of Hamlet for the opening in 1963, was devoted to innovation. For the opening of the new Guthrie, artistic director Joe Dowling chose The Real Thing.

Minneapolis purchased and renovated three historic theaters on Hennepin Avenue which are leased and managed through 2035 by a non-profit trust and guaranteed by Clear Channel Communications subsidiary SFX Entertainment and spin-off Live Nation. The Orpheum (2,618 seats), the State (2,181 seats) and the Pantages (900 seats) were built between 1916 and 1921 for vaudeville, movies and music and now offer concerts and Broadway and off-Broadway shows.

== Literature ==
The Loft Literary Center founded in 1974 and The Playwrights' Center support many of the writers, poets, and playwrights who flourish in the area.

== Dance ==
A number of dance and performance arts organizations are based in Minneapolis. These include organizations that range from the James Sewell Ballet to Cheer, Dorothy, Cheer!, a six-person troop that performs choreographed cheerleader inspired routines.

The historic Shubert Theatre building was physically moved three blocks to a new location on Hennepin Avenue adjacent to the Hennepin Center for the Arts. The Shubert (now Goodale Theater) and HCA combined to form the Cowles Center for Dance and the Performing Arts.

== See also ==
- Music of Minnesota
- Theater in Minnesota
