= Paist =

Paist is a surname. Notable people with the surname include:

- Henrietta Barclay Paist (1870–1930), American artist, designer, teacher, and author
- Phineas Paist (1873–1937), American architect
