= Emma Roberts (disambiguation) =

Emma Roberts is an American actress.

Emma Roberts may also refer to:

- Emma Roberts (author) (1794–1840), English author
- Emma Roberts (artist) (1859–1948), American artist
- Lady Gerald Fitzalan-Howard, English aristocrat, born Emma Georgina Egerton Roberts
