= H. Alden Smith House =

Historic house in Minnesota, United States

- U.S. National Register of Historic Places
- Minneapolis Landmark
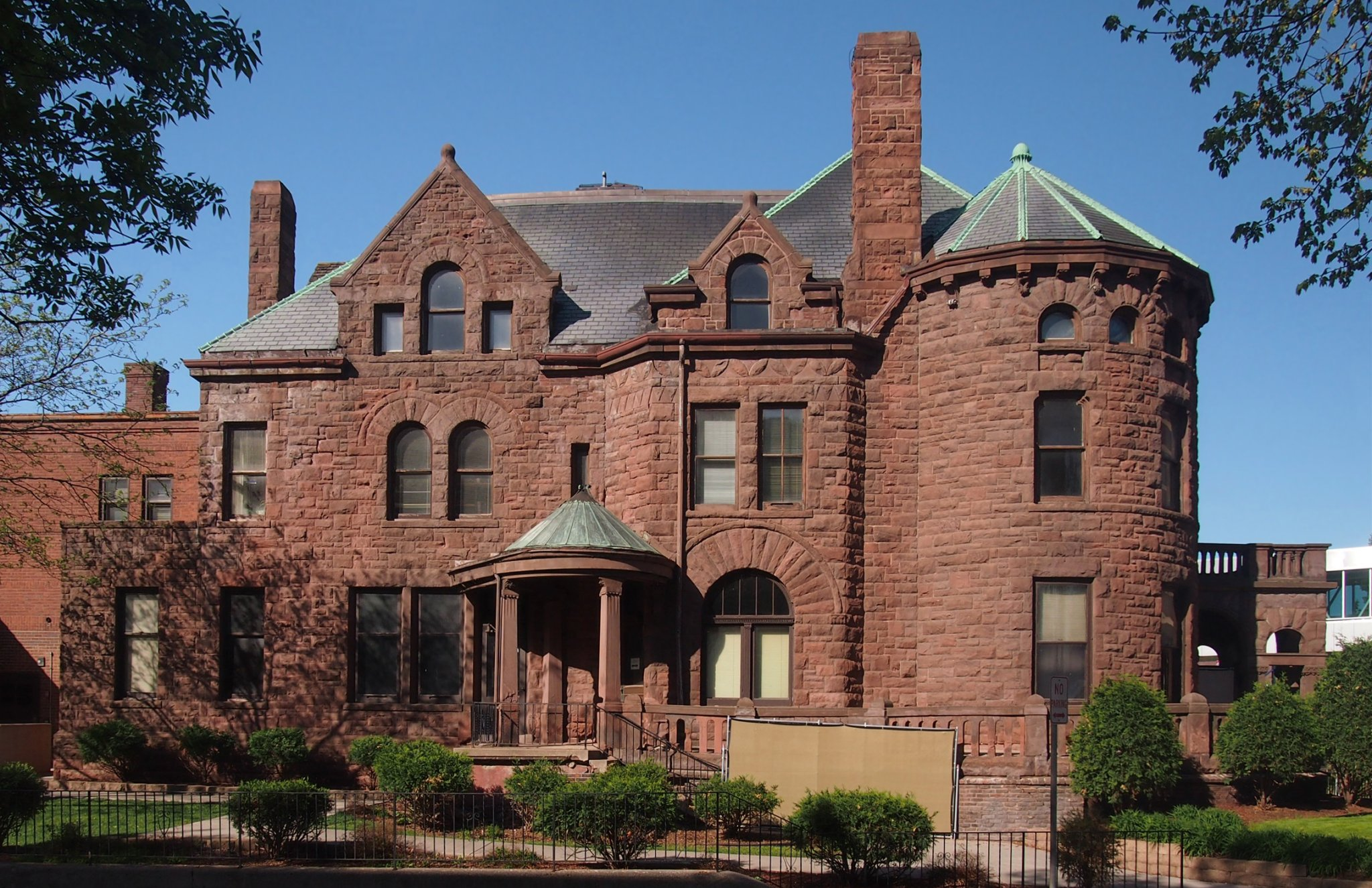
- H. Alden Smith House as viewed from Spruce Place

- Location within Minnesota Location within the United States
- Location: 1400 Harmon Place, Minneapolis, Minnesota
- Coordinates: 44°58′20.5″N 93°16′56.3″W
- Built: 1887
- Architect: William Channing Whitney
- Architectural style: Richardsonian Romanesque
- NRHP reference No.: 76001063

Significant dates
- Added to NRHP: March 16, 1976
- Designated MPLSL: 1980

The H. Alden Smith House is a former mansion located within the Harmon Place Historic District near downtown Minneapolis, Minnesota. Designed in the Richardsonian Romanesque style by architect William Channing Whitney, it was completed in 1887 and listed in the National Register of Historic Places in 1976. The house is the sole remnant of the Harmon Place mansion district, an elite residential neighborhood that existed between the 1880s and 1920s.

== History ==
Horatio Alden Smith, the home's original owner, was a partner in the Smith & Wyman Sash and Door Company. Following a successful period in that business, Smith purchased property in the wealthy Harmon Place neighborhood and commissioned the prolific local architect William Channing Whitney to design a new home for him and his family. Smith lived in the home with his wife Eva and daughter Alice from 1887 to 1906, when he died of a heart attack.

Eva continued to live in the home until 1919, when she sold it to local mortician William Davies. Davies soon converted the home into a mortuary and used it as such until 1976. The house was then converted into a restaurant called The Little Prince in 1977, but this venture was short-lived. Following the restaurant's closing in 1978, the house was used as a counseling clinic and an office building. In 1990 the house served as the filming location for a scene in the movie Drop Dead Fred.

The Minneapolis Community College Foundation purchased the house in 1993 for $350,000. After renovating the structure for educational purposes, it was renamed the Wells Family College Center. Minneapolis Community and Technical College used the house for miscellaneous purposes until 2018, when it was sold to local developer W+Noordijk. The house was later rehabilitated and converted into apartment units as part of a larger residential development project, which was completed in 2022.

== Architecture ==
William Channing Whitney designed the H. Alden Smith house in the Richardsonian Romanesque style of architecture. Featuring a brown sandstone facade, the three-story home boasts a massive corner tower, front and side porches, and a stained-glass skylight. Although much of the interior has been modified over time, the first level retains the original reception hall and grand staircase. The original parlor, dining room, library, and sitting room also remain intact. Decadent panelling and cherry woodwork can be found throughout this level.

Though heavily modified, the second and third floors retain some original features such as doors and fireplaces. The second floor originally housed bedrooms and bathrooms, while the third floor featured a ballroom and servants' quarters.

== See also ==
- National Register of Historic Places listings in Hennepin County, Minnesota
