= Charles J. Martin House =

Historic house in Minnesota, United States

- U.S. National Register of Historic Places
- Minneapolis Landmark
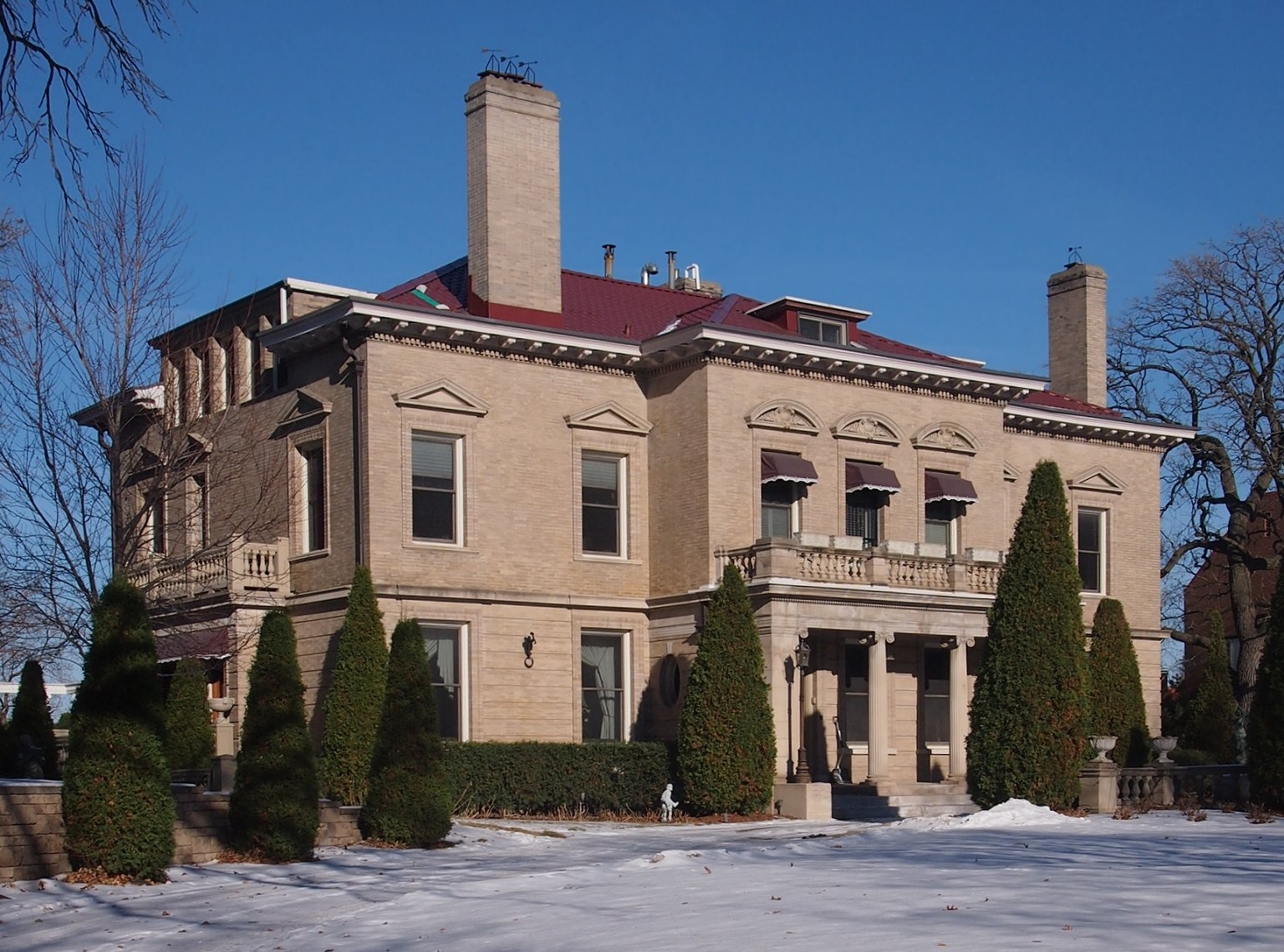
- The Charles J. Martin House from the southwest

- Location within Minnesota Location within the United States
- Interactive map showing the location of Charles J. Martin House
- Location: 1300 Mount Curve Avenue, Minneapolis, Minnesota
- Coordinates: 44°58′4″N 93°17′45.6″W
- Area: 2 acres (0.81 ha)
- Built: 1903
- Architect: William Channing Whitney
- Architectural style: Renaissance Revival
- NRHP reference No.: 78001541

Significant dates
- Added to NRHP: April 26, 1978
- Designated MPLSL: 1986

The Charles J. Martin House is a house in the Lowry Hill neighborhood of Minneapolis, Minnesota, United States. The 1903 Renaissance Revival mansion and its grounds are a well-preserved example of an early-20th-century urban estate. The property was listed on the National Register of Historic Places in 1978 for having local significance in architecture.

The house was built for Charles J. Martin. He served for many years as the secretary and treasurer of the Washburn-Crosby Company, a predecessor of General Mills. Martin also promoted civic causes such as city parks, libraries, and art societies.

The house was designed by prominent Minneapolis architect William Channing Whitney in the Renaissance Revival style, which was popular for large urban residences at the beginning of the 20th century. The house has been well preserved and well maintained.

== See also ==
- National Register of Historic Places listings in Hennepin County, Minnesota
