= Handicraft Guild Building =

Coordinates: 44°58′24″N 93°16′25″W

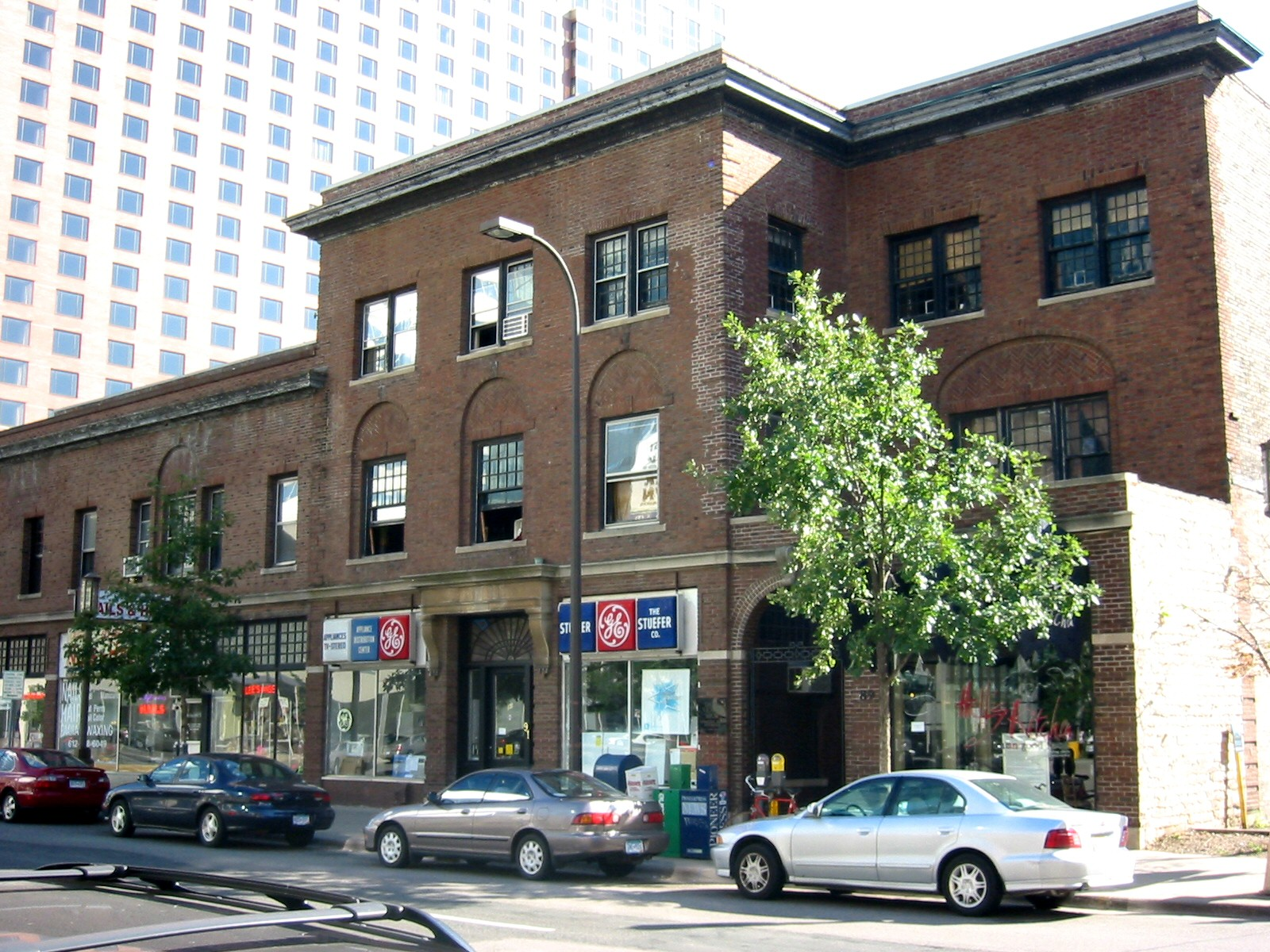
- The Handicraft Guild Building
- Interactive map of Handicraft Guild Building
- Location: 89 10th Street South, Minneapolis, Minnesota, United States
- Built: 1907
- Architect: William Channing Whitney
- Architectural style: Georgian Revival/Arts & Crafts

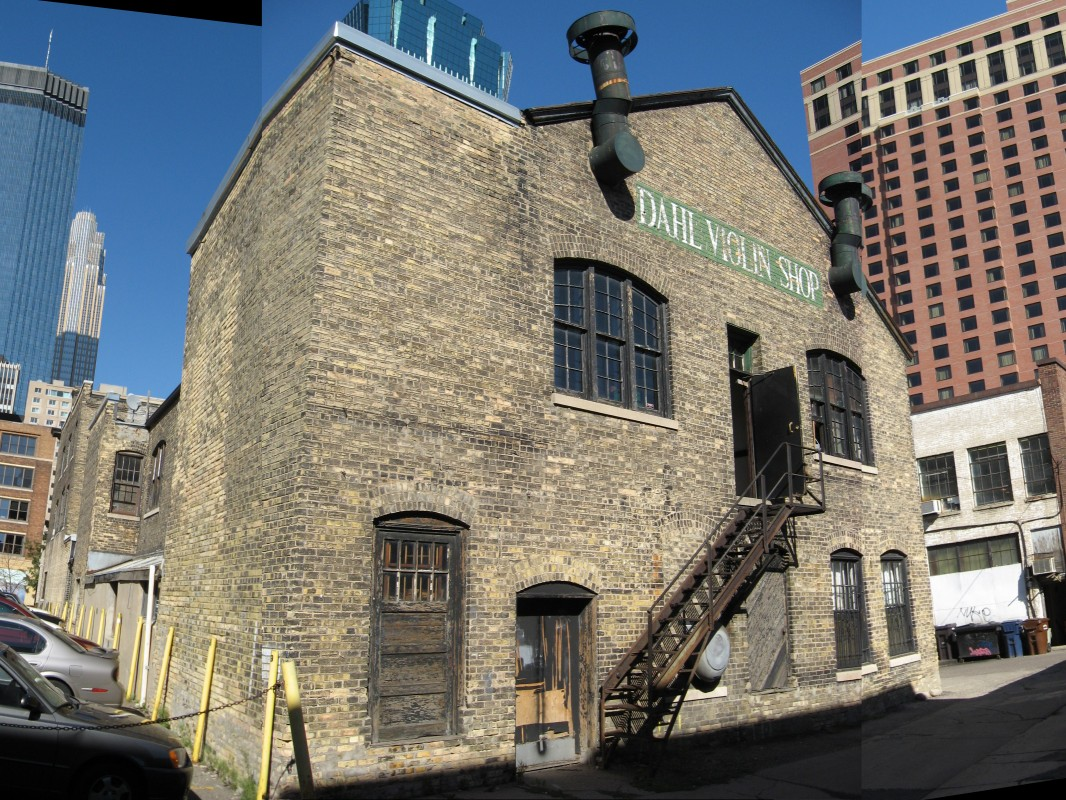
Back of the building

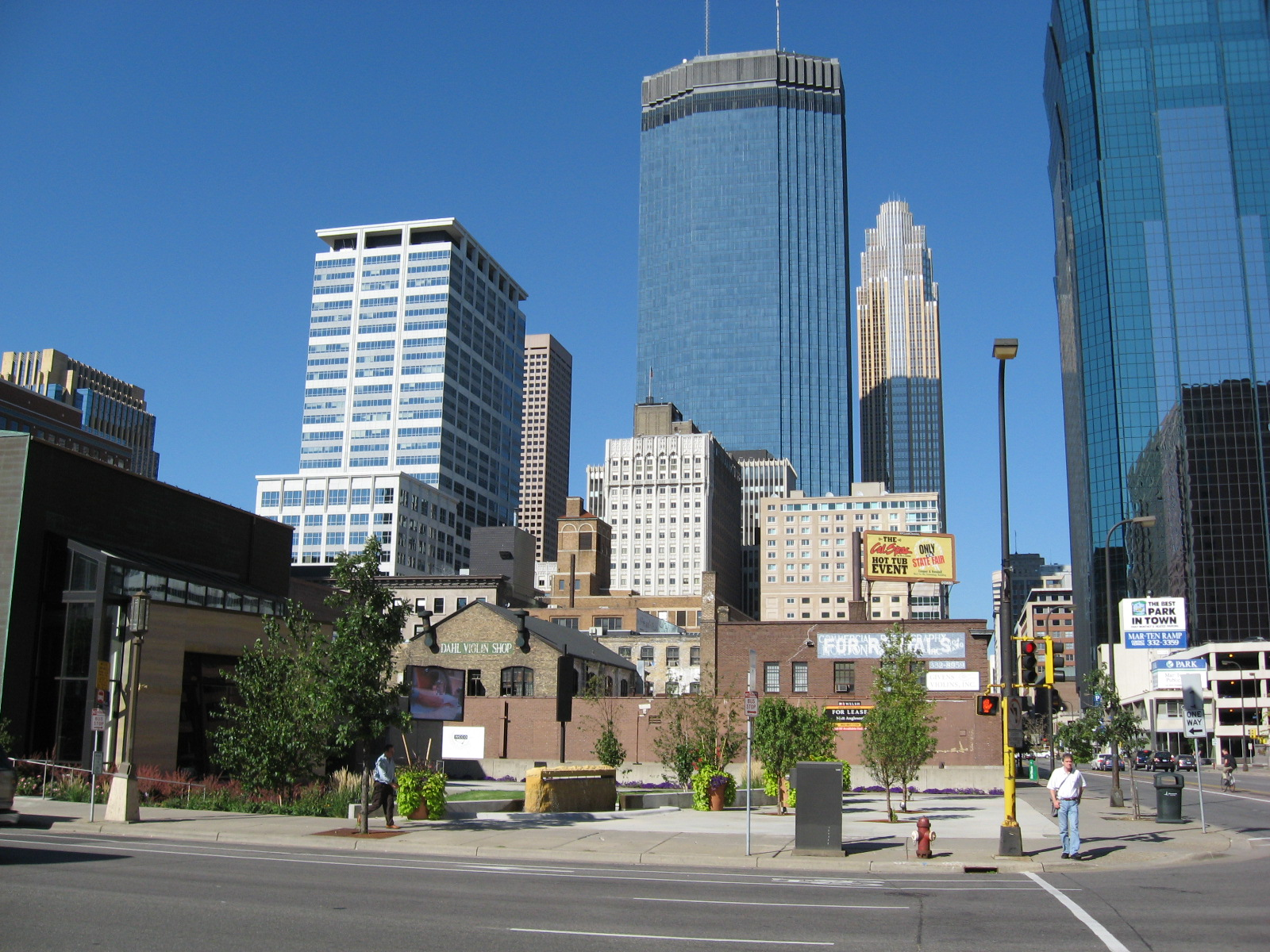
The building in context with downtown Minneapolis

The Handicraft Guild Building is located at 89 10th Street South, Minneapolis, Minnesota, United States to house the Handicraft Guild.

== History ==
The building was designed in 1907 by architect William Channing Whitney in the Georgian Revival/Arts & Crafts style. The building became a center of artistic activity, and had workshops for artists, classrooms, studios, a showroom, and an assembly hall which hosted lectures and special exhibits.

An addition to the Handicraft Guild was designed in 1914 by architects Edwin Hawley Hewitt and Edwin Brown at 1000-1006 Marquette Avenue South Minneapolis, Minnesota.

It was protected in 1998 by the Minneapolis Heritage Preservation Commission despite attempts by condominium developers to tear the building down. The building houses The Handicraft Guild; founded in 1904, an artist collective and gallery space, and prominent in the Arts in Minneapolis scene.

Early 1900s Arts and Crafts movement tile work can be found in suites throughout the building.

In 1998, the building was designated an Individual Landmark by the Minneapolis Heritage Preservation Commission.
