= Elbert L. Carpenter House =

Historic house in Minnesota, United States

- U.S. National Register of Historic Places
- Minneapolis Landmark
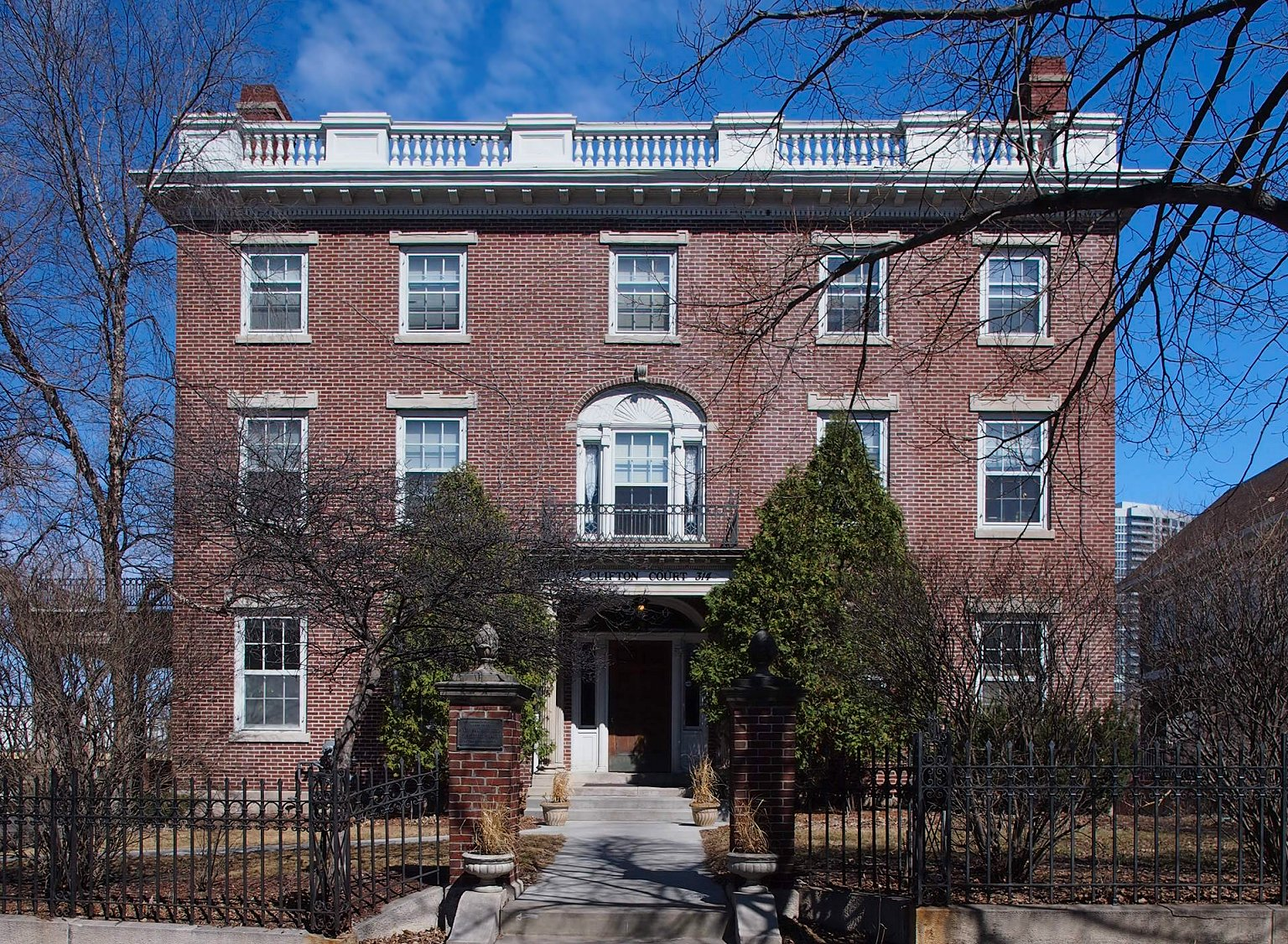
- The Elbert L. Carpenter House from the southwest

- Location within Minnesota Location within the United States
- Location: 314 Clifton Avenue, Minneapolis, Minnesota
- Coordinates: 44°57′59.1″N 93°17′2.5″W
- Area: Less than 1 acre
- Built: 1906
- Architect: William Channing Whitney
- Architectural style: Colonial Revival
- NRHP reference No.: 77000738

Significant dates
- Added to NRHP: September 13, 1977
- Designated MPLSL: 1978

The Elbert L. Carpenter House is a historic house in the Loring Park neighborhood of Minneapolis, Minnesota, United States. It was designed by notable local architect William Channing Whitney in the Colonial Revival style. The house is significant not only for its architecture, but also for its resident, a businessman in the lumber industry. Elbert Carpenter (1862–1945) helped to organize the Minneapolis Symphony Orchestra, now known as the Minnesota Orchestra. The Minneapolis Labor Review noted, "it was to him that everyone looked when stringent times in the world of work, trade and finance brought stringent times to the world of music. He never failed to respond with both financial support and ingenious plans for getting the Symphony through the storm of every depression."

The house was listed on the National Register of Historic Places in 1977. It was listed for its local significance in industry and music for Carpenter's achievements, and in architecture for its Georgian Revival design by William Channing Whitney.
