= Righteously Outrageous Twirling Corps =

American visual performance ensemble

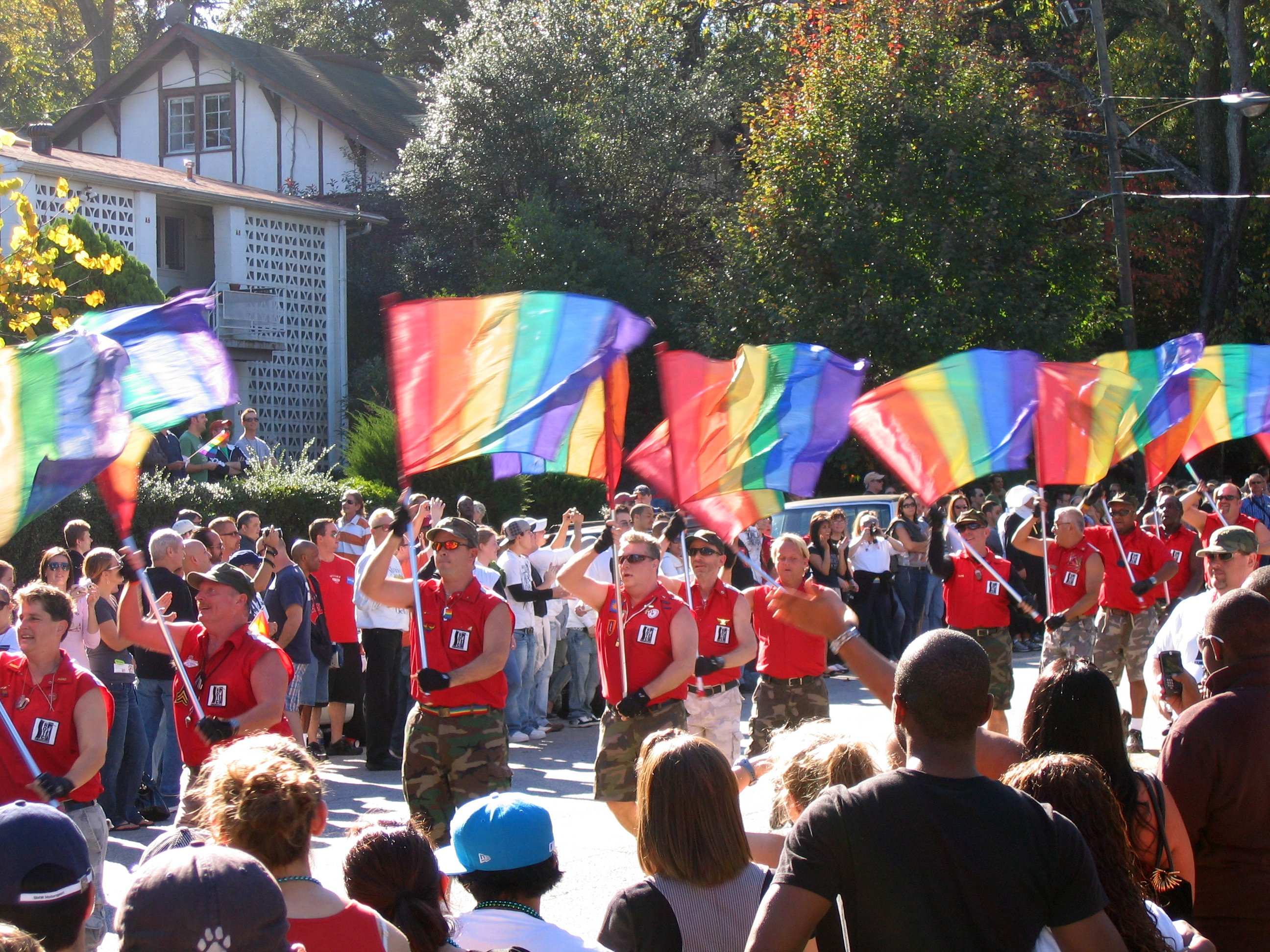
ROTC at Atlanta's Pride Parade, 2009

The Righteously Outrageous Twirling Corps is a Chicago-based visual performance ensemble of gay male volunteers. The name is a play on the Reserve Officer Training Corps. The group appears at gay events in Chicago. It also travels across the country to perform at various LGBTQ events.

The group was formed in 1992 by Ron Rubright, Bruce Linsmeyer and Chuck Henson, and was meant to provide light entertainment to gay pride parades that they felt were too serious.

Their uniform borrows elements from military garb (khaki or camouflage with black boots), but also includes camp elements, and members are encouraged to personalize their wardrobes. Although the group marches in unison and performs synchronized movements, the music is generally techno, disco, or a gay anthem. The group's performance consists of "a precision, military-style warm-up routine, and traditional routines to dance or disco music."

== See also ==
- List of LGBT-related organizations
- Cheer, Dorothy, Cheer!
