= D. R. Moon Memorial Library =

- Moon, D. R., Memorial Library
- U.S. National Register of Historic Places
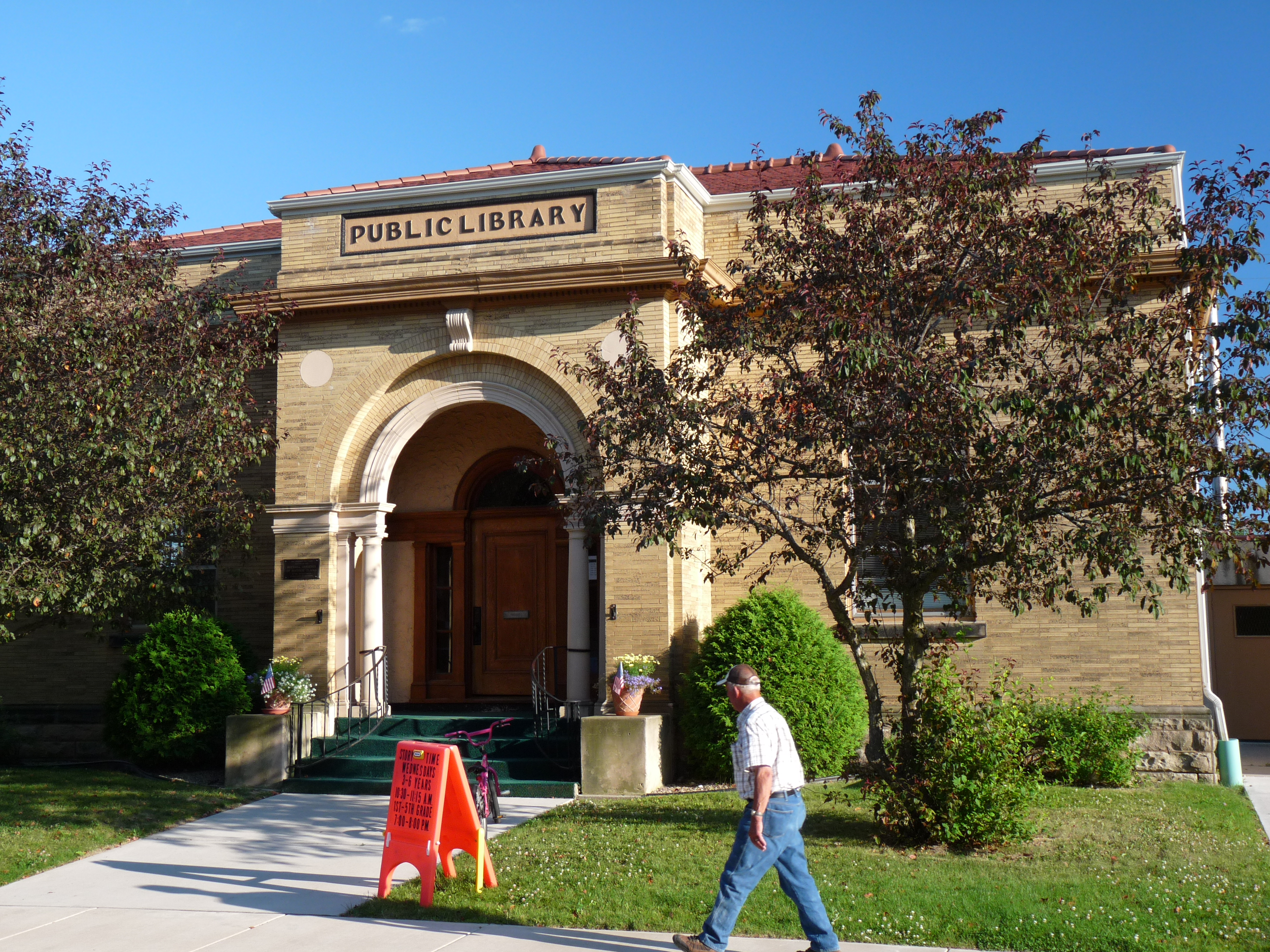

- Location within Wisconsin Location within the United States
- Location: E. Fourth Ave., Stanley, Wisconsin
- Coordinates: 44°57′44″N 90°56′7″W
- Area: less than one acre
- Built: 1901
- Architect: Whitney, W. Channing
- Architectural style: Classical Revival
- NRHP reference No.: 85003096
- Added to NRHP: December 2, 1985

D. R. Moon Memorial Library is a small public library donated in 1901 by the family of a lumber baron to the community of Stanley, Wisconsin. It was added to the National Register of Historic Places in 1985.

== History ==
In the late 1880s the Northwestern Lumber Company built a large sawmill in Stanley, under the direction of DeLos R. Moon, the company president at the time. In 1893 the company began to build the Stanley, Merrill and Phillips Railway, to haul lumber from Northwestern's holdings to the mill in Stanley. Altogether, Northwestern was the largest industry in Stanley, employing hundreds of men.

Moon died in 1898. Around that time, people began seriously discussing Stanley's need for a public library. Mrs. Sallie F. Moon, DeLos's widow, donated funds for the library as a memorial to her husband, and because of his affection for the community.

William Channing Whitney of Minneapolis designed the building in Neoclassical style, a compact 1-story building with T-shaped floor plan and hip roof. The front entrance is a round arch flanked by Doric columns. Inside are more Doric columns, dark oak ceiling beams, and a large brick fireplace with a plaque acknowledging the Moon family.

The library was dedicated in a ceremony on December 17, 1901, with a speech by DeLos' son Sumner and with remarks by F.A. Hutchins and Senator J.H. Stout of the State Library Commission. Hutchins "declared that for a building of its size, it had no equal in the state, and that the selection of books was the best he had seen." The initial selection of books was given by Mrs. Moon. To that, S.J. McNight, DeLos Moon's successor as president of Northwestern Lumber, donated another 500 books. These included reference books, history, travel, science, children's books, and books in Norwegian, for this community with a large Norwegian population.

Though computers and DVDs have been added inside, the building remains largely as originally designed, still serving the community.
