= Minneapolis Club =

Coordinates: 44°58′30″N 93°16′10″W

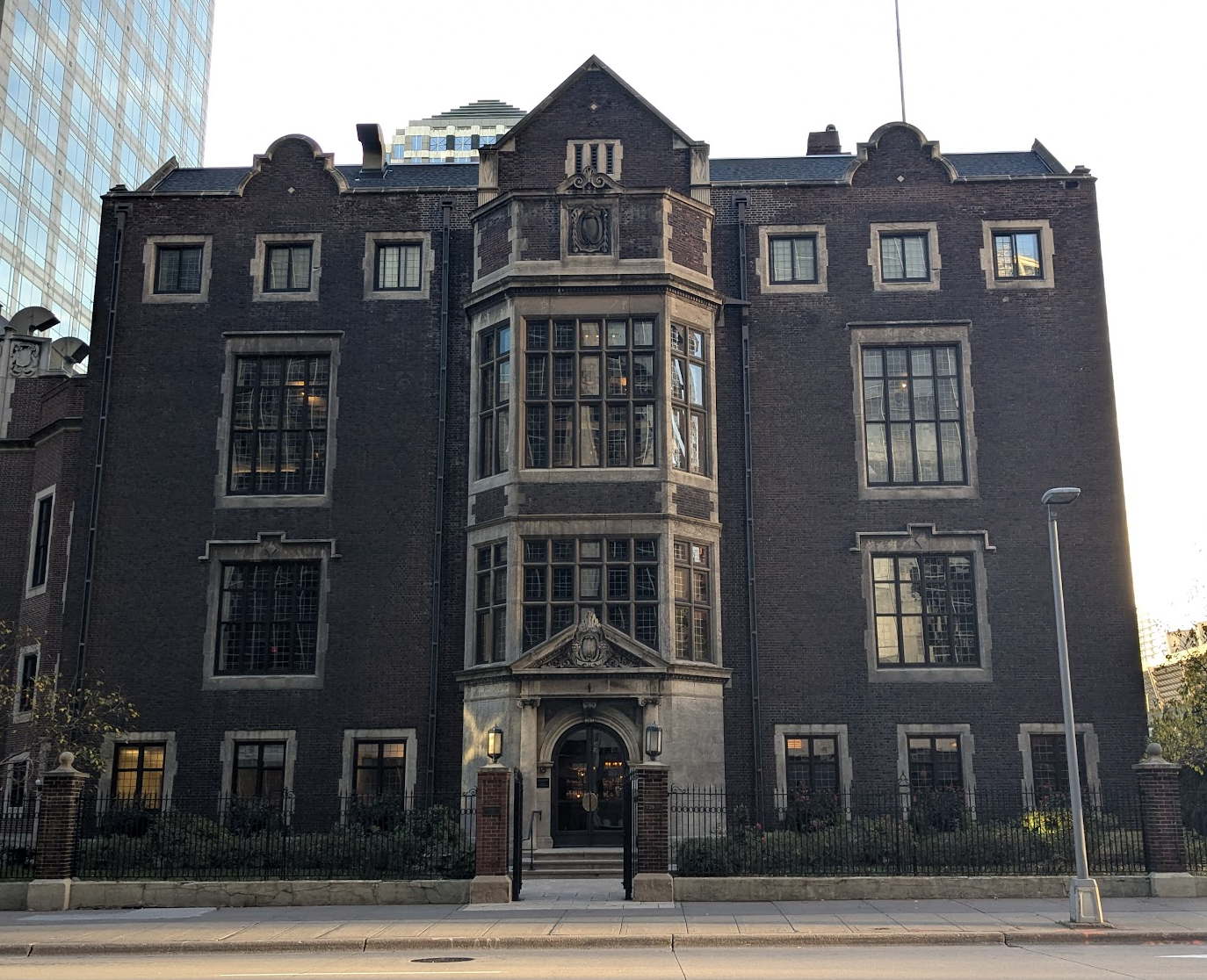
The Minneapolis Club in downtown Minneapolis, Minnesota.

The Minneapolis Club is a private club with its clubhouse at 729 Second Avenue South Minneapolis, Minnesota. The club operates under laws for 501(c)(7) Social and Recreation Clubs; in 2024 it claimed total revenue of $4,408,465 and total assets of $11,135,808.

== History ==
The Minneapolis Club was founded in 1883 by leading Minnesota business and civic leaders, including John Pillsbury and Charles Loring. In its first 25 years, the club changed locations three times. It has been headquartered in its present location, however, since its opening in 1909.

Throughout its history, the club has played host to prominent individuals visiting the Twin Cities. William Howard Taft stayed, and dined, at the club during his 1909 visit to the Twin Cities. Then-Colonel Theodore Roosevelt visited the club in 1901, just before becoming president. Carroll D. Wright, the US Commissioner of Labor, presented comments on the Coal Strike of 1902 at the club. In 1909, the Minneapolis banking establishment used the club to host Senator Nelson Aldrich of Rhode Island for a day-long forum on financial issues. James J. Hill, a member, hosted his 67th birthday at the club.

== Membership ==
Membership in the Minneapolis Club is by invitation only. The club does not, however, discriminate based on race, sex, national origin, or religion.

Notable members have included Supreme Court justice Harry Blackmun and Sol Smith Russell, the actor and comedian.

== Architecture ==
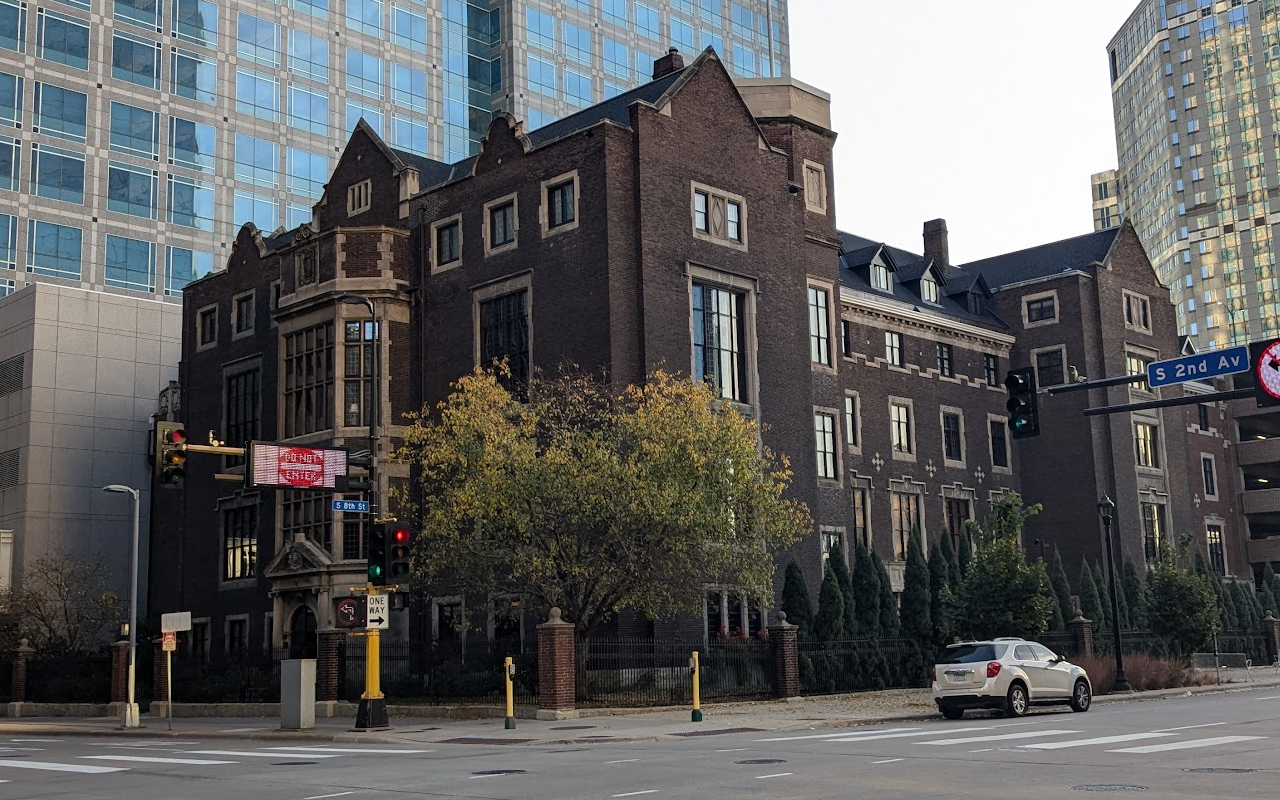
The Minneapolis Club, viewed from kitty-corner.

The Minneapolis Club is a brick building located in downtown Minneapolis. The present building was designed by Gordon, Tracy and Swartwout (New York) with William Channing Whitney and constructed in 1908. It was expanded in 1911 by Hewitt and Brown and again in 2002 by Setter Leach & Lindstrom.

== See also ==
- List of American gentlemen's clubs
