= William Channing Whitney =

American architect

- Born: April 11, 1851; Harvard, Massachusetts, U.S.
- Died: August 23, 1945 (aged 94); Minnesota, U.S.
- Education: Massachusetts Agricultural College (B.S.)
- Spouse: Alma Carter (died 1934)

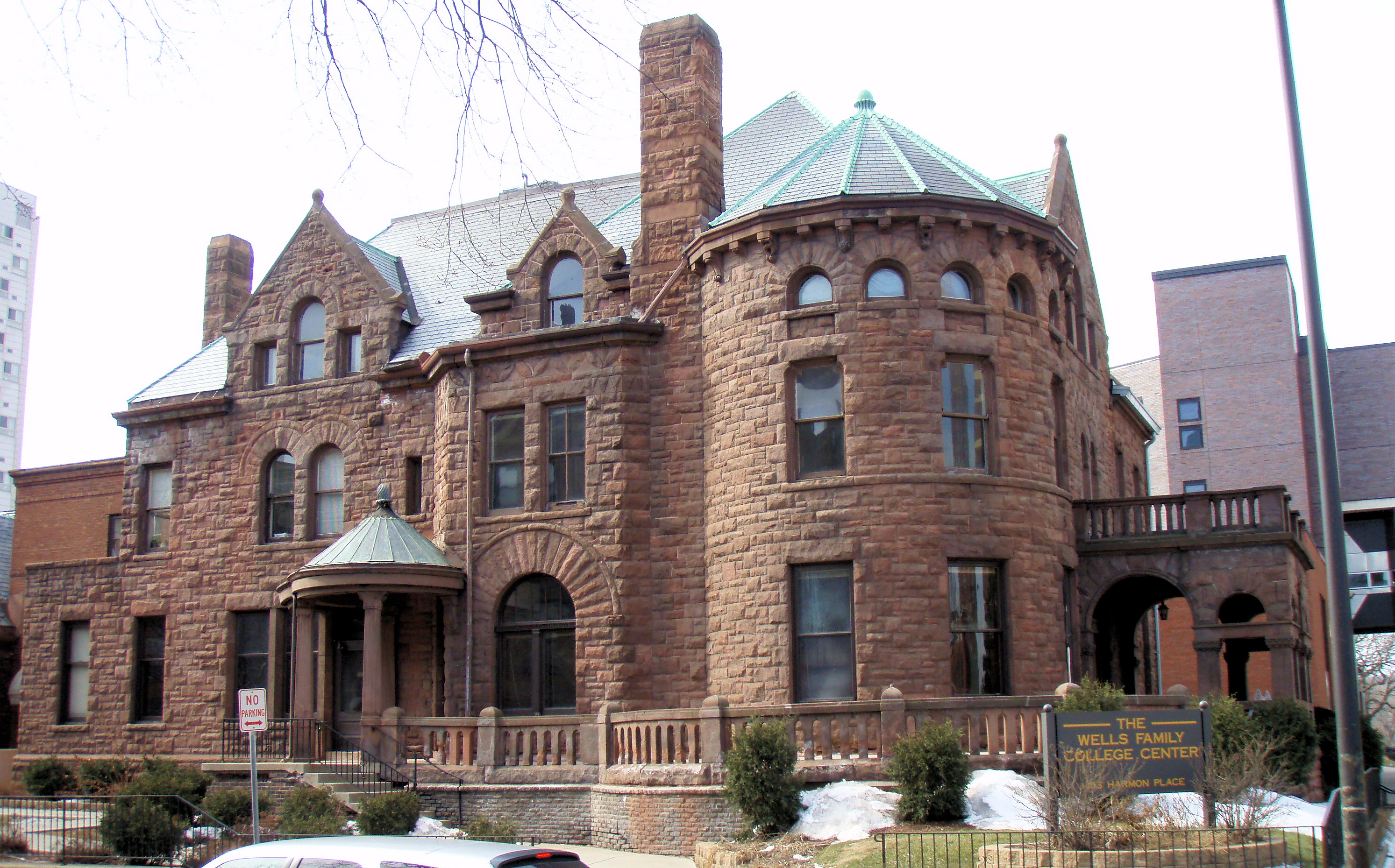
H. Alden Smith House

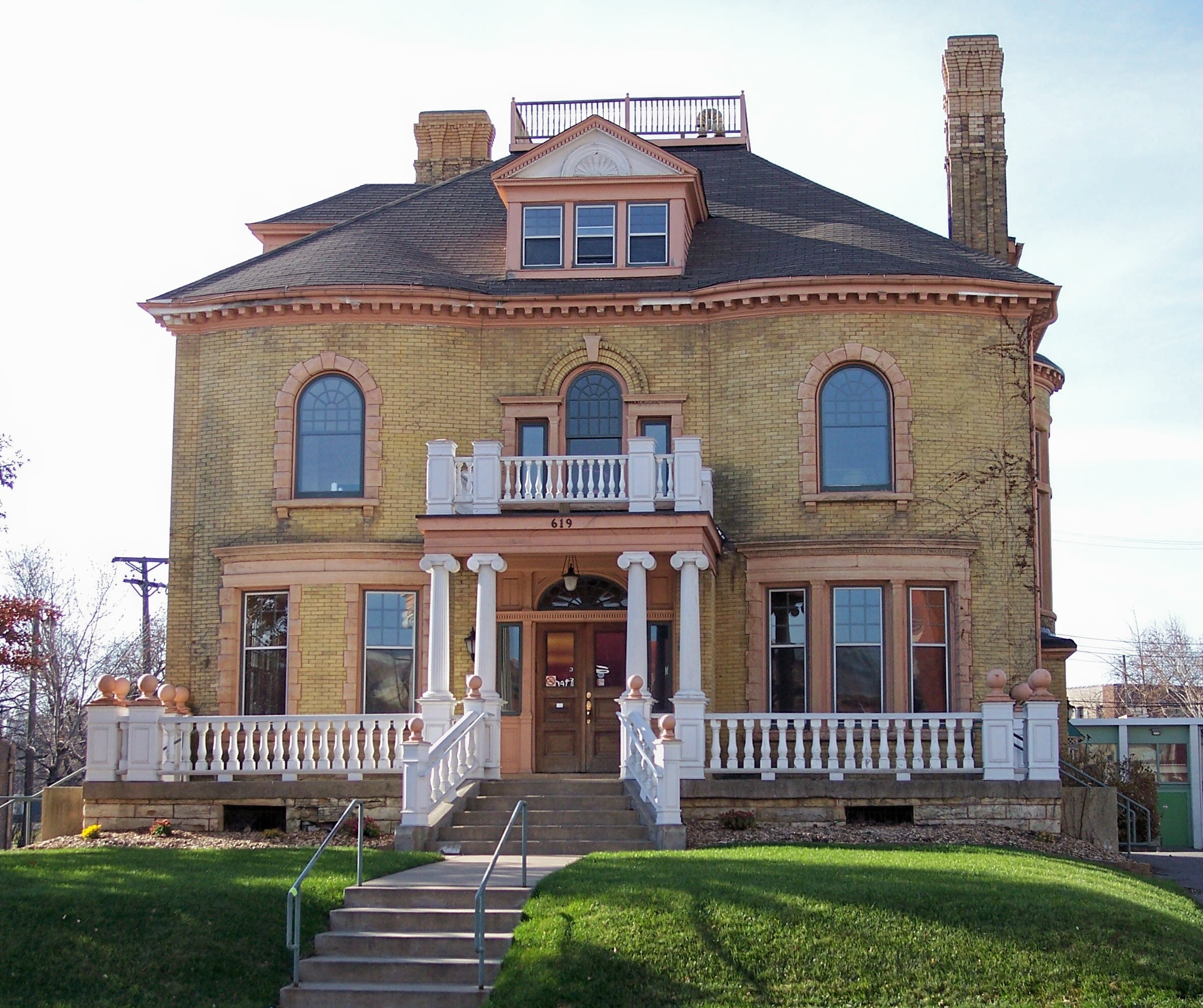
William H. Hinkle-Murphy House

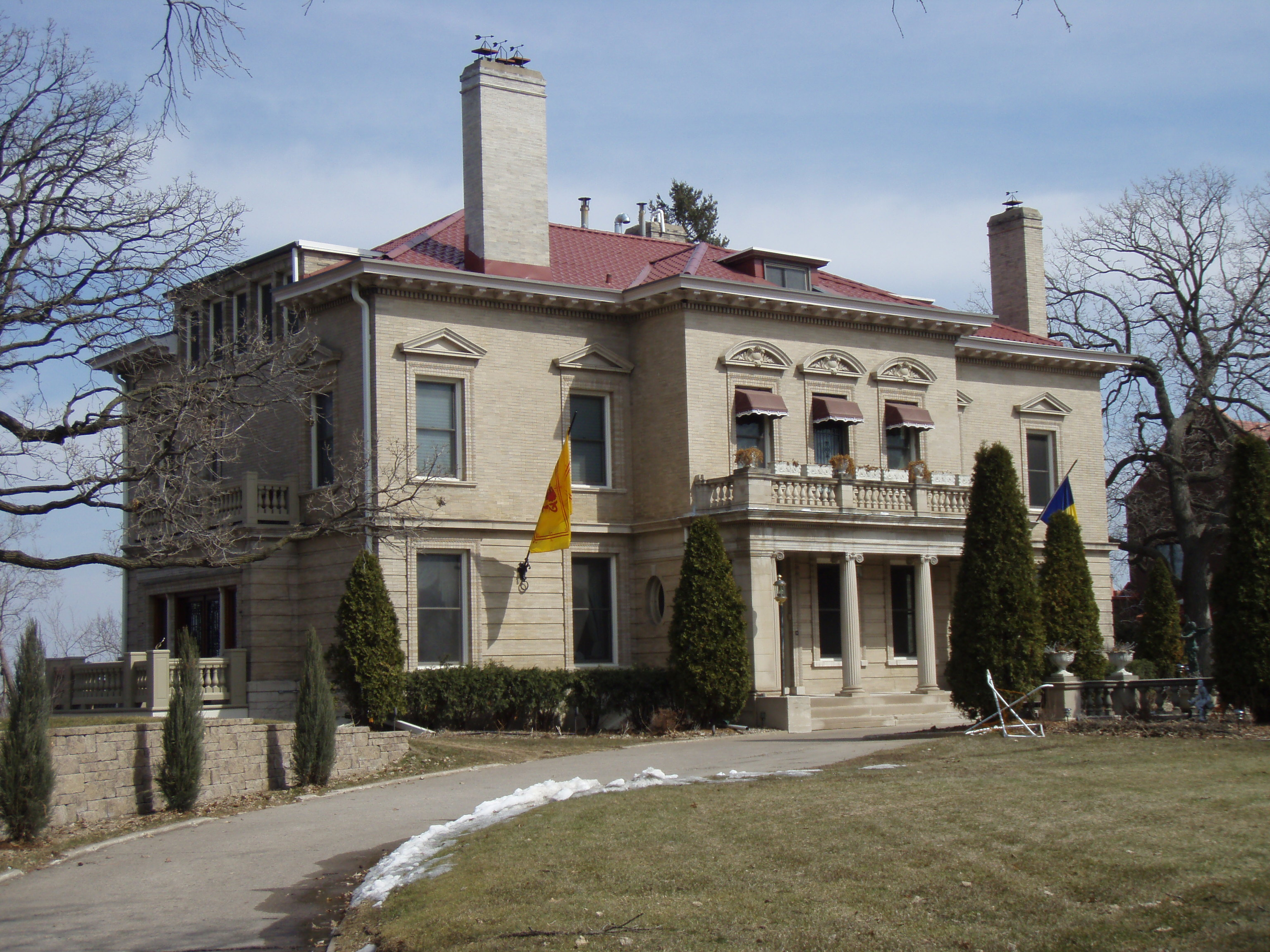
Charles J. Martin House

William Ellery Channing Whitney (April 11, 1851 – August 23, 1945) was an American architect who practiced in Minneapolis, Minnesota. He specialized primarily in domestic architecture, designing homes for many prominent Twin Cities families.

== Early life ==
Whitney was born in Harvard, Massachusetts on April 11, 1851. The son of Benjamin F. Whitney, he was educated at the Lawrence Academy at Groton and Massachusetts Institute of Technology. He received a Bachelor of Science from the Massachusetts Agricultural College in 1872.

== Career ==
Whitney worked in the Boston architectural office of William Ralph Emerson and Carl Fehmer for several years during the 1870s. After moving to Minneapolis in 1878, he formed an architectural partnership with James C. Plant which lasted six years. In 1885 he began to practice on his own and soon gained a reputation among the Minneapolis manufacturing and milling elite for his high-style residential designs. During his career he designed residences for Frank H. Peavey, James S. Bell, William H. Dunwoody, and others. The Saint Paul house he designed for Horace H. Irvine in 1911 is now the Minnesota Governor's Residence.

Whitney was known to be very style-conscious. He is credited with introducing the neo-Georgian style of architecture to Minneapolis with his design for the William J. Hinkle House in 1886. Within the tasteful exteriors that appealed to his upper-class patrons, Whitney's houses were full of modern innovations such as central vacuum cleaning plants, electrical refrigeration, and intercom systems. This allowed his houses to retain value after household staffing became less commonplace during the mid-twentieth century.

Whitney served on the board of trustees of the Minneapolis Society of Fine Arts from 1888 to 1896. As a prominent architect of Minneapolis, he was selected to design the Minnesota Building at the 1893 World's Columbian Exposition in Chicago. The structure was built under the impetus of the City Beautiful movement, whose aesthetic was expressed at the exposition's "White City." As a follower of the City Beautiful movement, Whitney was a strong proponent of city parks and ennobling urban schemes.

Whitney retired from practice in 1925. In his office were trained younger architects such as C.B. Chapman, Adam L. Dorr, and Serenus Colburn. He was a member of the American Institute of Architects.

== Family and personal life ==
Whitney married Alma C. Walker on October 6, 1881. The couple had two daughters, Marion (born August 19, 1882) and Katherine (born March 16, 1888).

== Notable houses ==
- Kate Dunwoody Hall, Minneapolis, 1882 or 1883. (Demolished)
- Eugene A. Merrill House, Minneapolis, 1884. (National Register of Historic Places)
- H. Alden Smith House, Minneapolis, 1886. (Richardsonian Romanesque; National Register of Historic Places)
- William H. Hinkle House, Minneapolis, 1886-1887. (Neo-Georgian; National Register of Historic Places)
- Hazen Burton "Chimo" Estate, Deephaven, 1890. (Eastlake Queen Anne)
- William G. Northup "BonSyde" Estate, Wayzata, 1894. (Greek Revival; demolished 2013)
- Frank H. Peavey "Highcroft" Estate, Wayzata, 1895. (Neo-Georgian; demolished 1953)
- Samuel Culbertson House, Louisville, Kentucky, 1897.
- Frank Heffelfinger House, Minneapolis, 1902.
- Charles J. Martin House, Minneapolis, 1903. (Renaissance Revival; National Register of Historic Places)
- William Dunwoody House, Minneapolis, 1905. (Demolished 1967)
- Elbert L. Carpenter House, Minneapolis, 1906. (Neo-Georgian; National Register of Historic Places)
- John Lind House, Minneapolis, 1907. (Neo-Georgian)
- James S. Bell "Belford" Estate, Wayzata, 1908. (Mediterranean Revival)
- Horace H. Irvine House, Saint Paul, 1910-1911. (English Tudor; National Register of Historic Places)

== Other commissions ==
- Dyer Music Store, Minneapolis, 1884.
- Minneapolis Club, Minneapolis, 1892.
- Minnesota Building at the World's Columbian Exposition, Chicago, 1893.
- D. R. Moon Memorial Library, Stanley, Wisconsin, 1901.
- Lafayette Club, Minnetonka Beach, 1906 (burned 1922).
- Handicraft Guild Building, Minneapolis, 1907.
