= Henrietta Barclay Paist =

American china painter

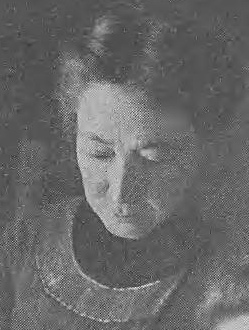
- Born: 1870; Red Wing, Minnesota
- Died: 1930 (aged 59–60); Ramsey County, Minnesota

Henrietta Barclay Paist (1870–1930) was an American artist, designer, teacher, and author. She is perhaps best known for her china painting, a popular turn-of-the-century pastime.

== Biography ==
Born in Red Wing, Minnesota in 1870, she studied ceramics in Germany, watercolor painting in Minneapolis, and design in Chicago before settling in the Twin Cities, where she also found time to marry and raise a family.

Internationally recognized, Paist won the gold medal in 1896 at Chicago's National Exhibition of Ceramic Workers for a collection of painted porcelain and garnered an award for a portrait on porcelain at the 1900 Paris Exposition. Over her long career, she exhibited work in the Twin Cities, Chicago, New York, and Detroit. Her nineteenth-century pieces, typical of the popular Realistic style, focused on flora and fauna, while her twentieth-century work rendered many of the same subjects in the more stylized manner of the Arts and Crafts movement.

She also taught at the St. Paul Institute of Arts and Sciences (forerunner of the Science Museum of Minnesota), published watercolor studies and designs for pitchers, vases, and plate borders, and served as a porcelain judge at the Minnesota State Fair for more than twenty years. A member of the Twin City Keramic Club, she was also a frequent contributor and assistant editor of the national magazine for china painters, Keramic Studio. She was also involved with the Handicraft Guild in Minneapolis.

Paist died on February 11, 1930, in Ramsey County.
