= Minnesota Governor's Residence =

Historic house in Minnesota, United States

- Horace Hills Irvine House
- U.S. National Register of Historic Places
- U.S. Historic district – Contributing property
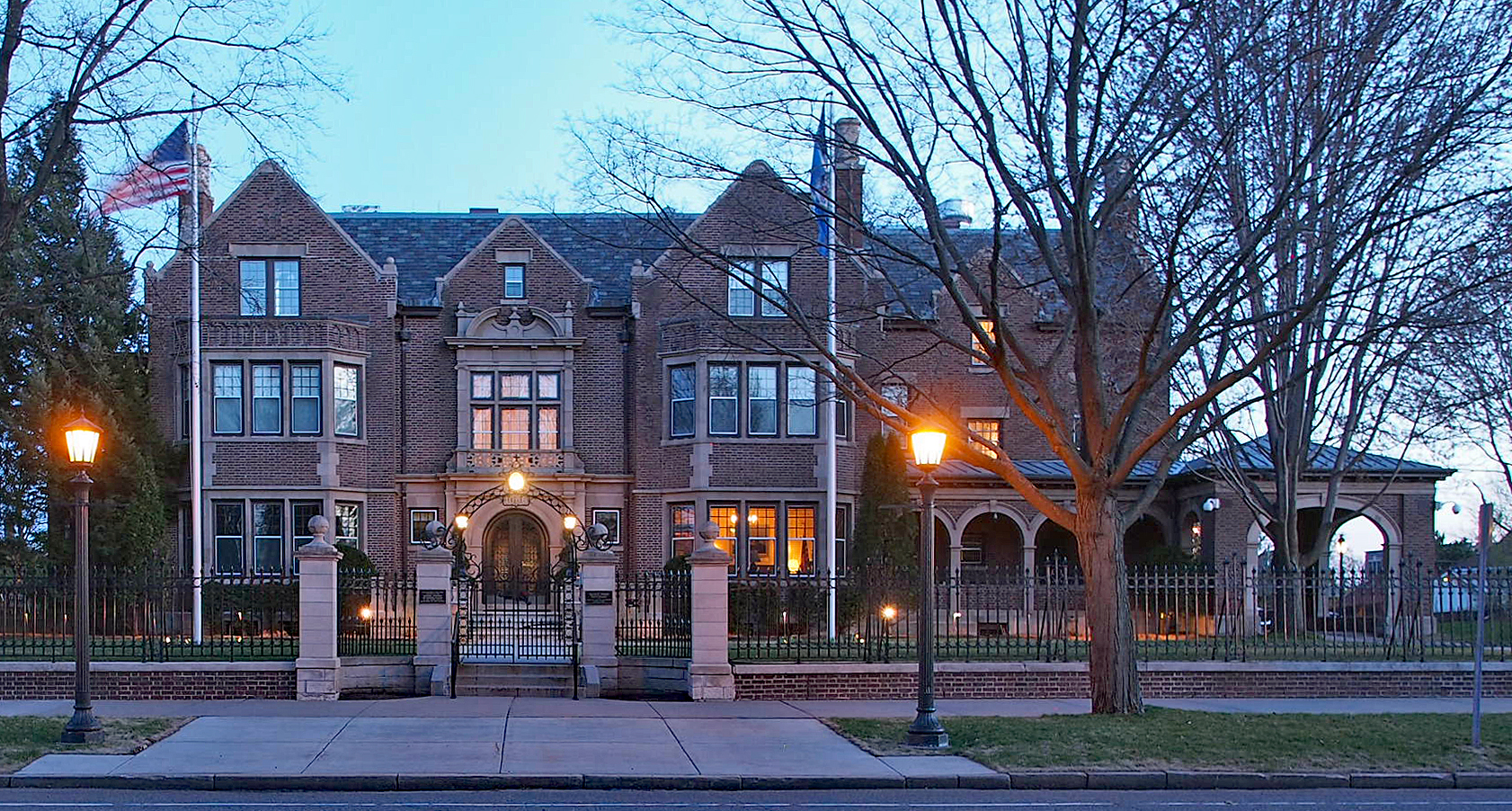
- The Governor's Residence in 2015.

- Location within Minnesota Location within the United States
- Interactive map showing the location of the Minnesota Governor’s Residence
- Location: 1006 Summit Avenue, Saint Paul, Minnesota
- Coordinates: 44°56′27.7″N 93°8′34.5″W
- Built: 1910
- Architect: William Channing Whitney
- Part of: Historic Hill District (ID76001067)
- NRHP reference No.: 74001034
- Added to NRHP: December 16, 1974

The Minnesota Governor's Residence, informally referred to as the Governor's Mansion, serves as the official home of the governor of the U.S. state of Minnesota. The house, located at 1006 Summit Avenue in Saint Paul, is on 1.5 acres (0.61 ha) of land. The building is slightly more than 16,000 square feet (1,500 m^{2}) in size.

== Description ==
The house was designed by Minneapolis architect William Channing Whitney for Saint Paul lumber businessman Horace Hills Irvine and his family. The 20-room English Tudor house has nine bedrooms, eight bathrooms, and nine fireplaces. The Irvine family lived in the home from 1912 until 1965, when the Irvines' youngest daughters, Clotilde Irvine Moles and Olivia Irvine Dodge, donated it to the people of Minnesota to serve as the official residence of the First Family.

The Minnesota Legislature in 1965 passed a law accepting the donation and designating the house as the State Ceremonial Building for official public use for state ceremonial functions and as a governor's residence. The law placed the house and its management under the jurisdiction of the Minnesota Department of Administration. From 1965 until 1980, governors were permitted to propose changes to the house. The Legislature provided renovation funds and the Department of Administration supervised the improvements. From 1965 to 1967, a committee assisted with furnishing the house, but the governor retained the authority to make changes.

In 1974, the house was listed on the National Register of Historic Places. With this designation, any renovation to the exterior of the residence must be reviewed and approved by the State Historic Preservation Office of the Minnesota Historical Society. It is also a contributing property to the Historic Hill District.

Every year, a forester from the Minnesota Department of Natural Resources selects a giant Christmas tree, harvested from a Minnesota State Forest, often from near Pine City, to adorn the front lawn during the holiday season.

== Governor's Residence Council and staff ==
In 1980, in an effort to establish more consistent management for the house, the Legislature authorized the State Ceremonial Building Council. In 1983, the name was changed to the Governor's Residence Council.

The council has 19 members: the Commissioner of Administration, the governor's spouse, the executive director of the Arts Board, the director of the Minnesota Historical Society, one member each from the Minnesota House of Representatives and the Minnesota Senate, and 13 members appointed by the governor. The council develops restoration plans, approves alterations, and solicits contributions for improvements or furnishings for public areas of the building.

There are five staff members at the mansion: a manager, an assistant manager, a chef, a housekeeper, and a groundskeeper. At times during the summer, Minnesota Historical Society offers tours free of charge to the public.

Starting in 2023, the Summit Avenue mansion had undergone upgrades to improve security features and to update electrical, plumbing and foundation systems. The project was due to cost about $13 million funded by taxpayers.

== Halloween ==
Every year, the Residence hands out candy on Halloween.
