= Skewed Visions =

Skewed Visions is an arts company headquartered in Minneapolis, Minnesota which produces site-specific performances and other multimedia works. Formed in 1996, by the artists Charles Campbell, Gülgün Kayim and Sean Kelley-Pegg, the group produces site-specific works that have sometimes been seen as controversial. The group may be best known for The Car, a 2000 performance that took place in cars driven by actors with the audience as passengers. Additionally, Skewed Visions has created original performances for a variety of sites including theaters, office buildings, a rooftop observatory, a former marble factory, a house, a storefront window, a former bombsite factory, a pedestrian shopping mall, and a farmer's market.

The company received project grants from the Jerome Foundation, most recently in 2005, and has also received grants from the Minnesota Metropolitan Regional Arts Council, The Minnesota State Arts Board, and the McKnight Foundation. In October 2006, Skewed Visions appeared alongside Meredith Monk and Stephan Koplowitz as keynote speakers for the first Site-Specific Performance Symposium at the Martin E. Segal Theatre Center of the Graduate Center of CUNY. The company's production of Jasper Johns was made with the support of the National Endowment for the Arts's American Masterpieces initiative.

The company's work has also been the subject of articles in academic journals, frequently focusing on "expanding notions of theater and performance." These include New Theatre Quarterly, TDR, and Frakcija.

== Company Members ==
Charles Campbell -Co-Founder, Artistic/Managing Director
Gülgün Kayim -Co-Founder, Artistic Associate
Sean Kelley-Pegg -Co-Founder, Artistic Associate

== Awards ==
1998 Untitled #1, Best of the Year, St. Paul Pioneer Press
2003 The Orange Grove, Outstanding Experimental Work, Star Tribune
2004 The House, Best Experimental Work, Star Tribune
2004 The City Itself, Best of the Year, City Pages
2004 Artists of the Year, City Pages
2006 Days and Nights, Top Ten show, City Pages
2007 Strange Love (device/performance), Outstanding Experimental Theater Work
2012 Black Water, Best of 2011-2012

== Shows ==
1997: Camille
1997: The Eye in the Door, Part One: Urban Sirens
1998: Untitled #1
1998: The Eye in the Door, Part Two: Breakfast of Champions
1999: The Eye in the Door, Part Three: The Bicycle
2000: The City Itself, Part One: The Car
2001: You Are Here
2003: The Orange Grove (review 1; review 2)
2004: Pipes (review)
2004: The City Itself series: The Car, The Sidewalk and The House (review1; review 2)
2006: Days and Nights series: A Quiet Ambition, Time For Bed and The Hidden Room (review 1; review 2; review 3)
2007: Strange Love (Device/Performance) (review 1; review 2; review 3; review 4)
2008: Jasper Johns (review)
2009: He Woke Up In A Strange Place Called Home And Although Looking For Bed He Kept Finding Death Instead (review 1; review 2)
2012: Black Water (review)
2013: Invisible City (review)
2014: EX (review)
2016: EX(remade)
2016: Losing Kantor
2017: APPETITE
