= Handicraft Guild =

The Handicraft Guild was an organization central to the Arts and Crafts movement, active in Minneapolis, Minnesota, United States from 1904 to 1918. The Handicraft Guild was founded, led, and staffed primarily by women, making it historically significant to women's art movements nationwide.

== History ==
The Arts and Crafts movement in Minneapolis valued patience, cooperation, and knowledge, as well as populism and democratic access to the arts. The Minneapolis Arts and Crafts Society was organized in 1899 in Minneapolis, building upon the Chalk and Chisel Club, an organization of woodcarvers and designers founded by Gertrude J. Leonard and Nellie Trufant which had held Minnesota's first arts and crafts exhibit in 1898. It was founded by Emma Roberts, a Minneapolis public schools arts instructor. The movement appealed to women and men who were of European descent and part of the emerging urban middle class.

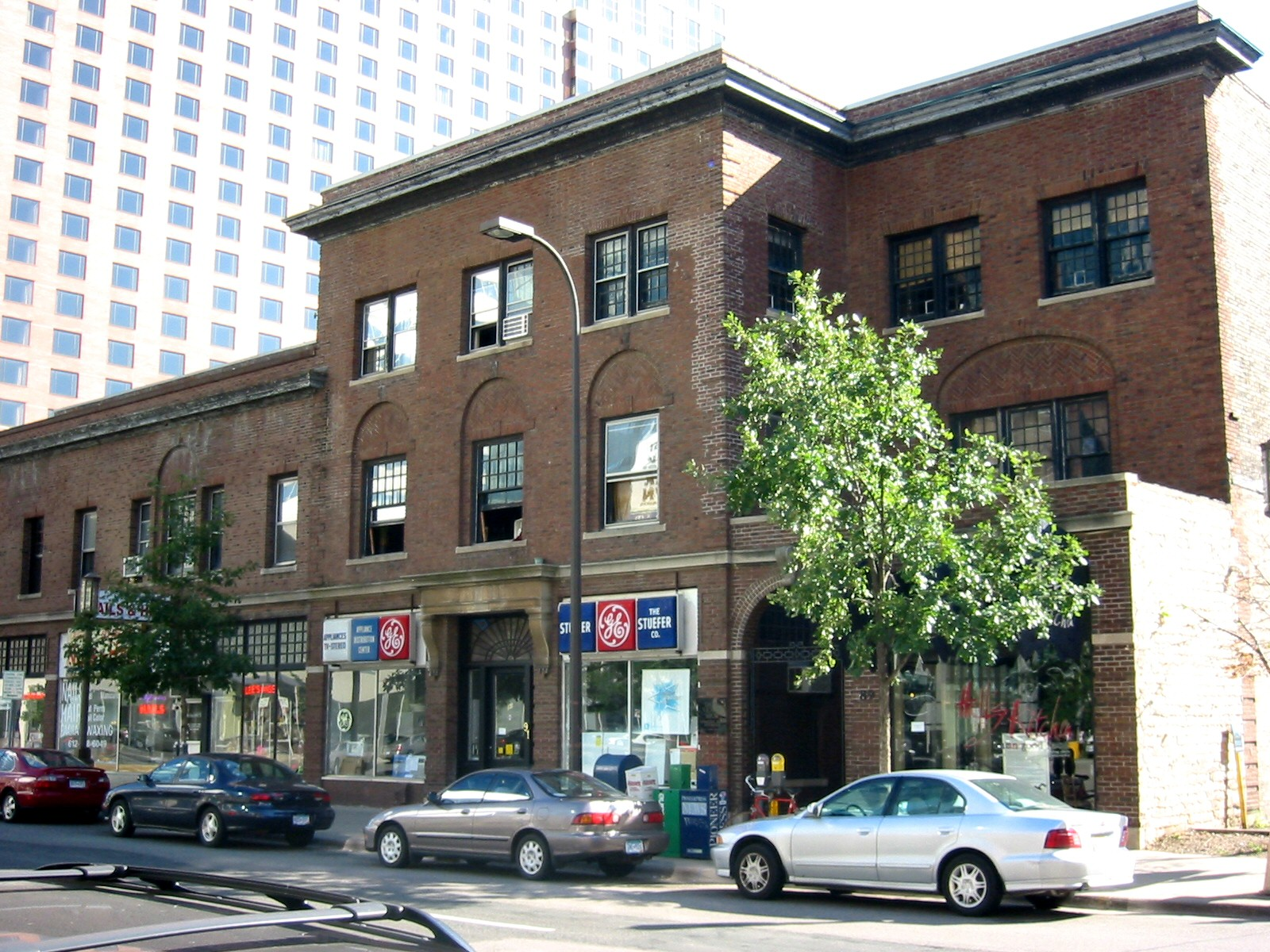
The Handicraft Guild building, built 1907.

The Handicraft Guild was founded to give local artists and teachers access to the skills necessary to teach crafts in public schools. It was founded in 1904 by eleven women as a Nicollet Avenue showroom which soon began offering classes and workshops. The Guild was an egalitarian school with the mission "to encourage the production of artistic handicraft, to establish mutual and helpful relationships between designer and craftsman, and to stimulate the appreciation of harmony and fitness in design."

In 1905, the Guild officially incorporated an began offering successful summer school courses. Linton Bookwalter, an interior designer, and Ernest Batchelder, a renowned tile maker, were two artists involved with the summer courses. The Guild moved to a larger space in 1907 to a new building designed by William Channing Whitney, and became a center of artistic activity in Minneapolis. The new building included workshops, classrooms, studios, a showroom, and an assembly hall.

The Guild was dissolved in 1918 and absorbed by the Art Education department at the University of Minnesota. Ruth Raymond, the Guild president at the time, served as the chair of the new department until her retirement in 1947.

== Description ==
The Guild created stone and metal art works. Its pupils included Grant Wood. It sold handmade metalwork, ceramics, leather, jewelry, and hand-bound books.

A group of artists located in the building adopted the Handicraft Guild name after the turn of the 21st century, though an artistic community had been consistently present in the Handicraft Guild Building and its adjacent buildings since prior to 1973. In 2015, the city demolished multiple connecting buildings, initially founded by the Handicraft Guild, to make room for an apartment building, displacing several art-related businesses and collectives.

The Handicraft Guild Building is located at 89 10th Street South, Minneapolis, Minnesota and still stands today thanks to the efforts of the Minneapolis Heritage Preservation Commission. The building is now part of the City Lights Apartments high rise and is used as a brewpub.

Correspondence, photographs, and general research about topics, organizations, and individuals involved in or associated with the Handicraft Guild of Minneapolis are held by the Minnesota Historical Society.

== Notable alumni ==
- Amy Robbins Ware (1877-1929), author
- Henrietta Barclay Paist (1870–1930), china painter
