= Cheer, Dorothy, Cheer! =

US non-profit organization

- Cheer Dorothy Cheer! at Milwaukee's PrideFest, 2007
- Founded: 2002
- Location: Minneapolis, Minnesota
- Website: cheerdorothycheer.com

Cheer, Dorothy, Cheer! is a non-profit organization based in Minneapolis, Minnesota (United States). The organization was founded by three gay men in 2002 to promote diversity, raise HIV/AIDS awareness, and raise money for other non-profit organizations.

The performance group has grown to include six performers: Shayne, Carlos, Nate, David, Dennis and Marc. The group members perform in cheerleader costumes with each costume highlighted by one of the colors of the Rainbow Flag—red, orange, yellow, green, blue, and purple. The routines are highly choreographed numbers in the style of female competitive cheerleaders or dancelines, generally set to campy or iconically gay musical numbers (such as Britney Spears songs) and often interspersed with quotes from The Wizard of Oz and other movies. The group frequently performs at gay and AIDS related events in the upper Midwestern United States. A portion of funds raised at performances are donated to organizations "that promote gay, lesbian and transgender diversity as well as AIDS awareness" with a primary recipient being Park House, an HIV day-clinic.

While the men wear costumes styled after typical female cheerleader outfits (including miniskirt and pom-pons), they are not female impersonators or drag queens. They make no effort to hide the fact that they are male (several wear goatees or other facial hair).

In addition to campy dance and musical performances referencing gay icons at events from Milwaukee's Pridefest to the Twin Cities Pride Parade the troupe also hosts community events including emceeing trans and genderqueer events, headlining the National Coming Out Week Annual Gender-Bender Drag Show at Minnesota State University and the Minnesota Red Ribbon Ride AIDS fundraiser.

In 2007 Cheer, Dorothy, Cheer! registered as a non-profit organization and received a Lavender Pride Award for "bringing laughter and awareness about issues of HIV and diversity."

== See also ==
- Gender bender
- Queer
- Righteously Outrageous Twirling Corps
