= List of Hennepin County Library branches =

List of libraries in Hennepin County in Minnesota, US

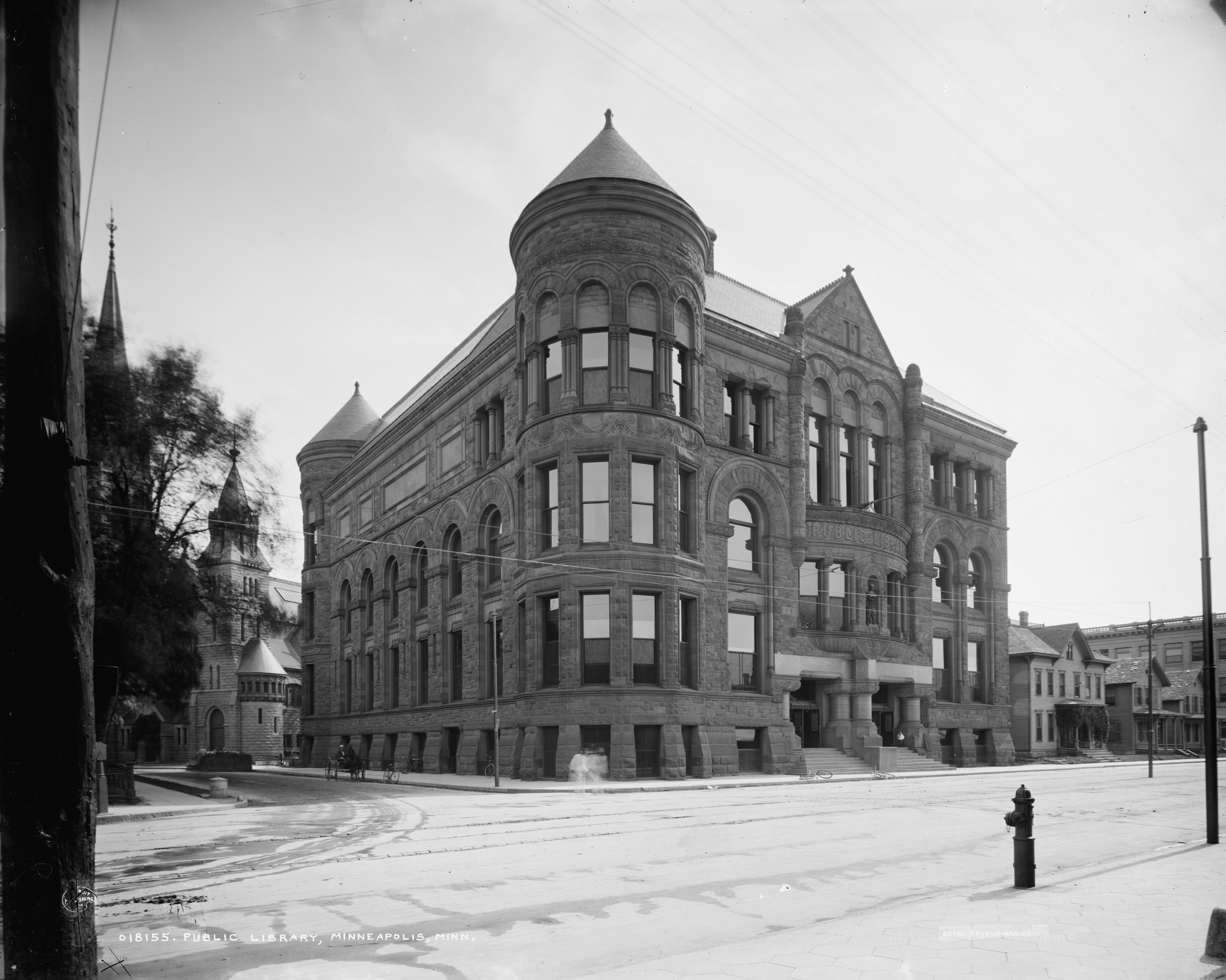
Original Minneapolis Public Library building from the early 1900s

The Hennepin County Library, which serves Hennepin County, Minnesota, including the city of Minneapolis, consists of 41 branches in 24 cities and towns. Of these, 15 are in Minneapolis; collectively they made up the Minneapolis Public Library until they were absorbed by the Hennepin system in the merger. Four branches (Central, Franklin, Hosmer, and Sumner) were originally founded as Carnegie libraries. Several other libraries, separate from the system, also operate within the county's boundaries.

Many of the branches of the current library system were established by entities other than the system itself. The Minneapolis Public Library was founded in 1885 to serve Minneapolis, the county's largest city. It opened its first two branches in 1890. During the 1890s, many areas of Minnesota, especially rural zones, lacked free libraries. Over the course of the decade a patchwork of private and legislative efforts sought to deal with the dearth. The city of Hopkins established its own independent library system in 1912; in 1913, other Minnesota cities including Wayzata and Robbinsdale were recorded as having library associations or clubs of their own.

Hennepin County established a library service of its own in early 1922, which entailed taking control of some of the smaller cities' branches (including Robbinsdale's) as well as the creation of a bookmobile which was scheduled to run nine routes per month by 1926. In 1934, Minneapolis was awarded a $125,000 endowment from the Carnegie Corporation for four branch buildings. By the mid-1950s, there were 25 branch libraries, and the bookmobile reached 1,300 families.

The Hennepin County Library board was established as a separate entity in 1965 as a building initiative to serve the rest of the county. The two library boards first discussed the idea of a merger in 1967. Due to concerns about properly serving the residents and city of Minneapolis, the merger debate ended in 1974, keeping both groups separate. In 2007, the merger was revisited and the Minneapolis Public Library officially joined the Hennepin County Library system at the beginning of 2008.

== Extant libraries ==
Extant Hennepin County Libraries
Name	City	Coordinates	Image	Opened	Notes	Ref(s).
Arvonne Fraser	Minneapolis	44.980996°N 93.237729°W	A one-story 1970s-style bank building	1967	Replaced the former Pillsbury branch, which had opened in 1904 as the second branch of the library. Name changed from Southeast in 2019 in honor of Arvonne Fraser.	
Augsburg Park	Richfield	44.874009°N 93.278762°W	Augsburg Park Library, a one-story beige stone building in 2014	1974	Renovated in 1988 and 2013	
Brookdale	Brooklyn Center	45.0658711°N 93.310626°W	A stone-and-glass building with a cylindrical glass rotunda	1981	Originally built in 1965 after a bookmobile served the community for a number of years.	
Brooklyn Park	Brooklyn Park	45.111031°N 93.355819°W	A modernist metal-and-glass building with a large covered entryway	2016	Replaced 1976 library	
Champlin	Champlin	45.174871°N 93.394151°W	A single-story brick library with a tall front entrance on a clear summer day, pictured 2013	1994	Replaced earlier 1921 and 1973 Champlin Libraries	
East Lake	Minneapolis	44.948056°N 93.231944°W	East Lake Library, a tall, glassy one-story building	2007	Replaced earlier 1924 and 1976 East Lake Libraries	
Eden Prairie	Eden Prairie	44.850413°N 93.427876°W	Eden Prairie Library, a brick building with a huge semicircular gray metal covering over its entryway, pictured in 2011	2004	Replaced 1973 Eden Prairie Reading Center and 1986 Eden Prairie Community Library	
Edina	Edina	44.908081°N 93.356102°W	Edina Library, a brick building with an arched entryway and a rectangular concrete pavilion over the entrance	2004	Originally opened in a schoolhouse in 1921. First permanent location was established in 1968, and the library remained there until its 2004 move.	
Excelsior	Excelsior	44.901625°N 93.567616°W	Excelsior Library, a modern brick building with three large street-facing windows and a glass entrance over which the word "Library" is imprinted in cement.	2014	Replaced 1965 Excelsior Library	
Franklin	Minneapolis	44.962984°N 93.255847°W	Franklin Library, an ornate Renaissance Revival library of two stories	1914	Listed on the National Register of Historic Places	
Golden Valley	Golden Valley	44.988222°N 93.379332°W	Golden Valley branch, a one-story brick building located in a grove of trees.	1971	Renovated in 2015–2016	
Hopkins	Hopkins	44.925462°N 93.414229°W	Hopkins, a one-story glass and brick building from the front on a sunny summer day	1968	Replaced earlier incarnations at Hopkins City Hall, Dow House (to which it moved in 1948), and an empty restaurant (to which it moved in 1963)	
Hosmer	Minneapolis	44.937507°N 93.270579°W	Hosmer Library, a dark brown brick building with parapets, in early spring	1916	Listed on the National Register of Historic Places	
Linden Hills	Minneapolis	44.925029°N 93.316511°W	Linden Hills Library, a Tudor Revival brick building	1931	Replaced rented Lake Harriet Commercial Club Building space. Listed on the National Register of Historic Places.	
Long Lake	Long Lake	44.9856282°N 93.5722919°W	Long Lake Library, a storefront in a strip mall.	1995	Replaced several spaces serving the area since 1913	
Maple Grove	Maple Grove	45.101962°N 93.441235°W	Maple Grove branch, a modern cream-colored building.	2010	Replaced nearby 1987 building	
Maple Plain	Maple Plain	45.007768°N 93.655487°W	Maple Plain Library, a one-story white building with a blue sloped roof and a teal, arched entryway.	1973	Replaced several locations providing service to the area since 1922	
Minneapolis Central	Minneapolis	44.980502°N 93.270019°W	Minneapolis Central Library, a four-story glass building with a long metal cantilever on a snowless winter day	2006	Original 1889 building was a few blocks away; replaced 1961 building at current location.	
Minnetonka	Minnetonka	44.908612°N 93.502665°W	The Minnetonka Library, a one-story building with a large, triangular roof, out of which a triangular skylight arises. The building is situated among tall trees, and has a path leading away from its simple entrance. The path is adorned with bushes and a bench.	1989	First opened in the late 1800s in the Fletcher–Loring Flour Mill. Moved to other community locations until settling in 1989 at current location.	
Nokomis	Minneapolis	44.910712°N 93.223059°W	A single-story glass and limestone building from across a street on a sunny summer day	1968	Replaced the Longfellow Community Library, which opened in 1937.	
North Regional	Minneapolis	45.0127809°N 93.2963388°W	North Regional, a tall, one-story glass and concrete library	1971	Was the largest branch outside the main library at the time of its opening in 1971.	
Northeast	Minneapolis	45.010155°N 93.247824°W	Northeast, a brick and glass building with metal siding on its far end and a stepped roof, on a sunny summer day	1973	Replaced 1915 Central Avenue branch	
Osseo	Osseo	45.12072°N 93.402463°W	Sign and entrance for Osseo City Hall and Library in front of a plain, one-story building	1967	First opened above a drugstore in 1922. Moved several times until establishing its current location in Osseo City Hall.	
Oxboro	Bloomington	44.844014°N 93.267279°W	Oxboro, a building with windows inlaid between red brick triangular protrusions, on a sunny summer day	1974	Temporary library operated from 1962 to 1973; current facilities were renovated in 2003–2004, and 2018–2019.	
Penn Lake	Bloomington	44.843989°N 93.309569°W	Penn Lake, a beige brick building of one story, sits before a green lawn with punctuated by several tall trees on a sunny summer day	1970	Replaced library service housed in two different school buildings since 1954	
Pierre Bottineau	Minneapolis	44.999129°N 93.270015°W	Pierre Bottineau Library, a brick building with a metal awning	2003	Started as the Logan Park branch in a small reading room in 1913. Moved and renamed as the Pierre Bottineau Library in 1957. Current location opened in 2003.	
Plymouth	Plymouth	45.022686°N 93.481204°W	Plymouth branch, a brick, glass, and metal building.	2010	Replaced 1995 facility.	
Ridgedale	Minnetonka	44.964785°N 93.440138°W	A modern glassy building with a wavy roof	1982	Renovated in 1999 and 2017–2018	
Rockford Road	Crystal	45.0321032°N 93.3618712°W	Rockford Road branch, a squat, white building located among trees.	1972	Prior to 1972, operated in other locations in the community.	
Rogers	Rogers	45.1915066°N 93.5485597°W	Rogers Library, a small, silver corrugated metal building.	1980	Replaced bookmobile service in the area beginning in the 1970s	
Roosevelt	Minneapolis	44.929614°N 93.232472°W	Roosevelt Library, a small Tudor Revival building surrounded by a neat lawn and black fence	1927	Listed on the National Register of Historic Places	
Southdale	Edina	44.875536°N 93.319706°W	Southdale Library, a modern-style white building in an inverted step sequence supported by pillars over its parking lot on a sunny day	1973	Plans for redevelopment began in 2015, originally with a construction period between 2020 and 2022, but were paused until 2023 due to the COVID-19 pandemic. Planning restarted in 2023, and the library closed for decommissioning on January 6, 2025.	
St. Anthony	St. Anthony	45.016018°N 93.219051°W	The St. Anthony Library, a store-front library with a parking lot directly in front	2002	Replaced 1963 library	
St. Bonifacius	St. Bonifacius	44.9041489°N 93.7434159°W	The small facade of St. Bonifacius, a white building with two columns and green and gold ornamentation, on a sunny winter day.	1931	Renovated in 2006	
St. Louis Park	St. Louis Park	44.9444267°N 93.3697042°W	The facade of the St. Louis Park library, a one-story brick-and-concrete building with flowers lining the entry walkway. There is a bicycle rack off to the right.	1968	Originally opened in 1913; moved in 1914 to Central Junior High School. Moved in 1960 and again to its current location.	
Sumner	Minneapolis	44.984787°N 93.294614°W	Sumner, a Tudor Revival library of red brick on a sunny summer day	1915	In 1938 was relocated 100 feet (30 m) to accommodate construction of Olson Memorial Highway. Listed on the National Register of Historic Places.	
Walker	Minneapolis	44.949596°N 93.298717°W	Walker, a modern library, towers overhead as viewed from the sidewalk beneath its coppery overhang	2014	Replaced 1911 and 1981 Walker branches	
Washburn	Minneapolis	44.907323°N 93.288684°W	A one-story, at-grade building with a corner rotunda	1970	Expanded in 1991; updates were made in 2014	
Wayzata	Wayzata	44.971373°N 93.511663°W	The Wayzata Library, a traditional brick building with square columns and a street lamp.	2003	Replaced earlier 1905, 1955 (temporary), and 1957 library spaces	
Webber Park	Minneapolis	45.031862°N 93.28847°W	A one-story building of gray stone and red wooden beams	2017	Replaced an earlier 1910 library which would become Camden Library and later Webber Park Library which moved to new building in 1980 before moving to a temporary location in 2013.	
Westonka	Mound	44.940627°N 93.666939°W	The Westonka Library, a modern off-white and black building located among foliage. Its welcome sign is in front and off to the left, in a bed of yellow flowers.	1972	Replaced various earlier community locations which began service to the area in 1915	

== Former libraries ==
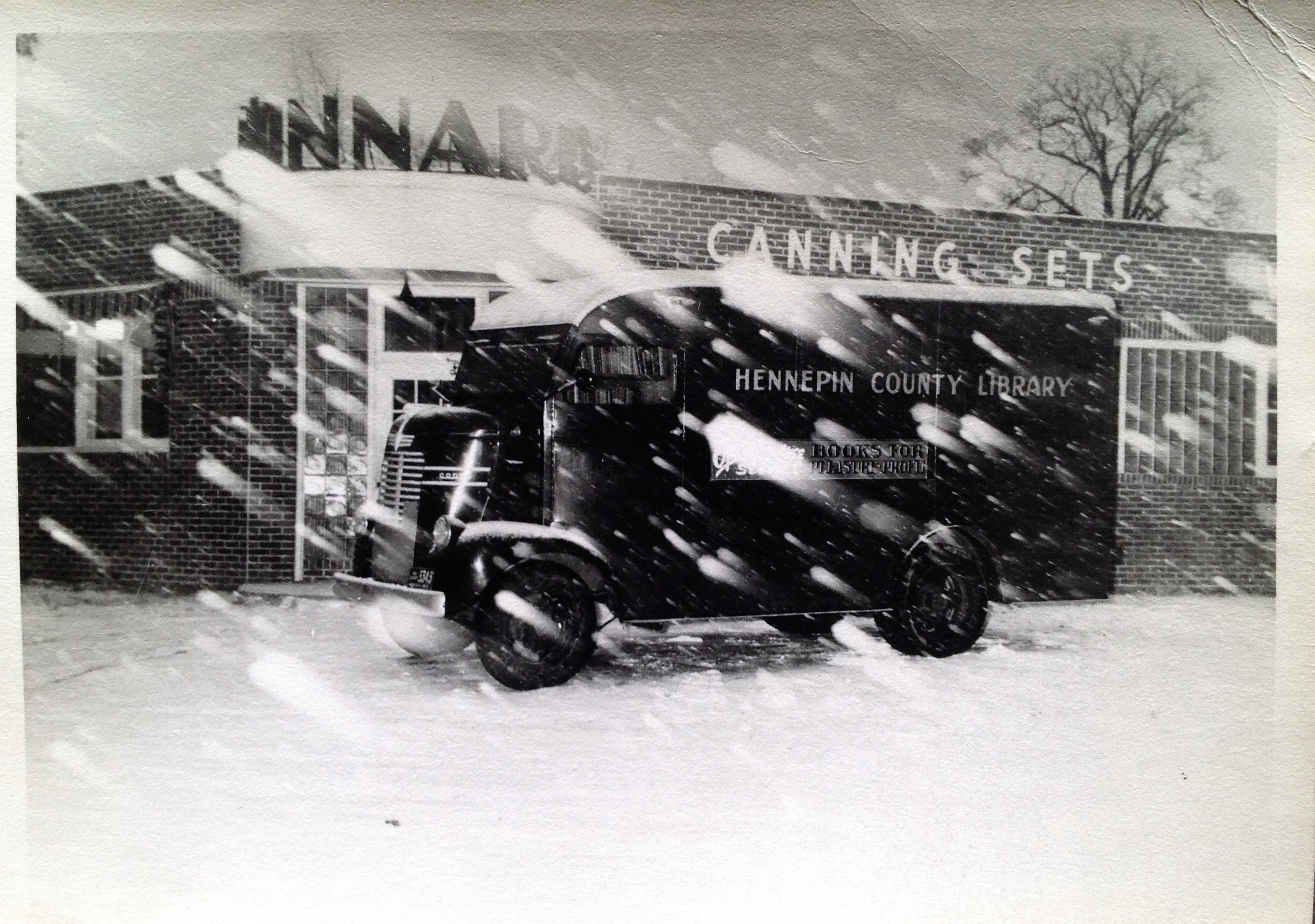
Historic Hennepin County Library bookmobile

Historically, the library operated a bookmobile that started in 1922. In 1955, the bookmobile was serving 1,500–1,600 families and 16 schools, and in 1962 that figure was up to 6,000 families. The library still offers outreach services in the form of mailing or delivering materials to the home of patrons unable to physically access the library system.

The following libraries are no longer operational:

- Crystal Bay (closed in August 1955)
- Dayton (1968–1978)
- Hamel (1922–1968)
- Longfellow (closed in 1968 and replaced by the Nokomis Library)
- Morningside (closed in December 1976)
- North Community Library (the city's first branch library; 1893–1979)
- Seven Corners (1912–1964)
- Stubbs Bay (closed in August 1955)
- Robbinsdale (community now served by the Rockford Road library)

The Hennepin County Library formerly operated school libraries in rural communities and a library in Glen Lake Sanatorium.

== Libraries not part of the Hennepin County Library system ==
Within Hennepin County there are several other libraries that are not part of the Hennepin County Library system. Many of these are connected with colleges and universities, including Lindell Library at Augsburg University, Minneapolis Community and Technical College Library (located in Whitney Hall), Normandale Community College Library, Saint Mary's University of Minnesota Library, North Central University's T.J. Jones Library and the University of Minnesota Libraries. Also in the county are the Minneapolis Institute of Art Museum Library, the Hennepin County Law Library, and the independent Quatrefoil Library which holds collections related to the LGBTQ+ community.

== See also ==
- List of Carnegie libraries in Minnesota
- List of libraries in the United States
