= Edina Library =

Library in Edina, Minnesota, United States

Coordinates: 44°54′29″N 93°21′21″W

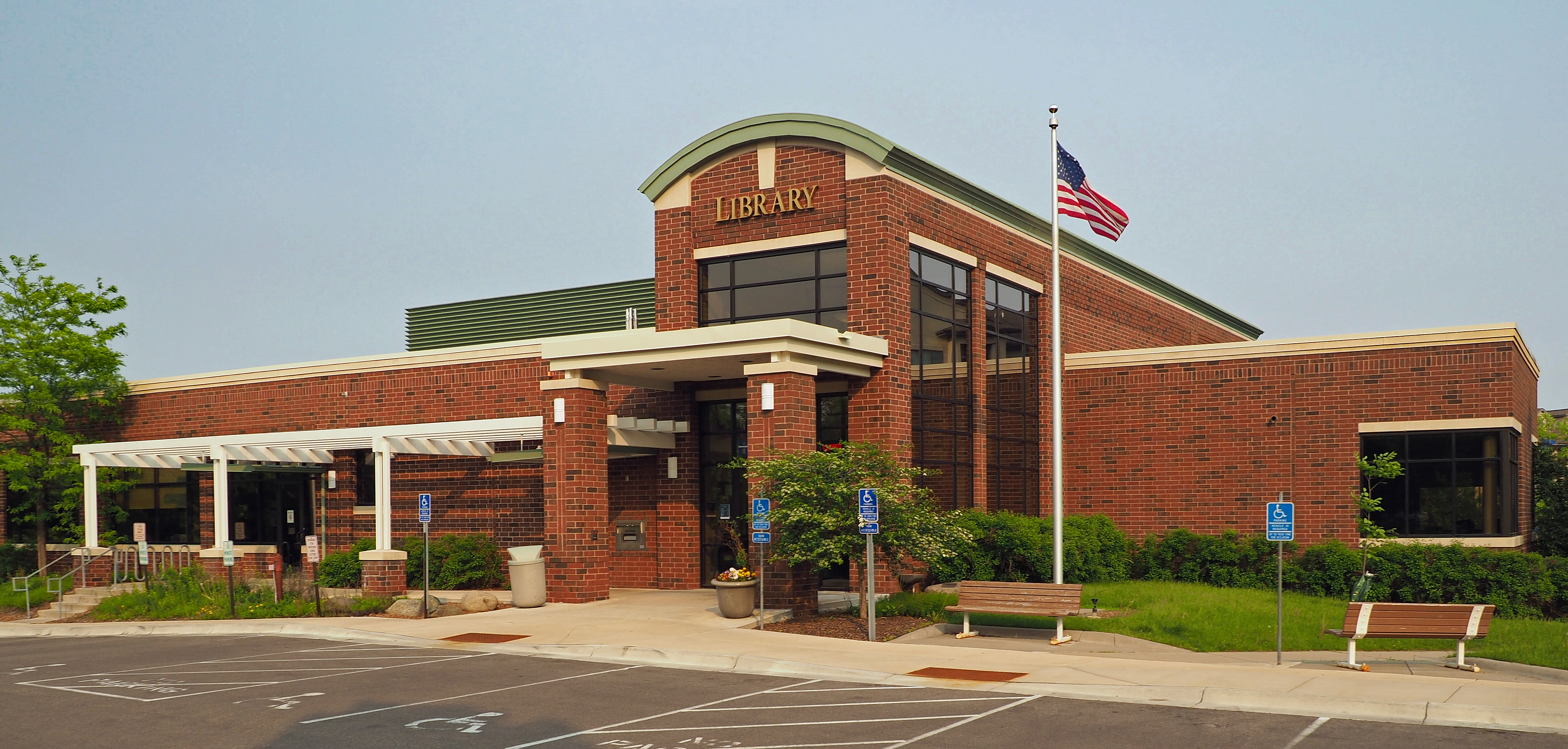
Edina Library viewed from the west

Edina Library is a branch of Hennepin County Library serving Edina, Minnesota, United States.

The library shares facilities with the Edina Senior Center. It has 18,000 square feet (1,700 m^{2}) of floor space, and includes a meeting room, great room with fireplace, and a children's room.

== History ==
The current library facility opened in 2002 The previous library was built in 1967 at 50th and Vernon Avenue at a cost of $439,807. Approximately 25% of construction costs were paid in part by a federal library grant. The Edina library was the first library in Hennepin County to receive federal funds toward library construction costs. From the earliest planning meetings, Edina Library was intended to be joined by a regional library elsewhere in Edina. Southdale Library opened in 1973.

== An early library in Hennepin County ==
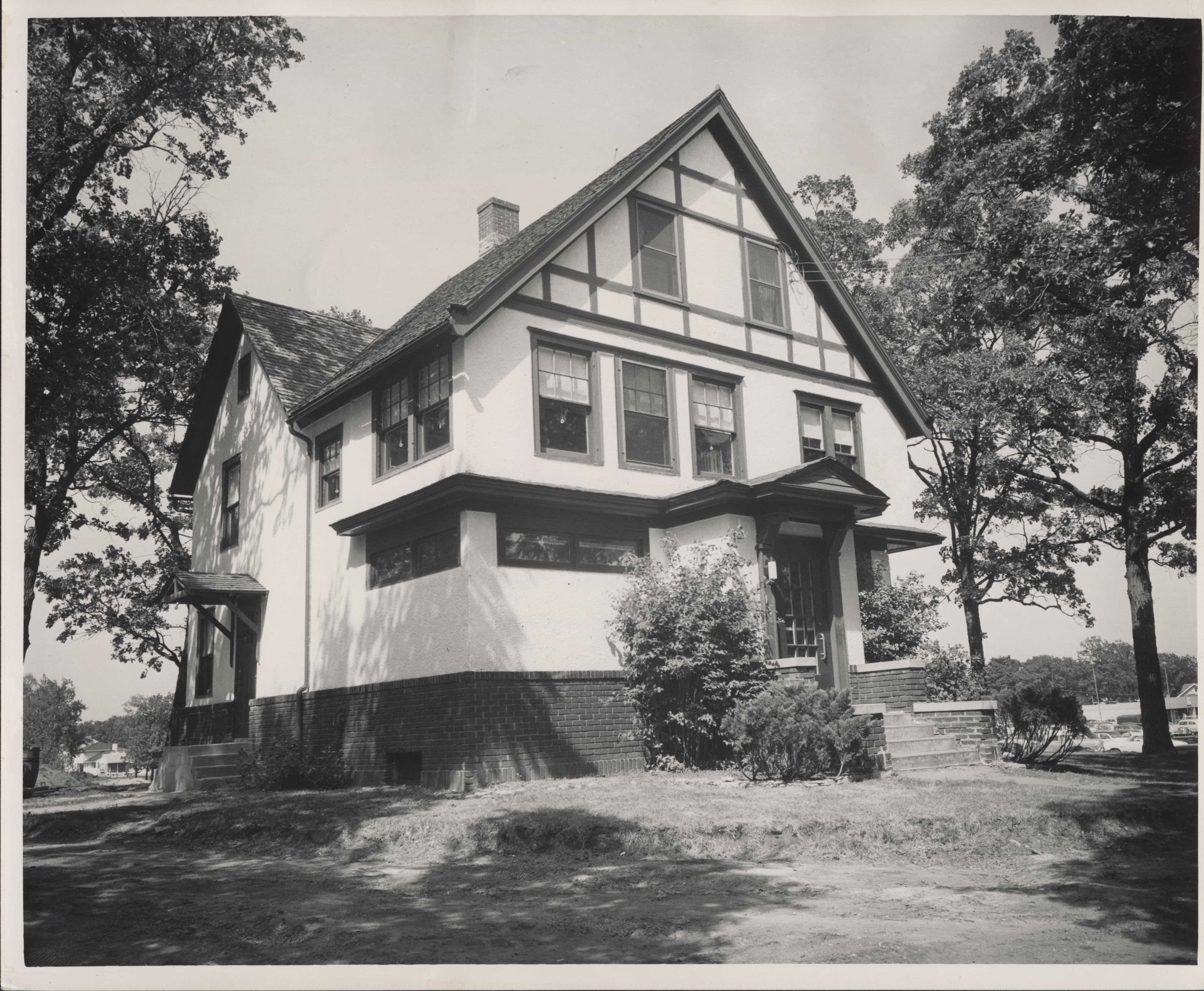
Edina Library at 4120 West 50th Street, 1954-1968.

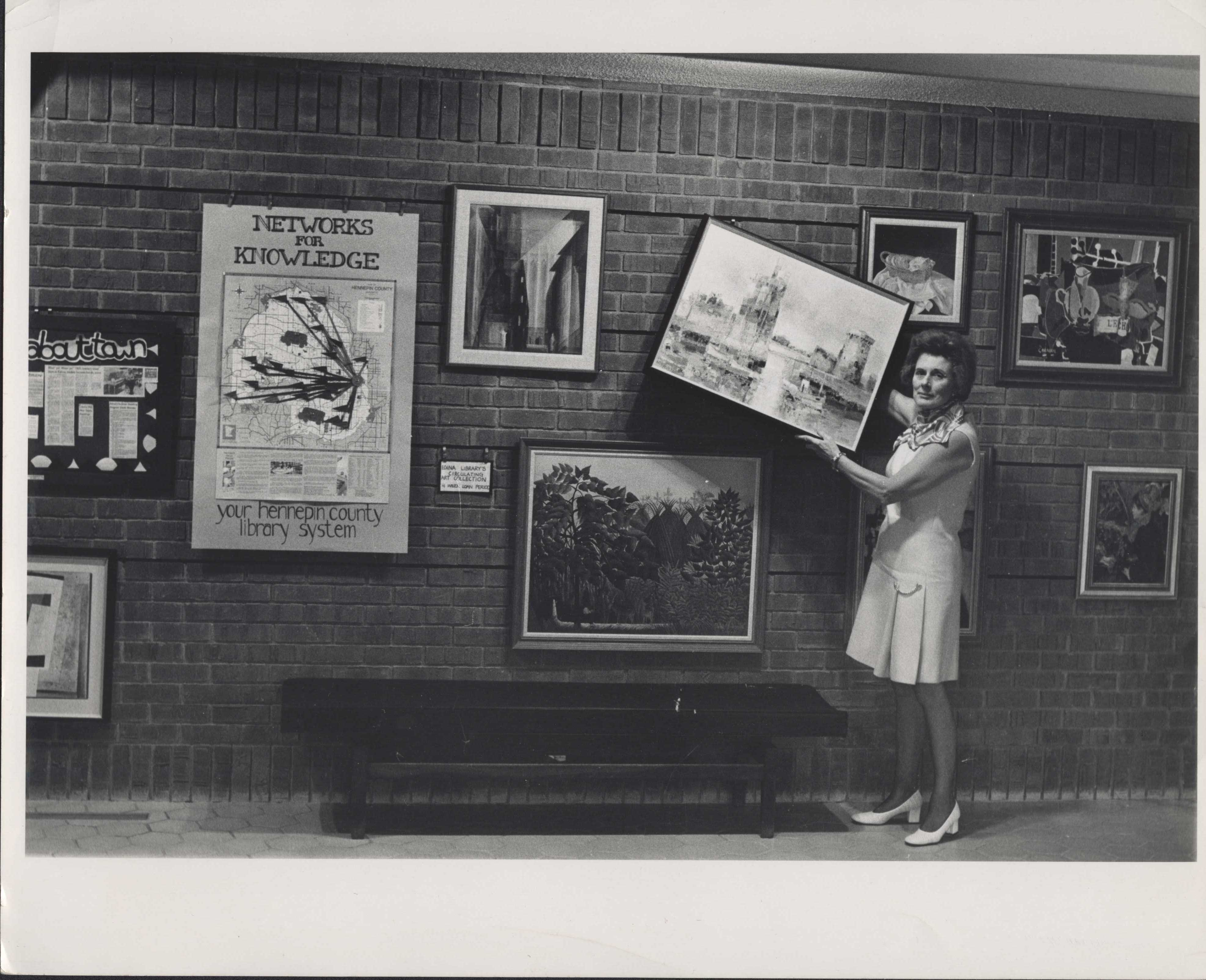
Dorothy Dunn, Librarian, shows off Edina Library's art lending collection, 1970s.

Edina's library roots go back to September 1921, and predate Hennepin County Library system. Four months before Hennepin County Library began its county-wide library services, Edina opened its first library in a school in the Linden Hills neighborhood. In 1926, the library relocated to 50th and Wooddale, and in 1939, moved to the Westgate Theater building in the Morningside neighborhood. This move allowed Edina to have its first free-standing public library, and it became known as the Edina Morningside Branch library. The Morningside library was closed by the Hennepin County Board, effective December 31, 1976.

In 1954, a second Edina Branch Library opened at 4120 West 50th Street. The former residence of James Bull, it was given to the City by Russell Lund and George Kruse. With room for between 6,000 and 7,000 books, space was limited to children's and young adult books, and general fiction and non-fiction. The space was considered quite small by the standards of the American Library Association.

As a result, the League of Women Voters began campaigning in 1962 for a larger library for Edina. In 1967, following considerable preparation, plans were announced to build on 50th Street and Eden Avenue. The building, known as the Edina Community Library, opened in September 1968 at 4701 West 50th Street next to the Village Hall.

Construction costs totaled $410,000, with 15,500 square feet of floor space. The space was designed by Arthur Dickey, an Edina resident, and included a reading room for adults, a children's room, a drive-up service window, and a multi-purpose room. Art reproductions, displayed near the entry vestibule, were available for checkout by patrons. Edina was the first branch library in the Hennepin County Library system to loan art prints. When the current library opened in April 2002, Edina razed the old library to make way for a new city hall and policy department.

== Amenities of the Edina Library ==
A Chrysalis Room anchors a dedicated space for children's and teen events program. Patrons can also use the room for help with homework, story time, or learning English as a second language. The library has a special collection of Chinese and French materials, along with Spanish resources for children. Programming ranges from Girls Only and Guys Read Book Clubs to author events, and Baby and Family Storytimes.

== A City of Innovation ==
The Edina Art and Book Festival, which began in 1966, was established to generate revenue for building a new library for Edina. Also of note, Edina librarian Dorothy Dunn, who began her tenure as a librarian in Edina at the Morningside Library in 1963, created the Friends of the Edina Library program, which is widely regarded as a prototype for similar library support programs across the country.

== Art in the library ==
A variety of media are on display within and outside the Edina Library. Janey Westin, a Minneapolis-based calligrapher and sculptor, has permanently loaned her work, “Laura Reading,” a marble and limestone sculpture to the library. Edina resident Doug Lew's “Mother Daughter Book Club” was dedicated in 2006 to the memory of Christie Blackwood.” “Who Has Seen the Wind,” a stained glass commission funded by One Percent for Art, is William Saltzman's multi-panel celebration of nature. University of Minnesota art professor Katherine Nash's eleven-foot high commission in copper, “Heritage of Edina” exterior sculpture contrasts with Tom Montemurro's miniature sculpture, titled “Children on Parade” in the children's area.
