= Hennepin County Library =

Public library in Minnesota

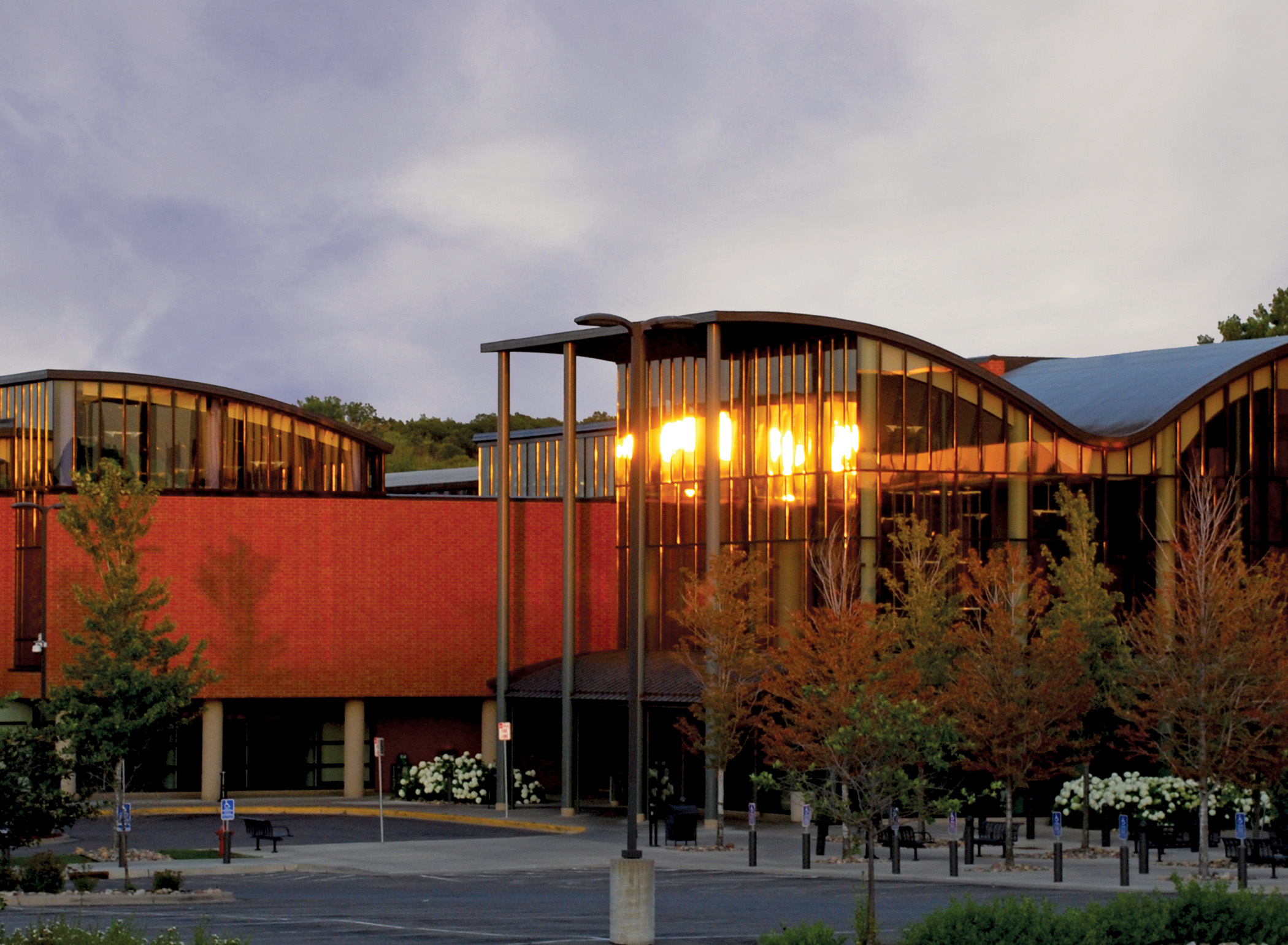
- Ridgedale Library, the location of the Hennepin County Library headquarters
- 44.9647°N 93.4402°W
- Location: 12601 Ridgedale Dr., Minnetonka, Minnesota, U.S. 55305
- Established: January 1, 2008; 18 years ago
- Branches: 41 (list)

Other information
- Website: www.hclib.org

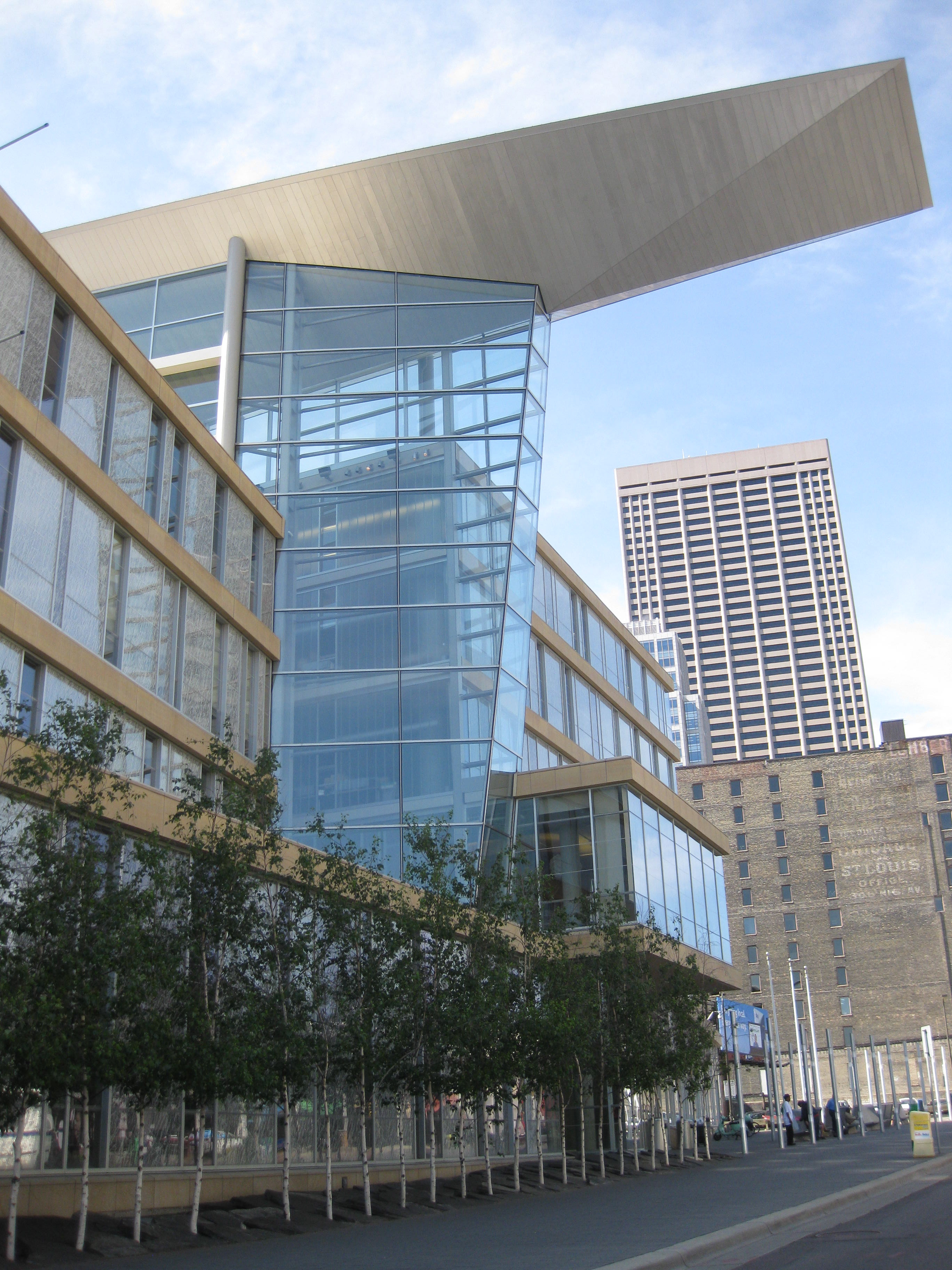
The Minneapolis Central Library in downtown Minneapolis, designed by César Pelli, completed in 2006

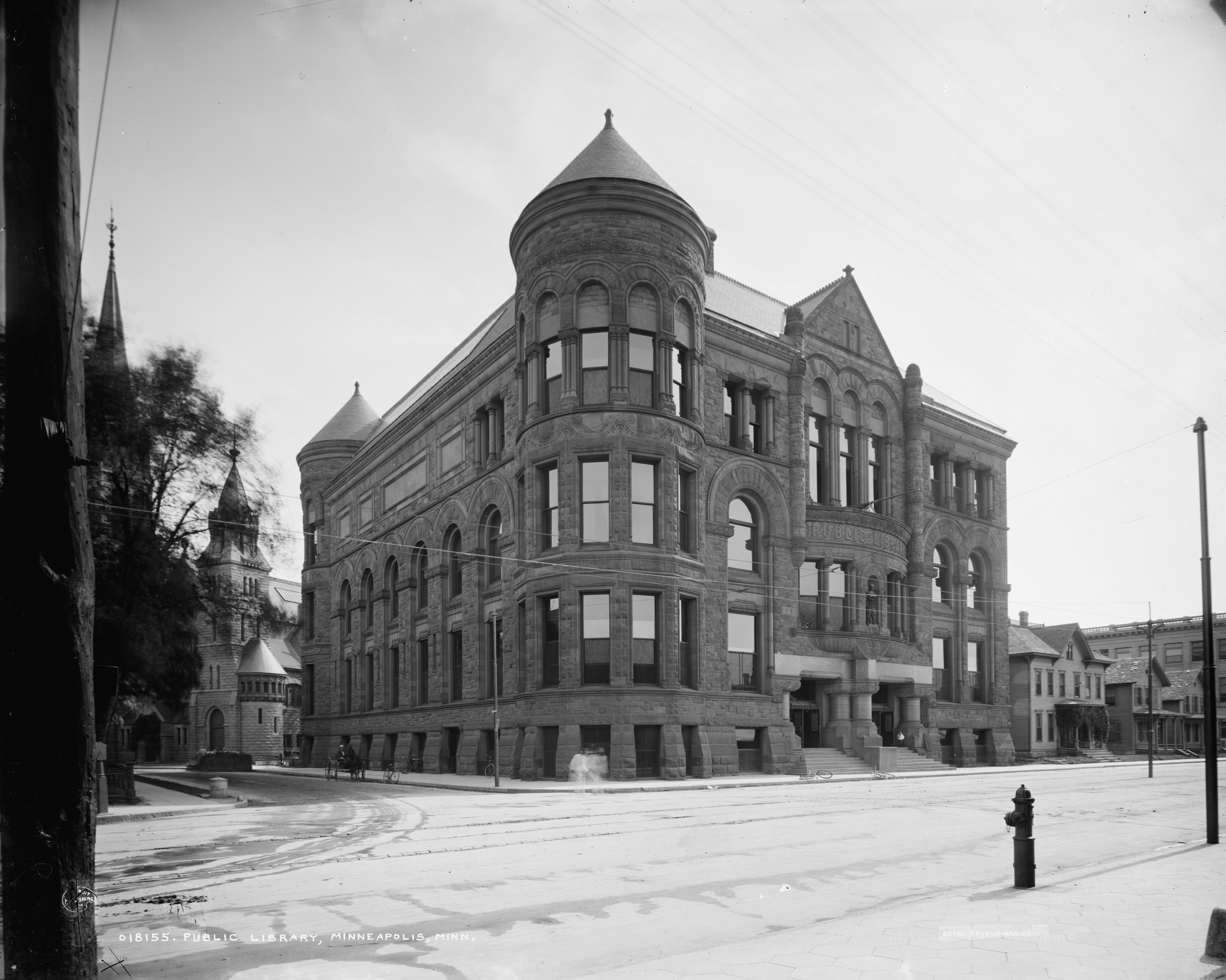
The first central Minneapolis Public Library, early 1900s

2011 Hennepin County Library card

Hennepin County Library is a public library system serving Hennepin County, Minnesota, United States. The current iteration of Hennepin County Library was formed by the merger of urban Minneapolis Public Library and suburban Hennepin County Library on January 1, 2008. Its headquarters is in Minnetonka, Minnesota, at the Ridgedale Library. The system has 41 library locations, deposit collections at nursing homes and correctional facilities, mail service to the homebound, and extensive outreach services. With more than 4 million items in its collection, the Hennepin County Library system is one of the largest public libraries in the United States. The library is a department of Hennepin County Government. The library headquarters are in the Ridgedale Library in suburban Minnetonka. The library system has an eleven-member advisory Library Board appointed by the Hennepin County Board of Commissioners. It is a member of the Metropolitan Library Service Agency, a consortium of eight Twin Cities library systems.

== History ==
Minneapolis Public Library was founded in 1885 with the establishment of the Minneapolis Public Library Board by an amendment of the Minneapolis city charter. Minneapolis Public Library's first building was the Main Library, opened in 1889. Minneapolis Public Library later added community library branches to supplement the main library. The first branch was North Branch, established in 1890, more branches in south and east Minneapolis followed, and the system grew with the city.

Hennepin County Library started in 1922 as a horse-drawn "bookmobile" to areas outside the core city of Minneapolis. The system saw a large increase in use in the period between 1950 and 1980 as more people moved into suburban areas of the county. By 1952 there were 24 libraries in the system; additional city libraries, such as Hopkins, were incorporated into the county system. Hennepin County Library opened its first area library, Southdale, in 1973. In the early 1970s plans were in place to merge the Minneapolis Public Library with the Hennepin County Library. However, the Minneapolis library system reconsidered, and merger plans were put on hold. Ultimately, the two library systems reached an agreement, and the merger was finalized on January 1, 2008, under the name of Hennepin County Library.

== Branches ==
=== Minneapolis ===
- Arvonne Fraser Library
- East Lake Library
- Franklin Library
- Hosmer Library
- Linden Hills Library
- Minneapolis Central Library
- Nokomis Library
- North Regional Library
- Northeast Library
- Pierre Bottineau Library
- Roosevelt Library
- Sumner Library
- Walker Library
- Washburn Library
- Webber Park Library

=== Suburban Hennepin County ===
- Augsburg Park Library (Richfield)
- Brookdale Library (Brooklyn Center)
- Brooklyn Park Library
- Champlin Library
- Eden Prairie Library
- Edina Library
- Excelsior Library
- Golden Valley Library
- Hopkins Library
- Long Lake Library
- Maple Grove Library
- Maple Plain Library
- Minnetonka Library
- Osseo Library
- Oxboro Library (Bloomington)
- Penn Lake Library (Bloomington)
- Plymouth Library
- Ridgedale Library (Minnetonka)
- Rockford Road Library (Crystal)
- Rogers Library
- Southdale Library (Edina)
- St. Anthony Library
- St. Bonifacius Library
- St. Louis Park Library
- Wayzata Library
- Westonka Library (Mound)

== City locations ==
- Bloomington (2)
- Brooklyn Center
- Brooklyn Park
- Champlin
- Crystal
- Eden Prairie
- Edina (2)
- Excelsior
- Golden Valley
- Hopkins
- Long Lake
- Maple Grove
- Maple Plain
- Minneapolis (15)
- Minnetonka (2)
- Mound
- Osseo
- Plymouth
- Richfield
- Rogers
- St. Anthony
- St. Bonifacius
- St. Louis Park
- Wayzata

== Bookmobile ==
The Hennepin County Free Library started operating a bookmobile (then called a book wagon) in 1922.

== Library directors ==
- Pauline Field, 1922–1925
- Ethel Berry, 1925–1947
- Helen Young, 1947–1969
- Robert H. Rohlf, 1969–1994
- Charles M. Brown, 1994–2004
- Amy Ryan, 2005–2008
- Lois Langer Thompson, 2009–2018
- Janet Mills (interim), 2018–2020
- Chad Helton, August 24, 2020 – February 25, 2022
- Dan Rogan (Interim), February 25, 2022 – October 9, 2023
- Scott Duimstra, October 9, 2023 – present
