= North Regional Library =

Coordinates: 45°0′46″N 93°17′47″W

North Regional Library is a public library in Minneapolis, Minnesota, United States. It is part of the Hennepin County Library system. Since opening in 1971, North Regional Library at 1315 Lowry Ave. N. in Minneapolis serves a diverse metropolitan community, Near North, Minneapolis.

== Previous Northside Libraries, 1893–1977 ==
The first stand alone library branch built by Minneapolis Public Library was Minneapolis Public Library, North Branch. It served the community from 1893-1977. Along with Minneapolis Public Library, North Branch, other neighborhood libraries housed in schools such as Jordan, were closed after North Regional Library opened.

== North Regional Library's beginnings ==
First proposed as an addition to the City of Minneapolis Library system in 1964, the Library Board decided it was time to build a library in North Minneapolis, which at that time included some of the poorest households in the city. After selecting the block on Lowry Avenue between Fremont and Girard Avenues, Minneapolis architectural firm Miller Dunwiddie was engaged to draw up the plans. In anticipation of the grand opening on October 24, 1971, 25,000 leaflets were sent out to the residents in the neighborhood, inviting them to visit their new library. Minneapolis Public Library director Ervin J. Gaines envisioned a citywide system of regional libraries like North Regional, a south regional library was planned but no others were built.

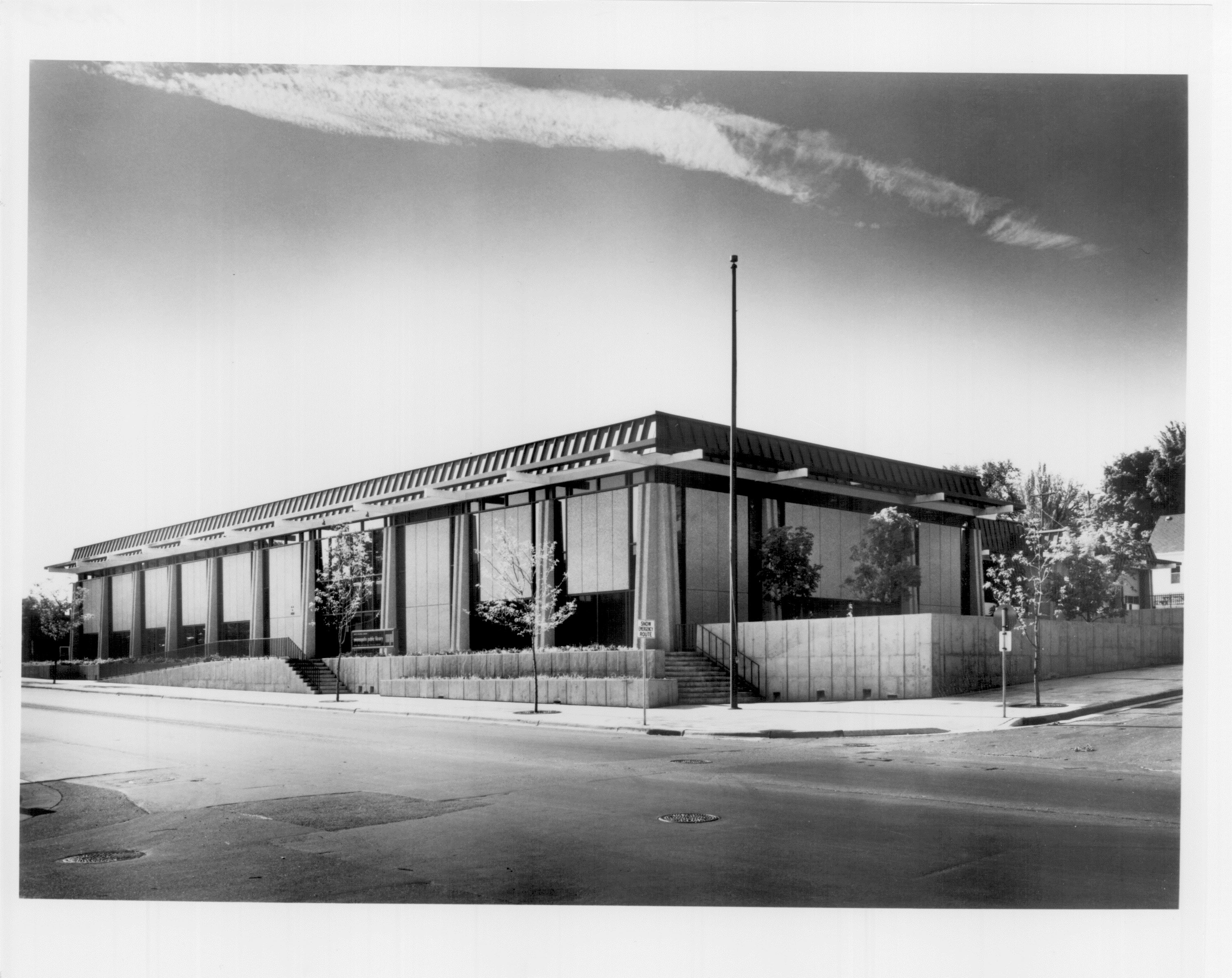
North Regional Library exterior, 1971

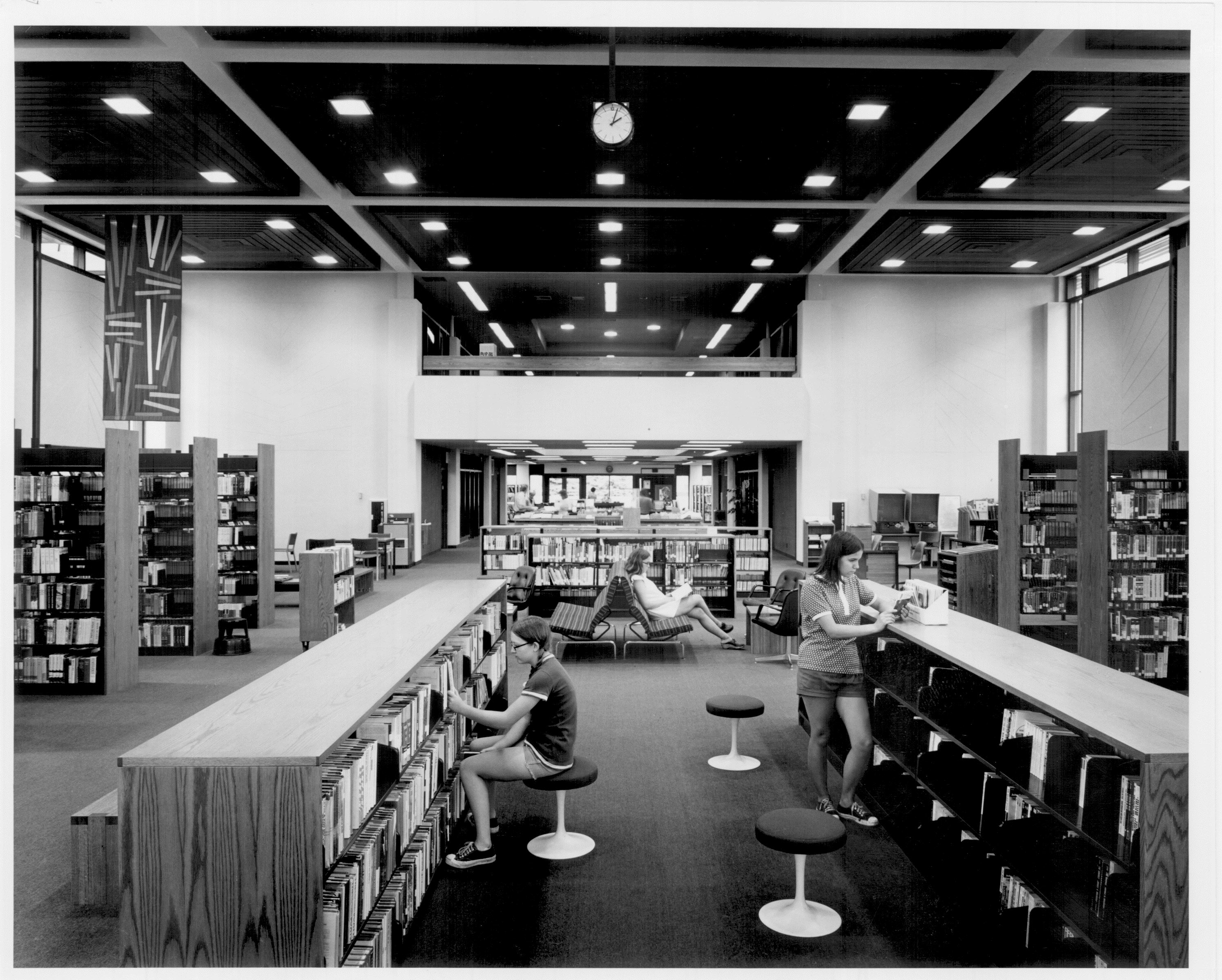
Interior of library shortly after opening.

North Regional Library also featured the Emerson Room. The Emerson Room housed the New England literature collection of 500 books donated by J. Harold Kittleson. It was decorated like the interior of a New England home of the 19th century. These include first editions by authors including Emily Dickinson, Ralph Waldo Emerson, Henry Wadsworth Longfellow, Robert Lowell, Henry David Thoreau, and John Greenleaf Whittier. The 19th Century Collection is now at Minneapolis Central, Special Collections.

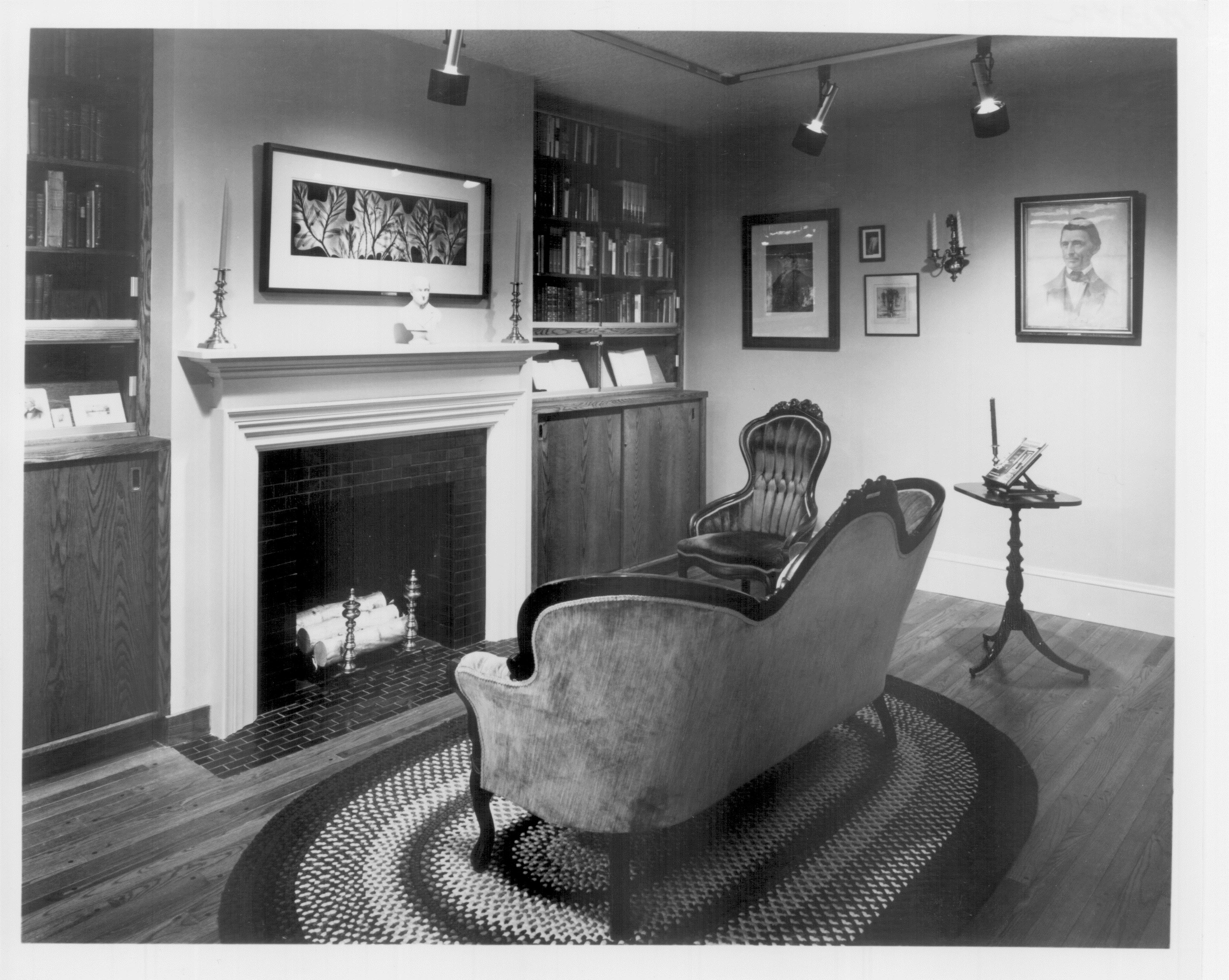
Emerson Room, North Regional Library

== Remodeling North Regional in 2007 ==
By size, it was the second largest public library in the city, and it served the community for over 35 years in its original form. With a pressing need to make the building fully accessible and more welcoming, update technology access and make it more economical to manage, the city put out bids for much-needed updates. Considerable thought went into assessing and understanding patrons needs: for over a year, the library leaders met with the neighborhood’s advisory committee to agree on what the new space should look like and how it should function. Considerations included the height of the shelving and the interior lighting.

Renovations of the 32,600 square foot space were designed by KKE Architects and totaled $4,567,083, with $2.583 million sourced from voter referendum funding, $1.6 million from the City of Minneapolis’ Capital Improvement Program. Additional dollars were provided by the State of Minnesota Department of Education (for an accessibility grant) and from the surrounding Cleveland, Jordan and McKinley neighborhoods, which contributed $32,500. The remodeled space focuses on the importance of nature and discovery and reopened following a renovation on January 27, 2007. In support of early literacy programs, children are welcomed into their reading area by a big blue throne, and have a designated space in which they can play indoors after checking out their books, or participating in a story time program.

== Renovation in 2020 ==
The library closed for renovation on March 16, 2020. It reopened in 2021. The $9 million project added four small study rooms upstairs and a large meeting room. A new enclosed room on the main floor was designed for focused computer work. And added emphasis on early literacy play enhanced the children’s area, lounge seating was added to the teen area.

The renovation included traffic control and pedestrian improvements. An outdoor reading area with seating and a children’s garden were also added.

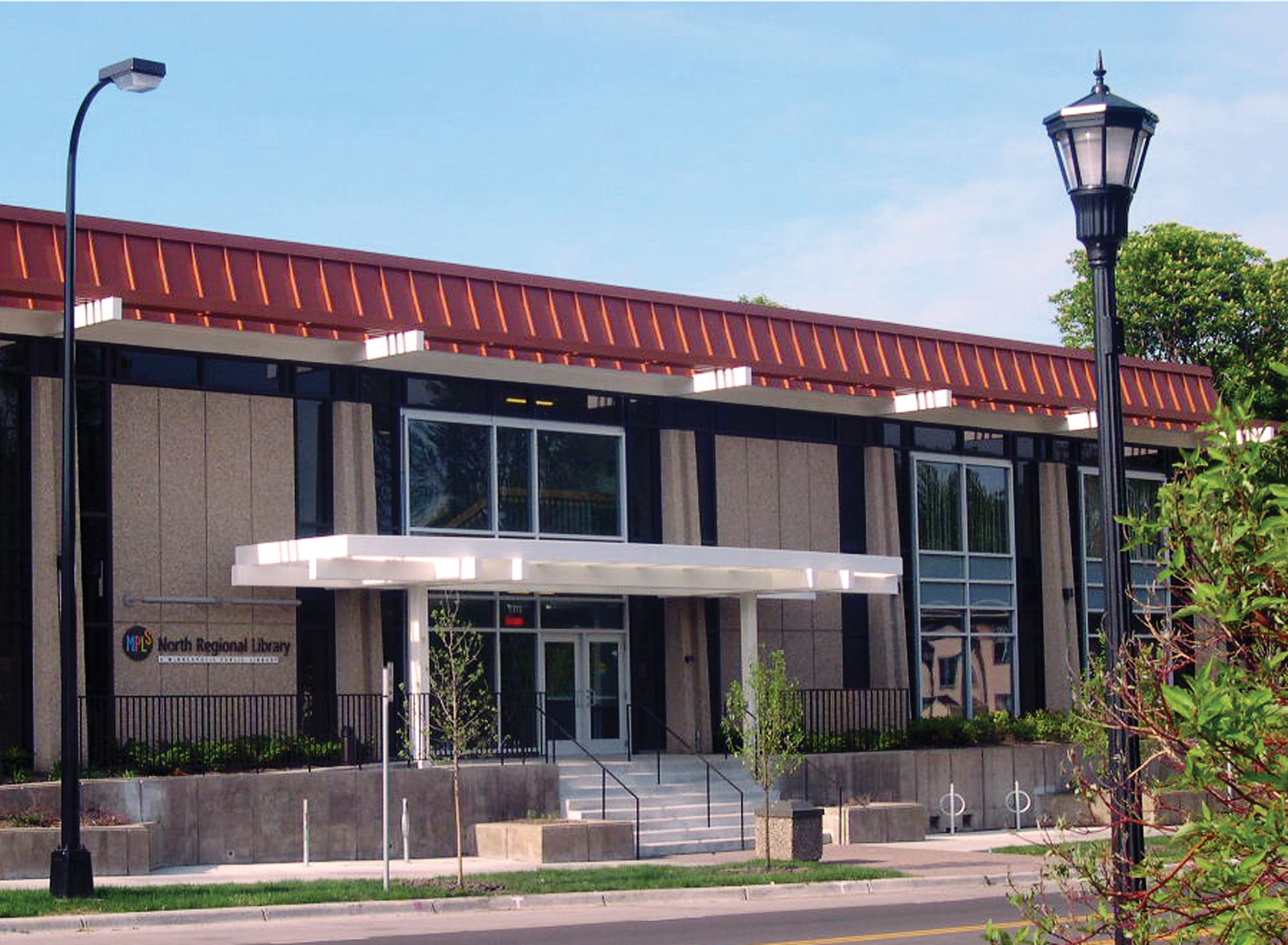
North Regional Library exterior, 2007

== Programs at North Regional ==
The needs of job seekers and those wanting to build or improve their computer literacy skills are supported with state-of-the-art technology, including over 40 computers, wireless access, and a classroom. For teens, Homework Helper tutors are available after school, and the Discovery Room gives younger patrons a designated space for creative play. Children and teens are the largest users of the library, and the staff at North Regional create their programs with the patrons’ needs top of mind. Hmong-speaking staffers are available at the library three days a week, supporting users’ information needs, and teaching patrons how to navigate the library’s resources. HIRED and CPED are resident in the library regularly, helping job seekers.

== Amenities of the building ==
Public meeting rooms are located upstairs, including the Emerson Room. The space was remodeled so that the children’s and teen’s side of the building is aligned on the east side of the building, and has low shelving and much open space, to let children’s minders keep an eye on them. A photography installation by Wing Young Huie encourages children to look at their neighbors.

== Art at the library ==
Artwork in the North Regional Library reflects nature and discovery, and includes: a commission from Wing Young Huie, a Twin Cities photographer, showcasing residents of North Minneapolis; Marjorie Pitz, a Minneapolis-based wood sculptor; and a mobile composed of 1,000 cranes made by residents of North Minneapolis in the summer of 2008. Pitz’s sculptures are meant to be sat on, slid down, and leaned against. The leaves are seven feet long, and carved from walnut, cherry, and maple.
