= Champlin Library =

Library in Champlin, Minnesota, US

Coordinates: 45°10′29″N 93°23′39″W

Champlin Library, at 12154 Ensign Avenue North in Champlin, Minnesota, has served patrons at that address since September 1994. Designed by TSP Architects and Engineers, at a cost of $1.2 million, the library includes 8,905 square feet.

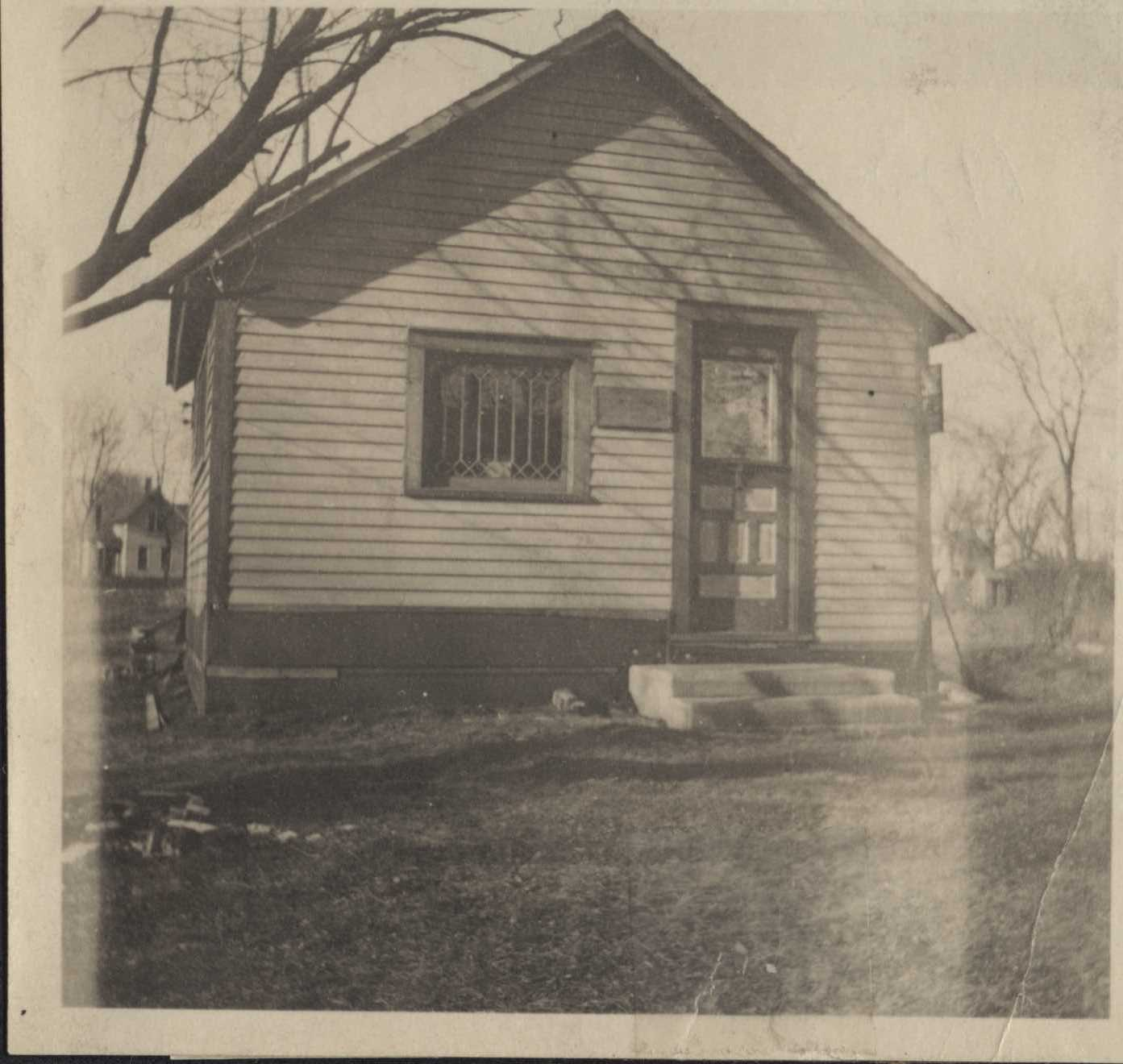
Champlin Library, 1922

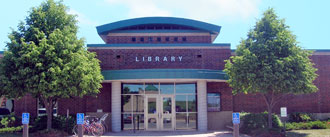
Champlin Library

The first public library in Champlin, sponsored by the Champlin Women's Club, opened in 1913 in a small rented room and was open only on Saturday afternoons and evenings. In 1921, the Women's Club purchased a small cottage and converted it into a library, and in 1922 Champlin joined the Hennepin County Library system. A subsequent move to a building on Dayton Road and Oak Street (now Curtis Road) was followed by a temporary relocation in 1972 to Mississippi Point Park at Highway 169 and West River Road while a new library was constructed at the site of Dayton Road and Curtis Roads in 1973. The new facility, known as the Champlin Reading Center, measured 1,600 square feet when it opened in and held about 8,000 books in addition to reference materials, music, films and periodicals. An addition to the building in 1981 provided 600 more square feet to the library. During construction, library service was provided by bookmobile parked out front of the library. The 87% growth of Champlin's population from 1980 to 1990, and the need to realign Highway 169 shaped the decision to move to the Ensign Avenue location.

Friends of the Champlin Library formed in May 1979, and have raised money for the library with semi-annual book sales.

== Art in the library ==
Mellissa Sibley, librarian at Champlin from 1986 to 1996, convened a citizens’ art committee to select additions for the new library. The first installation was “The Seasons” by Dawn Purtle, a stained glass work placed over the entryway. Ruth Stephens, a retired librarian at Champlin, funded part of the purchase of the work.

Christopher Tully, a Minnesota artist, has two commissions in Champlin Library. Suspended from the atrium is his “Herons in the Library,” a trio of vibrant-hued birds flying through the air toward the children's area. Joining the herons on a nearby wall is Tully's “Mississippi Flight,” a three-dimensional wall mural, depicting Minnesota's wildlife and the Mississippi River. The river is prominent in Champlin's geography as it marks the eastern and northern boundaries of the city.

“Teen Wall Collage” by Christopher Bailey Foote, was installed on September 11, 2004, marking the 10th anniversary of the current library. The collage features scenes from Champlin's history and peers into the future.
