= Brooklyn Park Library =

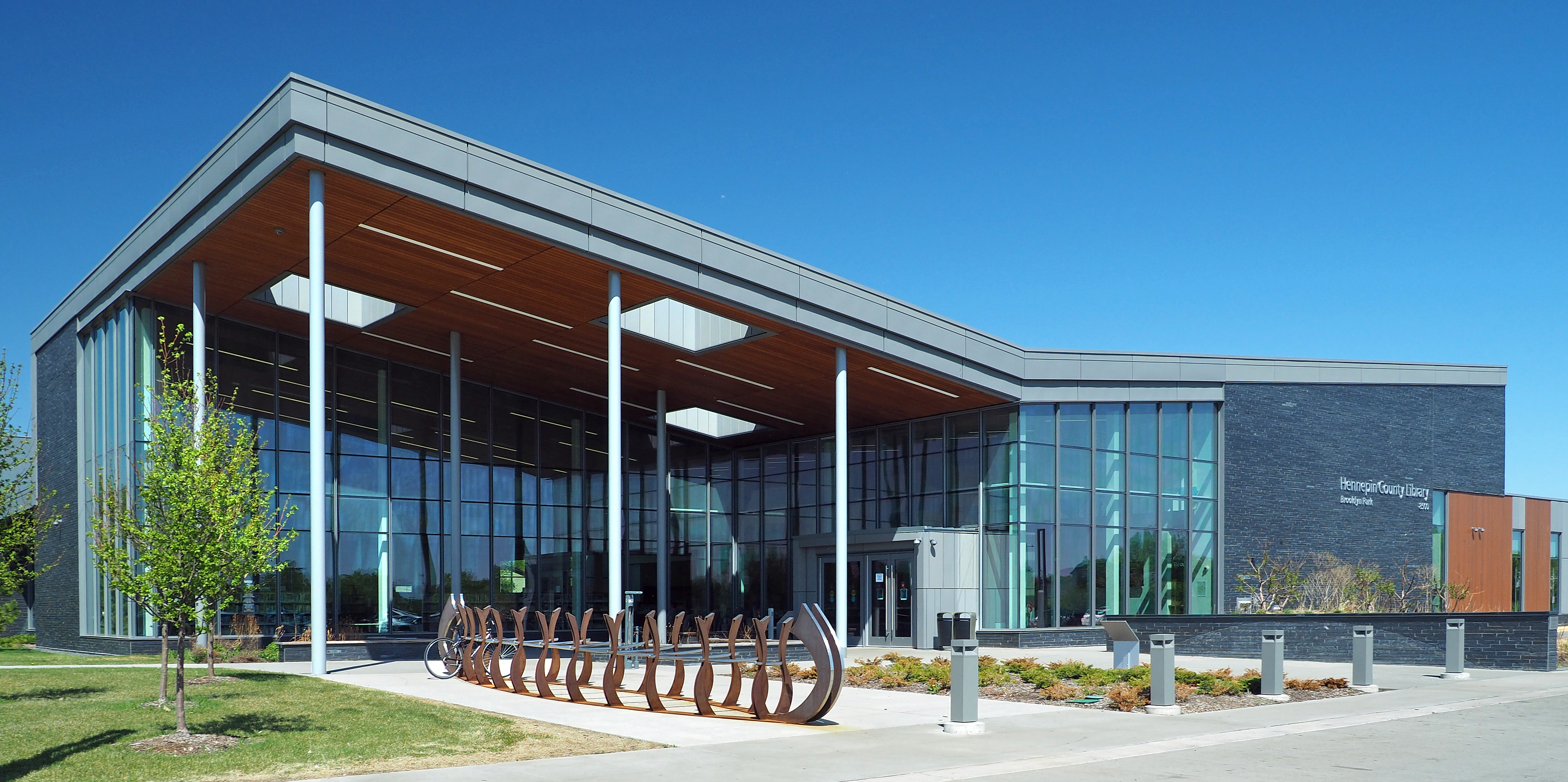
- Interactive map of the Brooklyn Park Library area

General information
- Location: 8500 W. Broadway Avenue, Brooklyn Park, Minnesota
- Coordinates: 45°6′37″N 93°22′34″W
- Opened: 2016

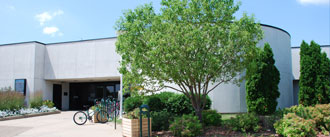
The original Brooklyn Park Library, built 1976

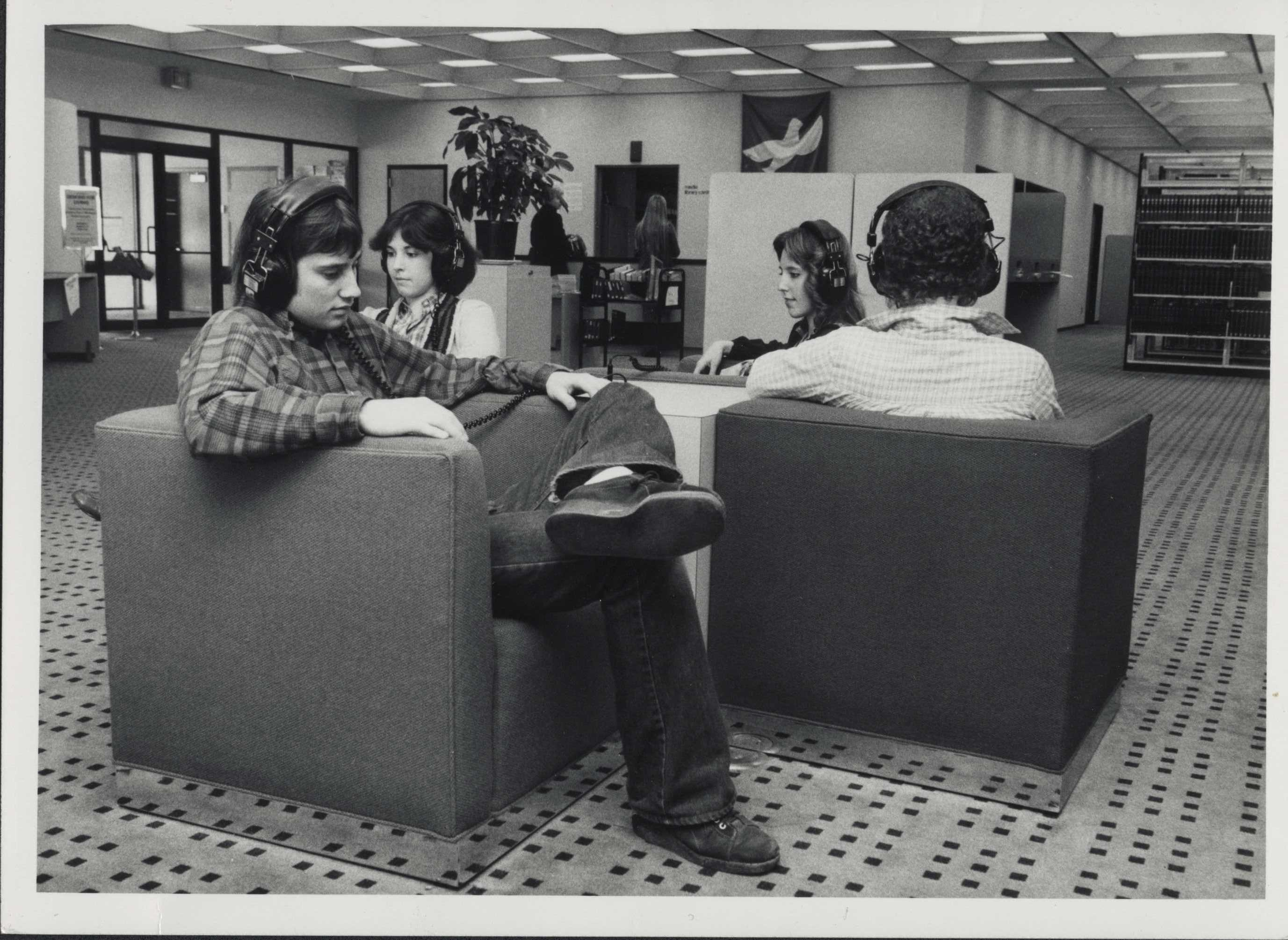
Brooklyn Park Library interior, 1976

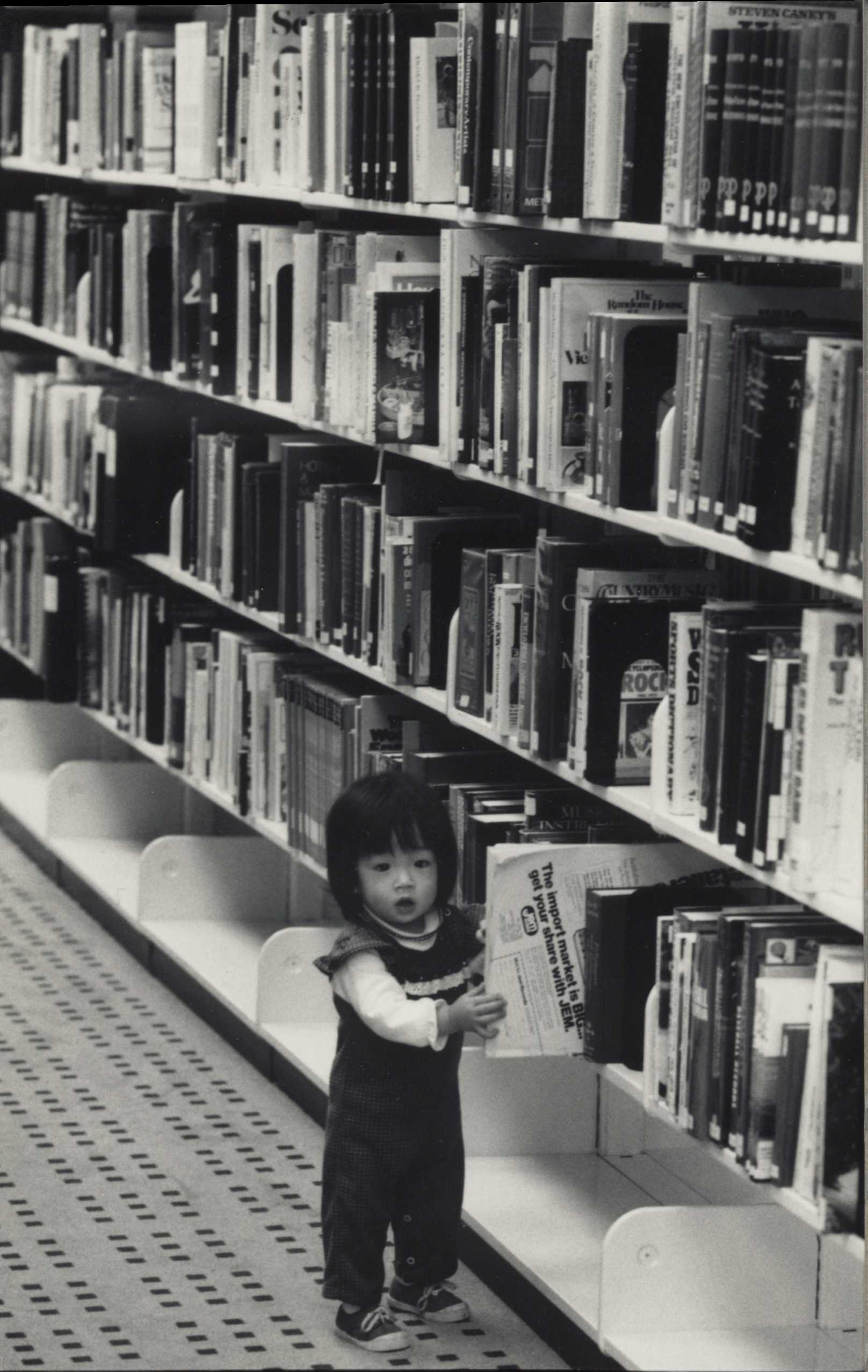
Brooklyn Park Library interior, 1976

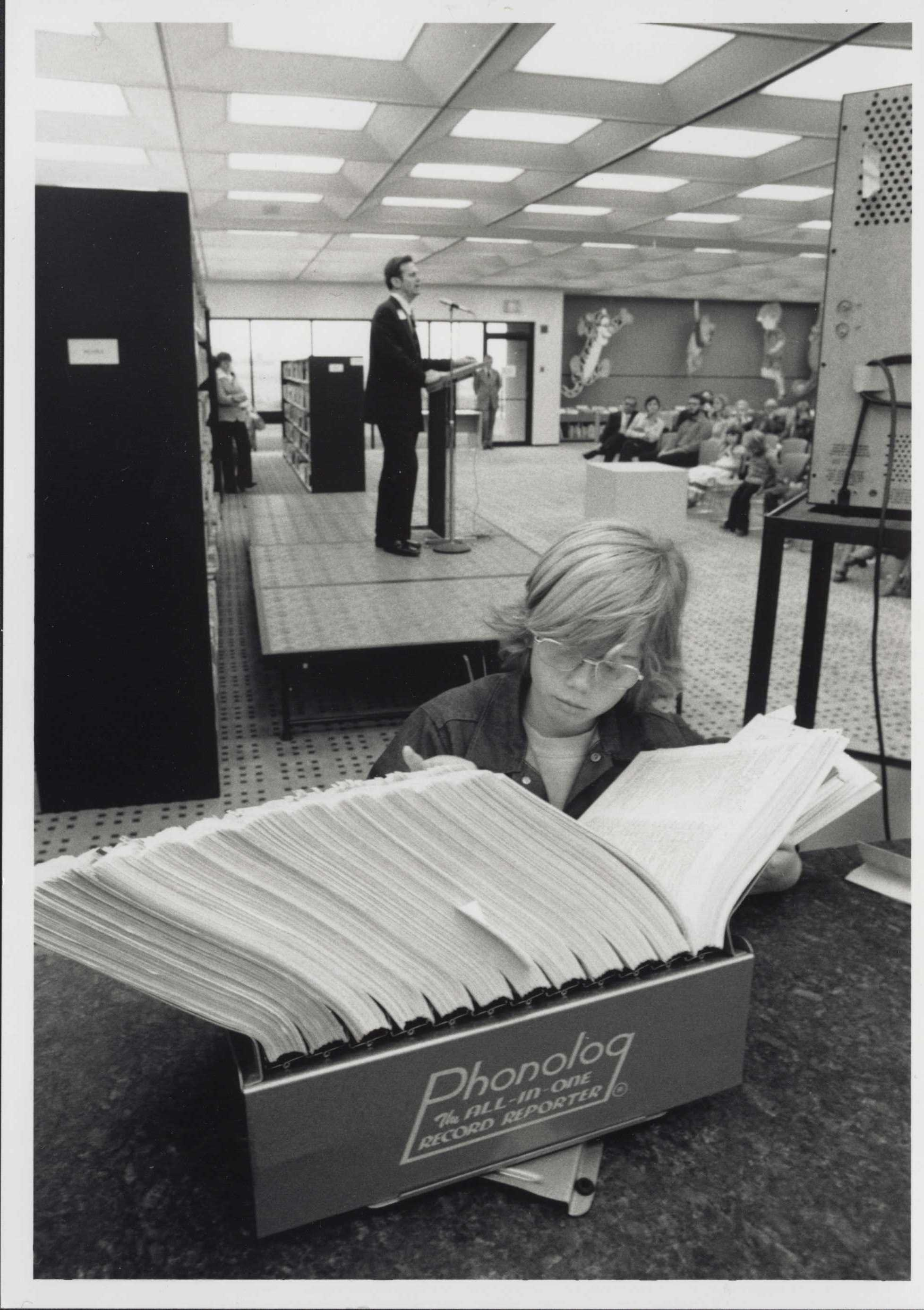
Brooklyn Park Library interior, 1976

Brooklyn Park Library is a branch of Hennepin County Library serving Brooklyn Park, Minnesota, United States. The current facility opened in June 2016, replacing an earlier library building at 8600 Zane Avenue North that opened in 1976. Prior to that the area was served by Hennepin County Library's bookmobile.

== History ==
The previous Brooklyn Park Library was designed by Setter, Leach and Lindstrom. Built at a cost of $814,651, the library was 15,100 square feet (1,400 m^{2}) and was renovated in 1999.

In November 2013, Hennepin County Board approved construction plans for a new library in Brooklyn Park at the northeast intersection of 85th Avenue and West Broadway. The new building, set to open in 2016, will more than double the size of the current space to better meet the growing community's needs. Feedback from the public regarding their vision of the new library was received through a survey and a series of community meetings. Costs are budgeted at $23.5 million. Designed by Hammel Green and Abrahamson Architects & Engineers, and measuring 39,000 square feet, the new building will include a children's interactive zone, a tech studio and several reading lounges. The children's area has been designed in collaboration with Minnesota Children's Museum and will invite families to linger and enjoy reading, learning and playing at the library. Patrons will be able to experience the library as living room for the community: it will include an open floor plan to facilitate interactions among patrons. The new library incorporates the State of Minnesota's Sustainable Building Guidelines.

== Community ==
A reflection of the growing population and cultural plurality of Brooklyn Park and adjacent cities, three themes will anchor the new library: STEAM (science, technology, engineering, arts and math); world culture; and geography. A look at the primary home language for residents in Brooklyn Park reflects the growth and change in the city: 24% speak a language other than English. A total of 42 different languages are spoken in 11 elementary schools in the city, including Spanish, Hmong, Vietnamese, Creolized English, Lao and a combination of other Liberian languages. Currently, the library's holdings include materials in Hmong, Spanish and Vietnamese.

== Art at the library ==
Bruce E. Nygren, a Minneapolis-based painter, created a mural in children's area at the Zane Avenue location. It depicted a reflecting pool made up of familiar objects in playful juxtaposition. Included were an elephant standing atop a stack of books, a penguin riding a car, pears larger than trucks, and a monkey sitting in the middle. Installed in 2004, it was 25 feet (7.6 m) long and invited patrons reflect on Nygren's use of the horizon line.

The Hennepin County Library system commissioned two public art pieces for the Brooklyn Park Library's new building. One project was a bike rack sculpture created by Greg Mueller of Mueller Studio. The other piece was a lenticular mural titled Sectio Aurea, which was designed by Norman Lee and Shane Allbritton of RE:site Studio, printed by PolyVision, and installed by Metalab.

== Programming at the library ==
Homework tutors are available several days a week in the afternoons. A meeting room is also available for patrons' use. Family and Baby Storytimes, Teen Tech Workshops, Adult Homework Help, Learn Together events for K-3 students, and Senior Surf Day are examples of popular programs. Friends of the Brooklyn Park Library actively support the library through book sales, volunteering, and fundraising, in addition to being the voice of the library in the community.
