= Brookdale Library =

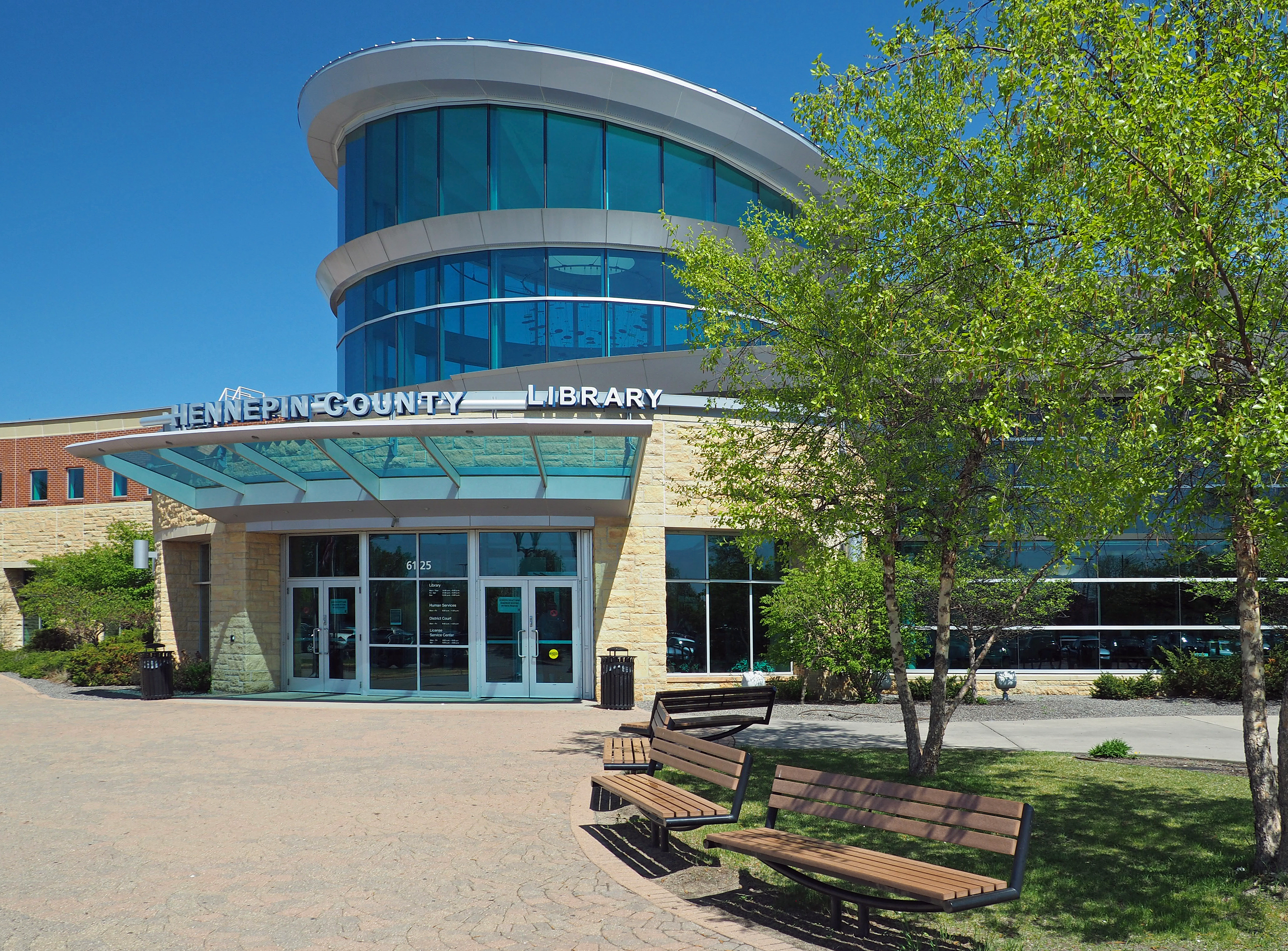

General information
- Location: 6125 Shingle Creek Pkwy, Brooklyn Center, Minnesota
- Coordinates: 45°3′58″N 93°18′38″W
- Opened: 1981

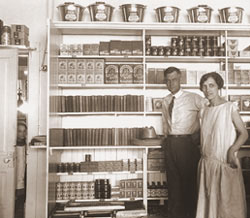
This 1925 deposit station at the Howe Store in Brooklyn Center was a predecessor of a freestanding Brooklyn Center Library

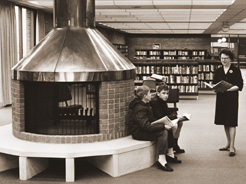
Brooklyn Center Library interior, 1965

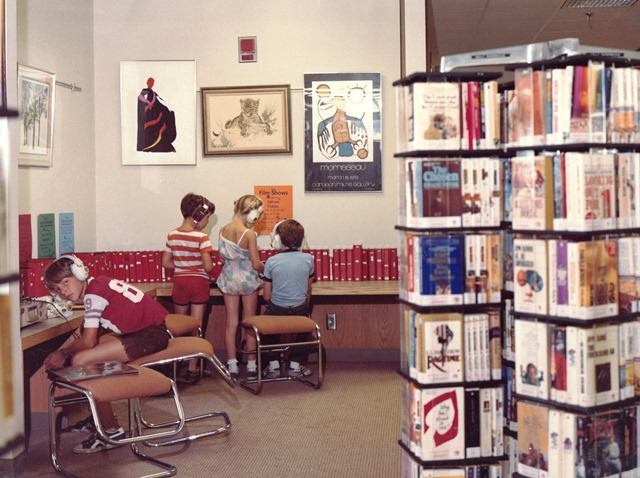
Teen area at Brookdale Library, 1980

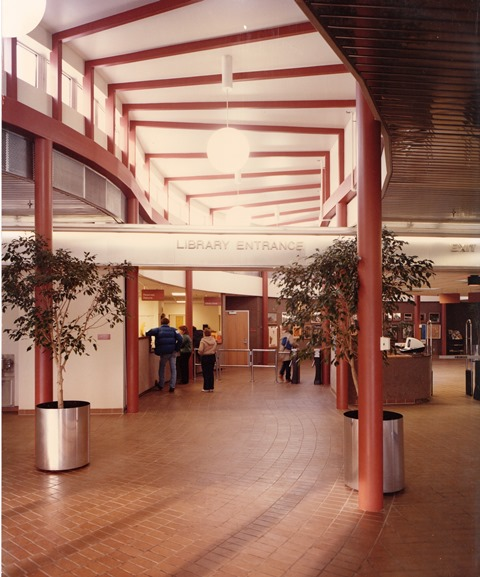
Brookdale Library entrance, 1980

Brookdale Library is a branch of Hennepin County Library serving the community of Brooklyn Center, Minnesota, United States. The library opened in its current location, 6125 Shingle Creek Parkway, in 1981. As the first structure in Hennepin County to be built in compliance with Minnesota's Sustainable Design Guide (now known as B3 Guidelines), it is one of three Hennepin County structures with a library, county courthouse, licensing and records services office, and social service and community corrections offices. Initially, the library's space was 31,400 square feet (2,920 m^{2}), including three meeting rooms. As the building abuts a swamp and nearby Shingle Creek, native plants were included in the landscaping, using trees, shrubs and plants that thrive in Minnesota's weather and support native animals and insects. A library in Brooklyn Center was part of Hennepin County's long-range library construction program which was published by the 1969 Minnesota State Legislature, authorizing three libraries: Southdale-Hennepin Area Library (Edina, opened in 1973); Ridgedale Hennepin Area Library (Minnetonka, opened in 1982); and Brookdale Library.

== Building expansion ==
Twenty years after it was built, the building was in need of several updates. The original design planned for future expansion to the facility. A $29.6 million renovation started in May 2002, and was part of the 2001-2005 Hennepin County Capital Improvement Plan. The library's tab for the 18-month long remodeling was $18 million. Upon reopening, the library's new footprint is 53,155 square feet (an increase of 22,000 square feet). The updates included 144 public access computers, a cyber café-styled teen zone, and space for an additional 50,000 books (making the collection about 150,000). The library is organized around "information neighborhoods", which marries collection materials with the right mix of technology, worktables, and chairs. Throughout, daylight filters in from large windows. Dedicated spaces are available for quiet study, meeting rooms, and a conference room.

== Previous library service ==
Preceding the building of its first library, Brooklyn Center had service from a Hennepin County Bookmobile. Brooklyn Center Junior Chamber of Commerce members believed that a library was an essential community resource, and met with Helen Young, Director of Hennepin County Library, to learn about what was required to launch the library. The first library in the village of Brooklyn Center (as it was then known), at 5601 Osseo Road (subsequently named Brooklyn Boulevard), opened on December 29, 1965. It was the first public library built in the United States which received funds from the 1964 Library Services and Construction Act. The $250,000 price tag was funded in part by the Federal Library Services Act ($60,000) and by bonds sold by the village of Brooklyn Center ($190,000). Designed by Cerny and Associates, it was 12,718 square feet (1,181.5 m^{2}). Books, staff, and furniture were all provided by Hennepin County.

By agreement of the city council, in January 1969, Brooklyn Center's library was sold to Hennepin County for $185,505 and the library's land was sold for an additional $34,745. By the summer of 1973, plans were published to replace it with a new Hennepin County Library structure, similar to the Southdale Hennepin Area Library which opened in July 1973. The library relocated to 6125 Shingle Creek Parkway in August 1981. The Girl Scouts purchased the building on Brooklyn Boulevard, and it became the headquarters of the Greater Minneapolis Girl Council (now Girl Scout Council of Greater Minneapolis).

== Art at the library ==
Ray King's "Northern Cascade" descends from the ceiling of the rotunda, playing with light reflecting from specially treated glass circles arrayed on a three-dimensional spiral-like structure. Depending on the viewer's perspective, time of day and quality of light, the whimsical installation evokes kaleidoscopes of iridescent light, prisms and reflections.

TivoliToo's "Readalot the Dragon" invites the library's young readers to cozy up near the friendly blue dragon with a book chosen from the shelf inside the curled dragon's tail or from the book nooks along either side of the sculpture.

Christopher T. Tully's "Jungle Animals Climbing" features a blue spotted hippo, a pink elephant with polka dot spots, a rhino, several tall birds with long lemon-yellow legs, and other magical creatures in the 30-foot-tall (9 m) sculpture. Topping it all off, children's puppet programs are offered in the ceiling-high puppet theater.

== Programming at the library ==
Supporting the cultural plurality of the neighborhood, the library's holdings include materials in Hmong, Laotian, Russian, Somali, Spanish, and Vietnamese. Almost 25% of Brooklyn Center's residents are foreign-born. Celebrating the vibrancy of the neighborhood, library programs range from “Día de los niños: ¡Basta!, arte y piñata/ Children's Day: Basta!, Art to Piñata” to “Opera Viva! Through the Eyes and Ears of Mozart” for children. Art exhibits at the library have included a curated program on the Laotian Diaspora.

Patrons attend baby and family storytimes, benefit from job search assistance, get help at the eReader Drop-In Clinic, polish computer skills with a variety of course offerings, or participate in the Teen Geekery Club. Job seekers can get tailored assistance at the library through a variety of classes each month.
