= Augsburg Park Library =

Library in Richfield, Minnesota, United States

Coordinates: 44°52′26″N 93°16′44″W

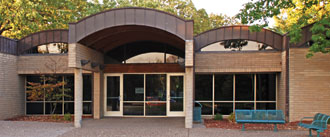
The current library, built in 1974, renovated in 2013.

Augsburg Park Library is a public library in Richfield, Minnesota. A Richfield branch library of Hennepin County Library has existed in various buildings in since 1951.

== Built in 1975 ==
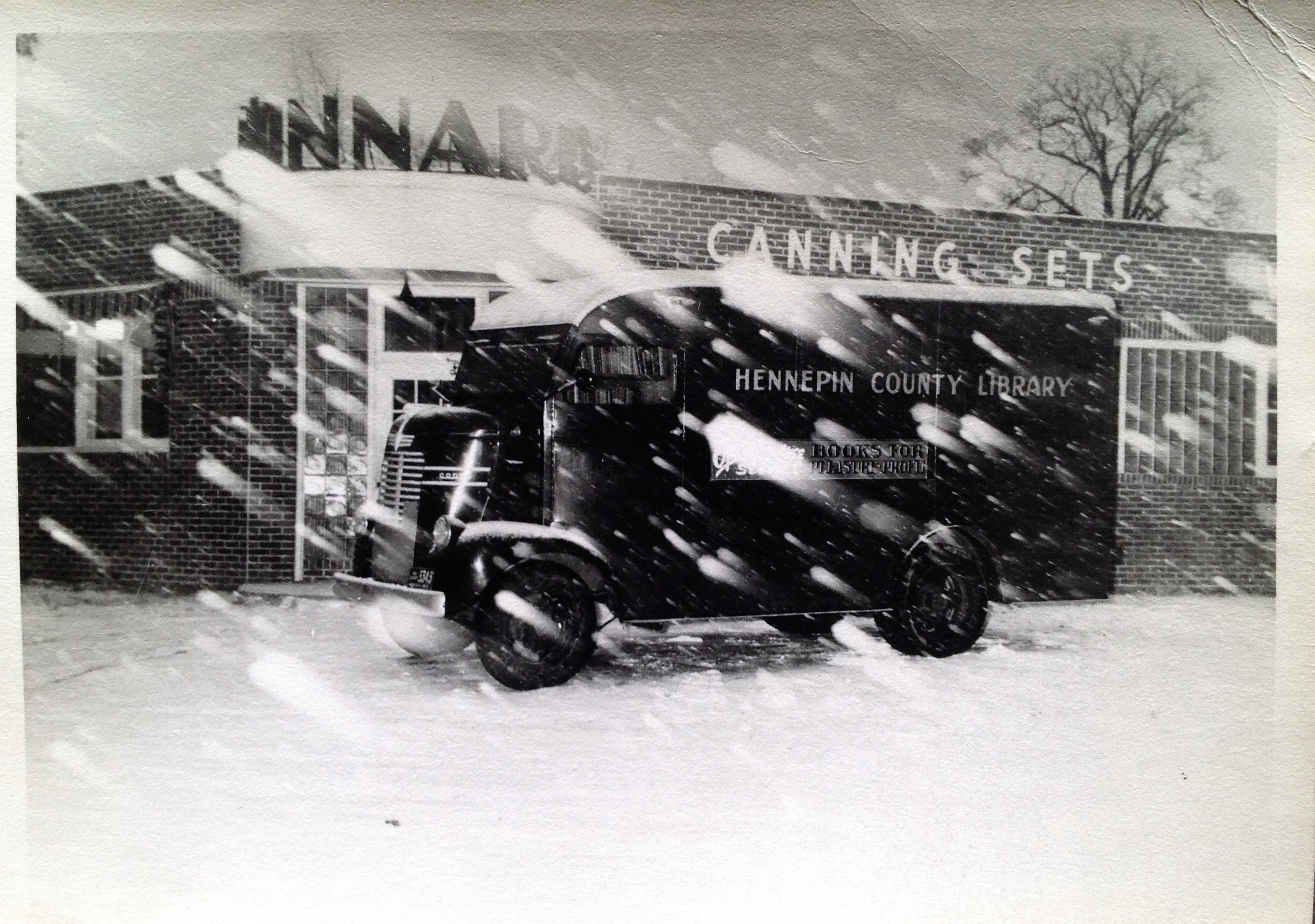
This bookmobile served Richfield until its public library opened in 1951.

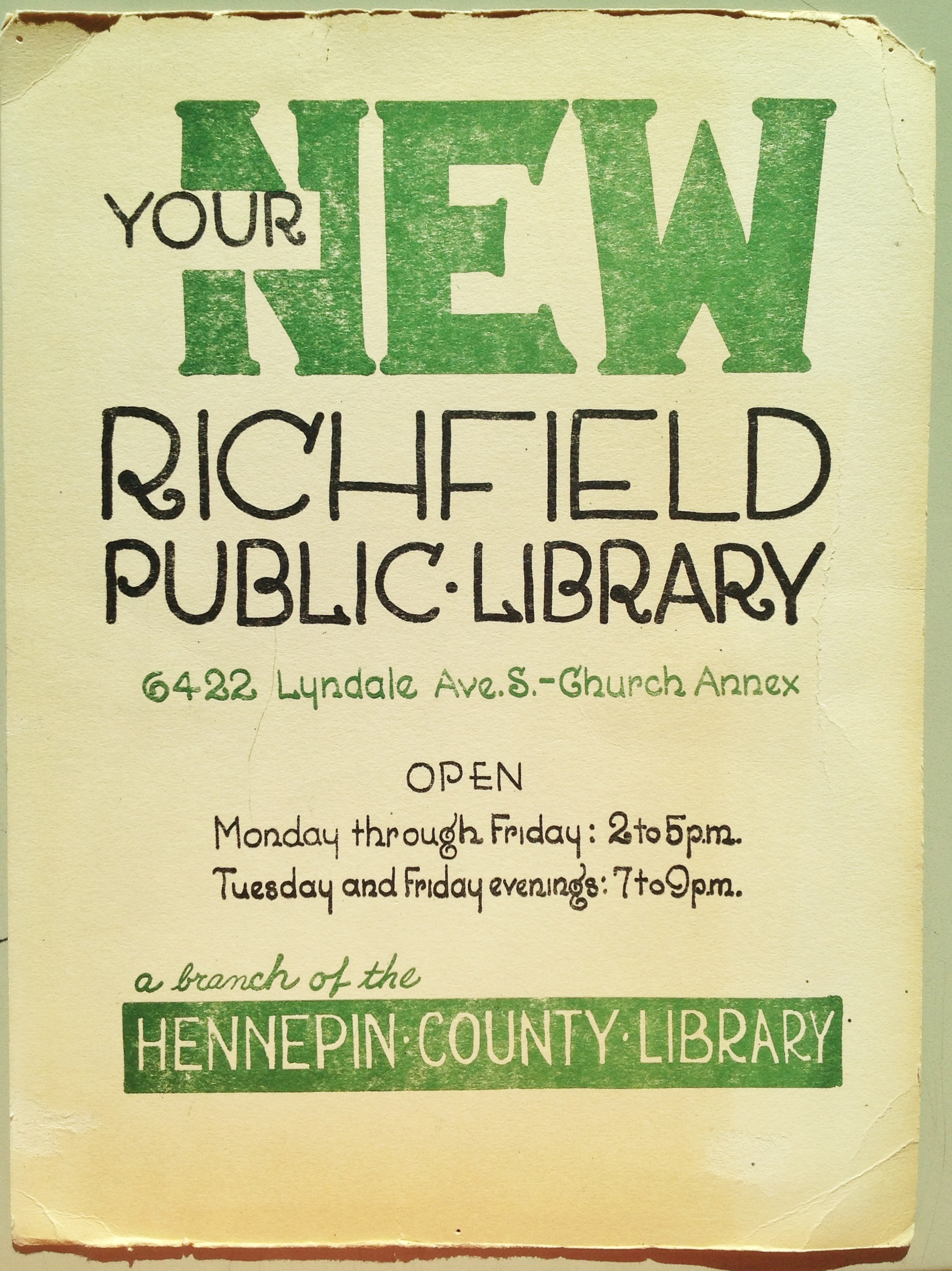
The library at 6422 Lyndale opened in 1951.

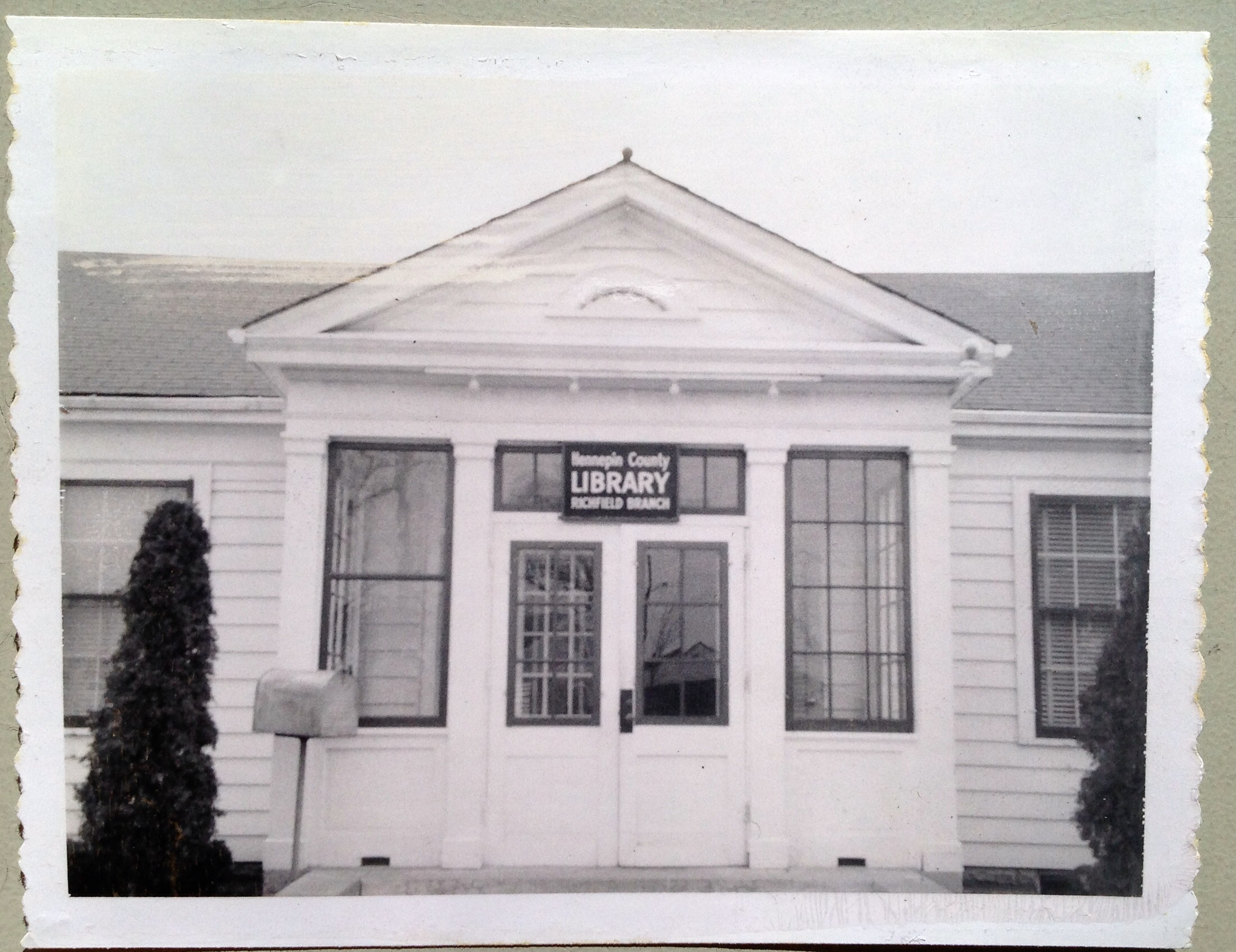
The library moved to 6700 Portland in 1952.

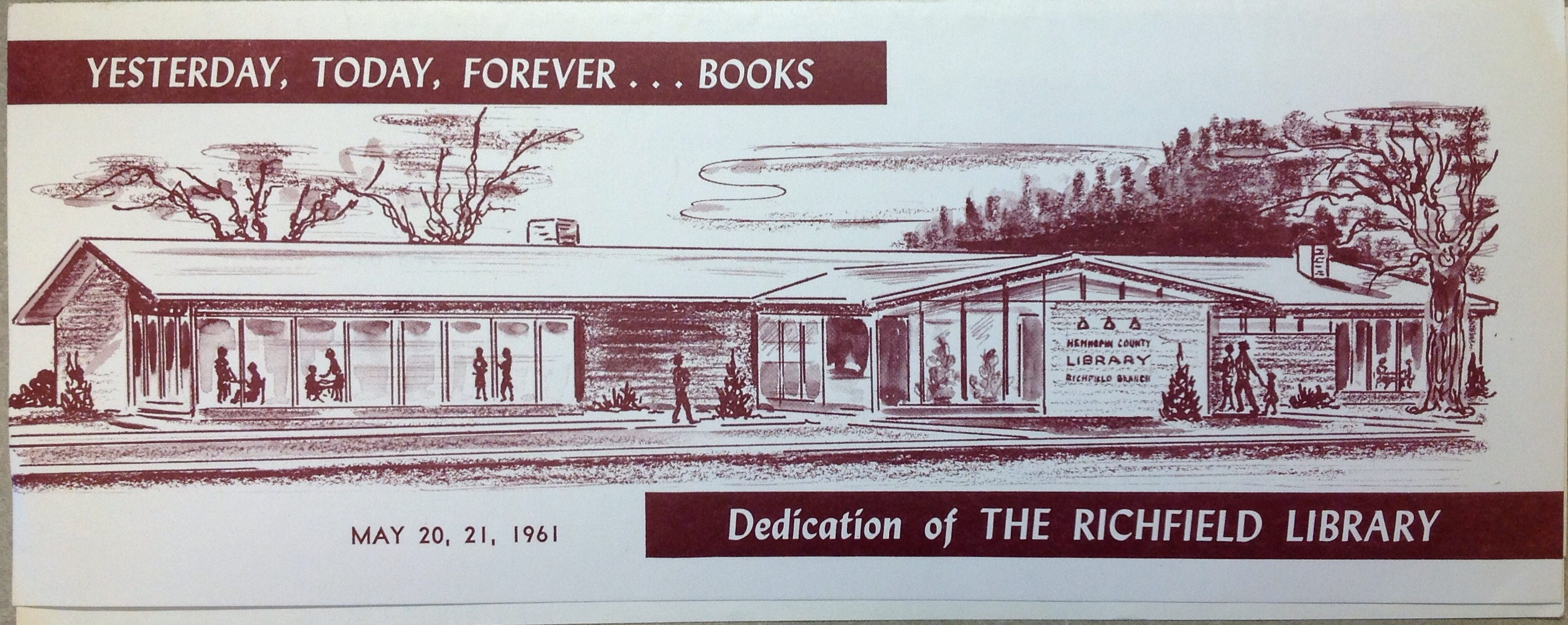
Announcement for the 1961 library built at 70th and Nicollet.

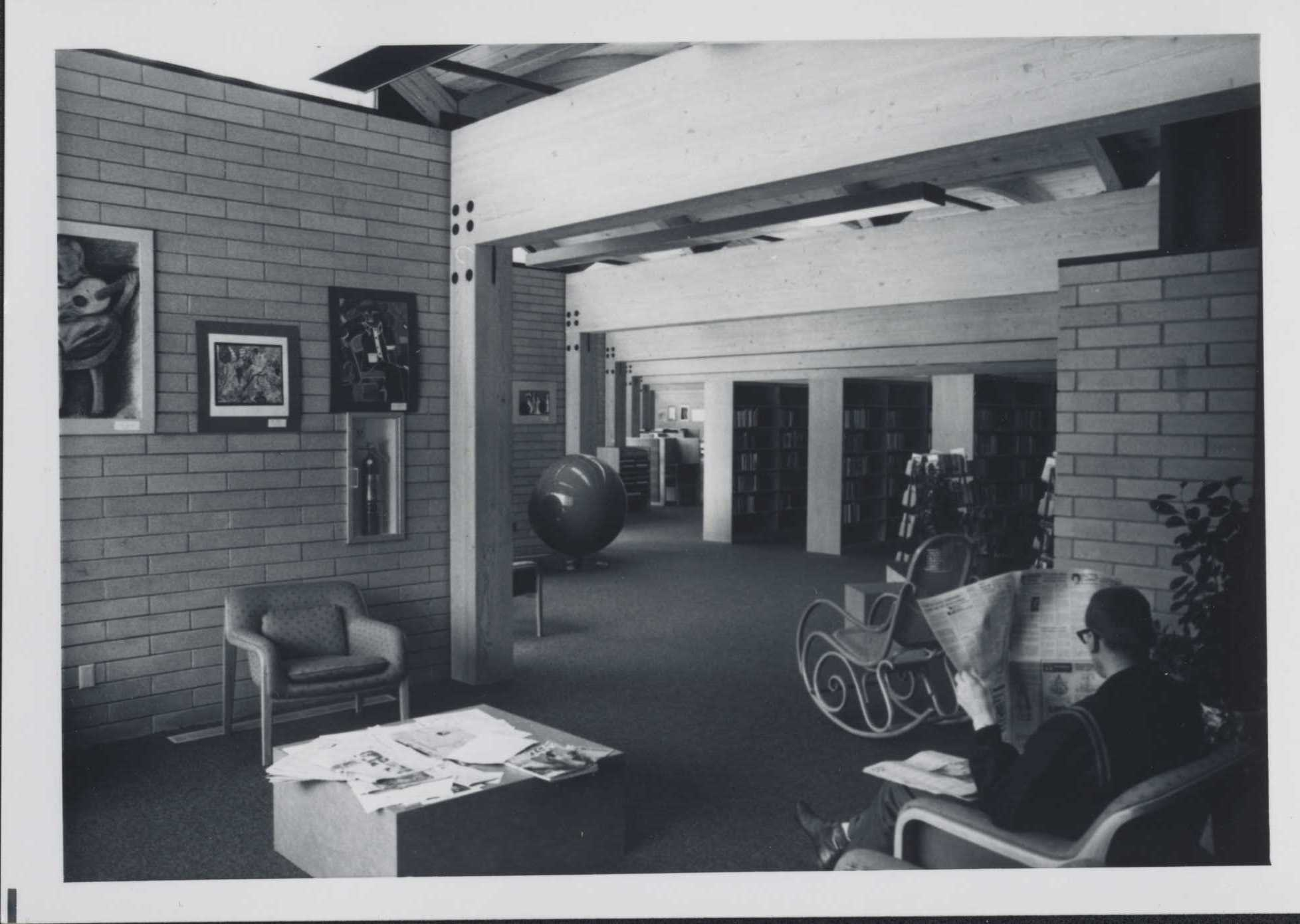
The interior of the library soon after opening.

Named after an adjacent park of the same name, Augsburg Park Library at 7100 Nicollet Avenue South opened in February 1975. Following the purchase of 2.8 acres of land by Hennepin County from the City of Richfield for $99,500, InterDesign, Inc. was chosen as the architect and ground was broken on December 20, 1973. The new library was two and a half times larger than its predecessor. Leading up to the approval of the construction, there was one significant and unexpected delay. Soil studies indicated that the ground at Nicollet and 72nd Avenue South consisted of alluvial soil, and needed to be removed before the building began, bumping up construction costs by $35,000. The contract to build the new facility was awarded to Henry O. Mikkelson Company.

This library was built on a portion of land previously purchased by the Village of Richfield from Augsburg College in 1949 for $60,000. Costs totaled $889,810 including construction, architect's fees, the land, landscaping and equipment. In creating the 15,000 square foot building, existing oak trees, remnants of the oak savanna, were retained, as the architects designed a building with staggered windows on the east and west sides.

Before there was a library in Richfield, residents’ needs were met with bookmobile service. The first Richfield branch of the Hennepin County Library opened in February 1951 in rented quarters in a church at 6422 Lyndale Avenue South and was known as the Richfield Library. That same year, the Friends of the Richfield Library Association was established, with a plan to fund the purchase of books, furniture and other necessary items for the new library. By 1959, Richfield Library was circulating some 100,000 books per year, the largest in Hennepin County. From 1952 to 1959, patrons grew from 1,540 to 16,000, respectively.

In September 1952, the library moved to 6700 Portland Avenue South. Richfield's population was growing rapidly and bookmobile stops were added to accommodate patrons. In 1961, the Hennepin County Library-Augsburg opened at 70th and Nicollet. Designed by architect Ralph Shimer, a Richfield resident, construction was funded in part through Richfield's municipal liquor store profits in the amount of $100,000. Additional funding of $20,000 was provided from Community Center Funds. Demand for services continued to grow, and resulted in the move to the new purpose-built library, its current location one block south of the 1961 locale. It is a geographic bookend to complement Hennepin County Central Library's position at the north end of Nicollet Avenue. Recently, Minneapolis – St. Paul Magazine chose Augsburg Community Library as “Hennepin County’s Best Library to Read In.”

== Remodeling ==
In August 2013, Augsburg Park Library closed for a one-month remodeling. Updates were made to the building (which had last been remodeled in 2003), with a focus on creating more natural light for patrons, a teen reading lounge, and the addition of a Family Play and Learn Spot with input from the Minnesota Children's Museum, which provides a dedicated area for children to share, create and play. Going well beyond the typical children's area, the Smart Play Spot supports pre-reading skills and engages adults in children's early literacy, providing activities for children's hands-on learning and opportunities to sing, write and play with other children.

== Programs ==
Serving a neighborhood in both Richfield and nearby Minneapolis, Augsburg Park's collection includes resources for Somali, Spanish and Vietnamese readers. Included in the library is a collection of folktales in Vietnamese cherished by patrons from Vietnam. Several days each week during the school year, homework helpers are available to tutor K-12 students. Since 2007, the library has co-hosted a kite festival in June in partnership with Friends of Augsburg Park Library and the Richfield Police. Ongoing programs include help with tax preparation, conversation circles for those wishing to improve their English language speaking skills, and Sing, Play, Learn! in collaboration with the MacPhail Center for Music.
