= Eden Prairie Library =

Public library in Eden Prairie, Minnesota, U.S.

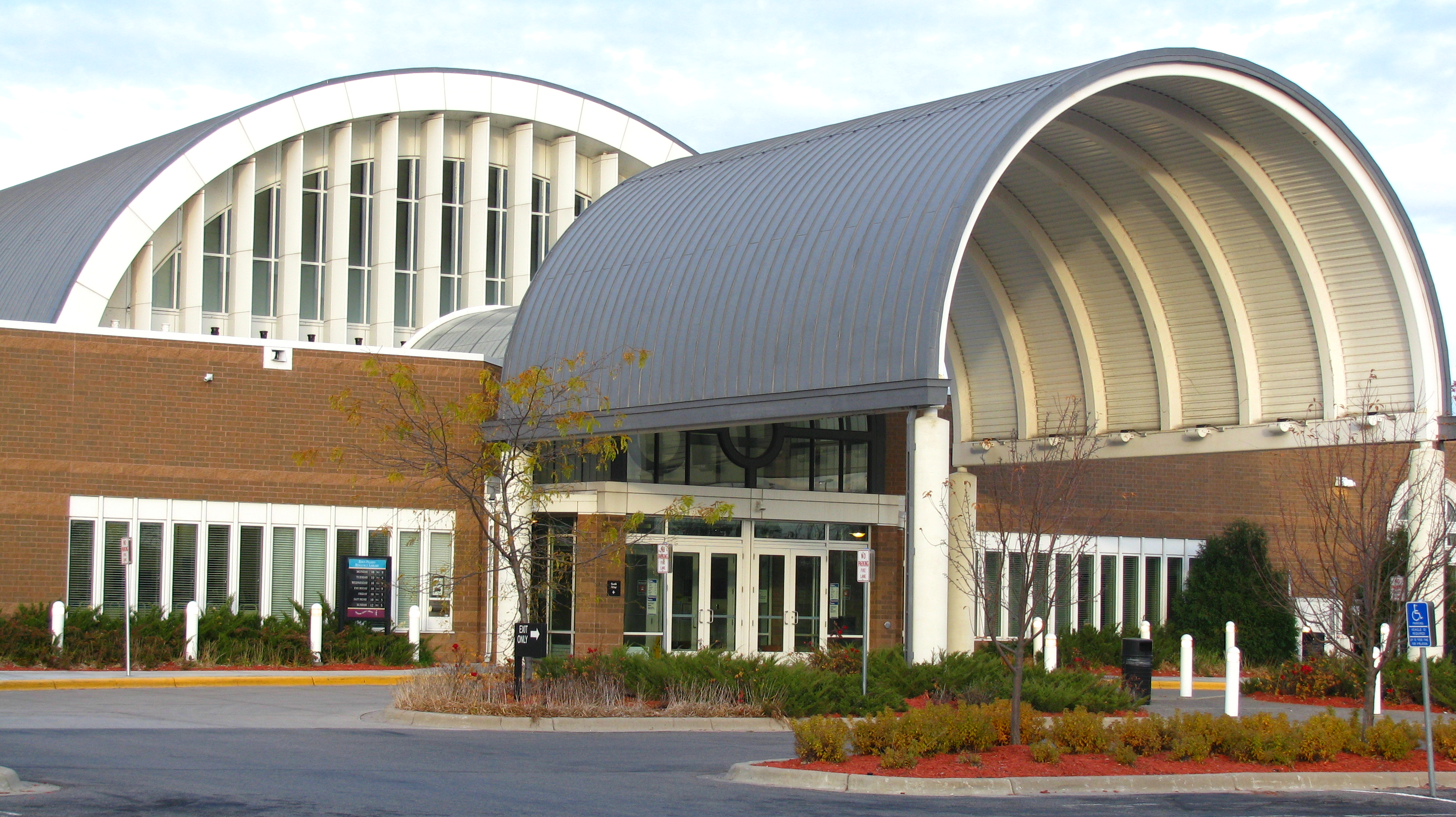
- Eden Prairie Library in 2011
- 44°51′1″N 93°25′41″W
- Location: Eden Prairie, Minnesota, US
- Established: August 12, 2004
- Architect: Bentz/Thompson/Rietow
- Branch of: Hennepin County Library

Other information
- Website: https://www.hclib.org/en/about/locations/eden-prairie

The Eden Prairie Library is located in Eden Prairie, Minnesota and is one of 41 libraries of the Hennepin County Library system. The 40,000 square foot building houses a collection of 150,000 items, an automated materials handling system (AMH) for check in and rough sortation of materials, 82 public computers, two meeting rooms, a reading lounge with fireplace, a teen area, a children's area with a Family Reading Lounge, and several installations of artwork. At the time of its opening in 2004, the Eden Prairie Library was the first public building in Minnesota to incorporate a hydrogen fuel cell to produce electricity (see below).

The Eden Prairie Library has the highest circulation of all the Hennepin County libraries; in 2012 the number of materials circulated amounted to over 1.165 million items.

== History ==
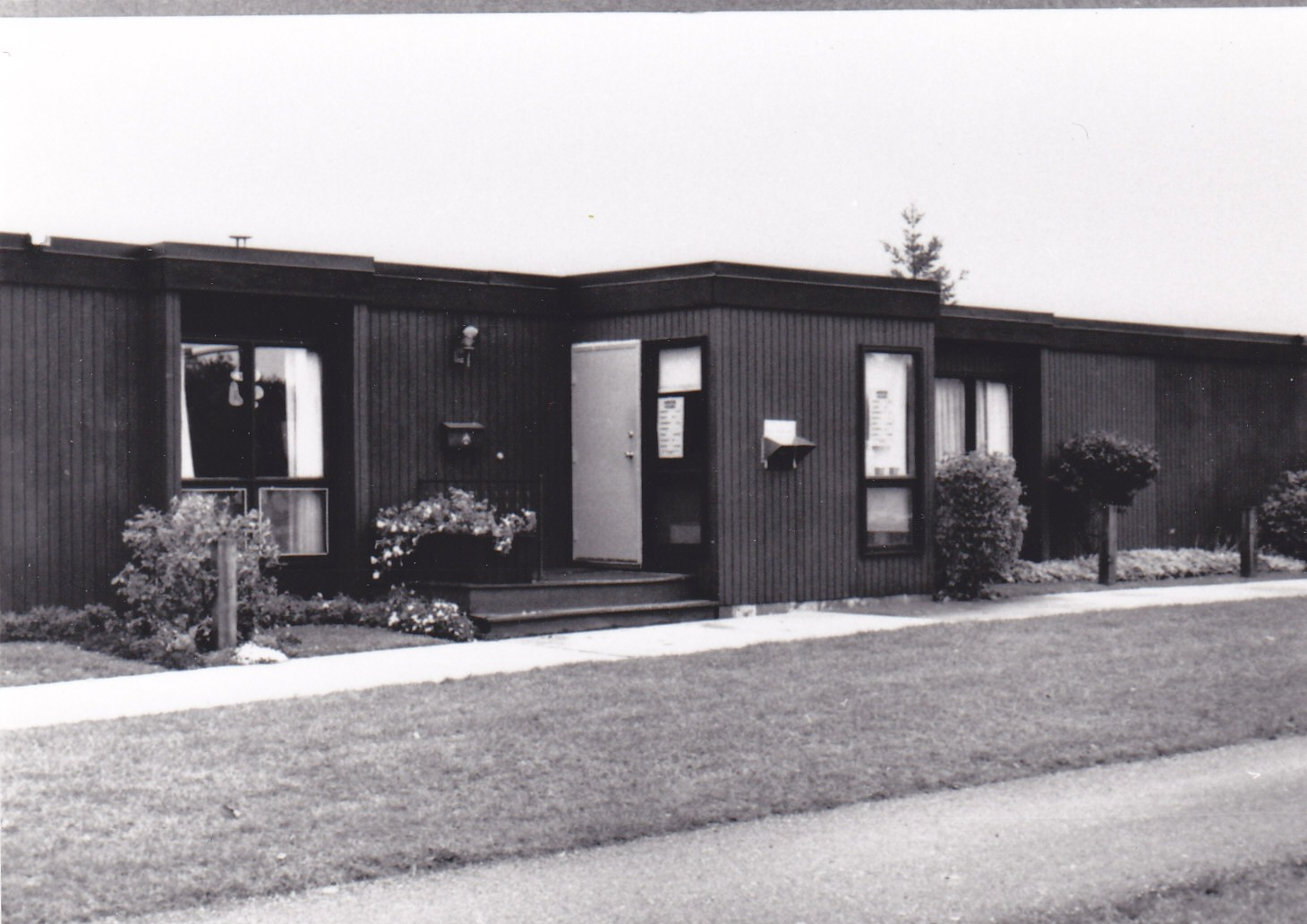
Eden Prairie Reading Center, ca. 1972

Eden Prairie's first community library was located in the Eden Prairie Consolidated School, which opened in 1924. The school board contracted with Hennepin County Library to use the school library space, and the first librarians were responsible for managing both the school and county library collections. Eventually the school collection increased to the point that there was no space for the county collection and the partnership with the school library was dissolved in the 1950s. The Hennepin County Bookmobile then served the community until the 1970s. The first independent location of the community library opened in 1972 as the Eden Prairie Reading Center, a 1540 square foot double Quonset hut located at 7420 Eden Prairie Road, with a collection of 12,000 items. In 1986 a new 15,000 square foot building was completed on Prairie Center Drive at a cost of $1.58 million. This new location became known as the Eden Prairie Community Library, with an expanded collection of 47,000 items.

Eden Prairie experienced rapid growth during the next two decades, growing from a population of 16,000 in 1980 to a population of 54,000 in 2000. Hennepin County Library saw the need for a larger facility in the community, and a new location became available one block away in a former Lund's grocery store space. Groundbreaking for the $17.6 million renovation project, designed by Minneapolis-based architects Bentz/Thompson/Rietow, took place in July 2002, but the project was put on hold in March 2003 when general contractor Oakwood Builders defaulted on construction work due to financial problems. The project suffered a six-month shut down until The Keystone Group was chosen to complete the construction. Water damage occurring during the shut down required remediation work, adding $1 million in cost to the county. After a delay of nearly a year the new Eden Prairie Library opened its doors to the public on August 12, 2004.

== Hydrogen fuel cell demonstration project ==
A hydrogen fuel cell installed in the Eden Prairie Library facility in 2004 was the first of its kind to be installed in a public building in Minnesota. The fuel cell project was funded by the Minnesota State Office of Environmental Assistance with additional support from CenterPoint Energy and 3M, and was incorporated into the building as a demonstration project of the county's “Green Building and Energy Conservation Initiatives.” Five kilowatts of electricity could be produced by the library's fuel cell, enough to power a typical home. The purpose of the demonstration project was to provide information on the fuel cell's operation to the Office of Environmental Assistance and to educate the public about fuel cell technology and potential applications.

== Artwork ==
Hennepin County Library incorporates public artwork into many of its locations. Through the One Percent for Art program, one percent (1%) of the project costs for building projects of $1 million or more is dedicated to the selection, purchase and installation of public artwork. The Eden Prairie Library installations of public artwork funded by the One Percent for Art program, include:

- Spiral by David Culver. Masonry treatment of stone, tile and brick, located on the north-facing exterior wall
- Untitled by David Culver. Masonry treatment of tile and stone, located on interior pillars
- Sleeping Man and Chants of the Prairie by Craig David. Masonry treatment of stone, tile and brick, located on outdoor planters at front entrance.

The planters include the following carved poem:

To Make a Prairie
by Emily Dickinson

To make a prairie it takes a clover and one bee,
One clover, and a bee.
And revery.
The revery alone will do,
If bees are few.

- Blackboard by Shari Cornish. Pigment painted industrial felt colored forms, 100% New Zealand wool knotted area, located in Children's Area
- ABC’s/Do You Know Them by Melissa Carden Bean. Ceramic tile mosaic, custom metal hooks, children's coat rack located in Children's Area
