= Oxboro Library =

Public library in Bloomington, Minnesota, United States

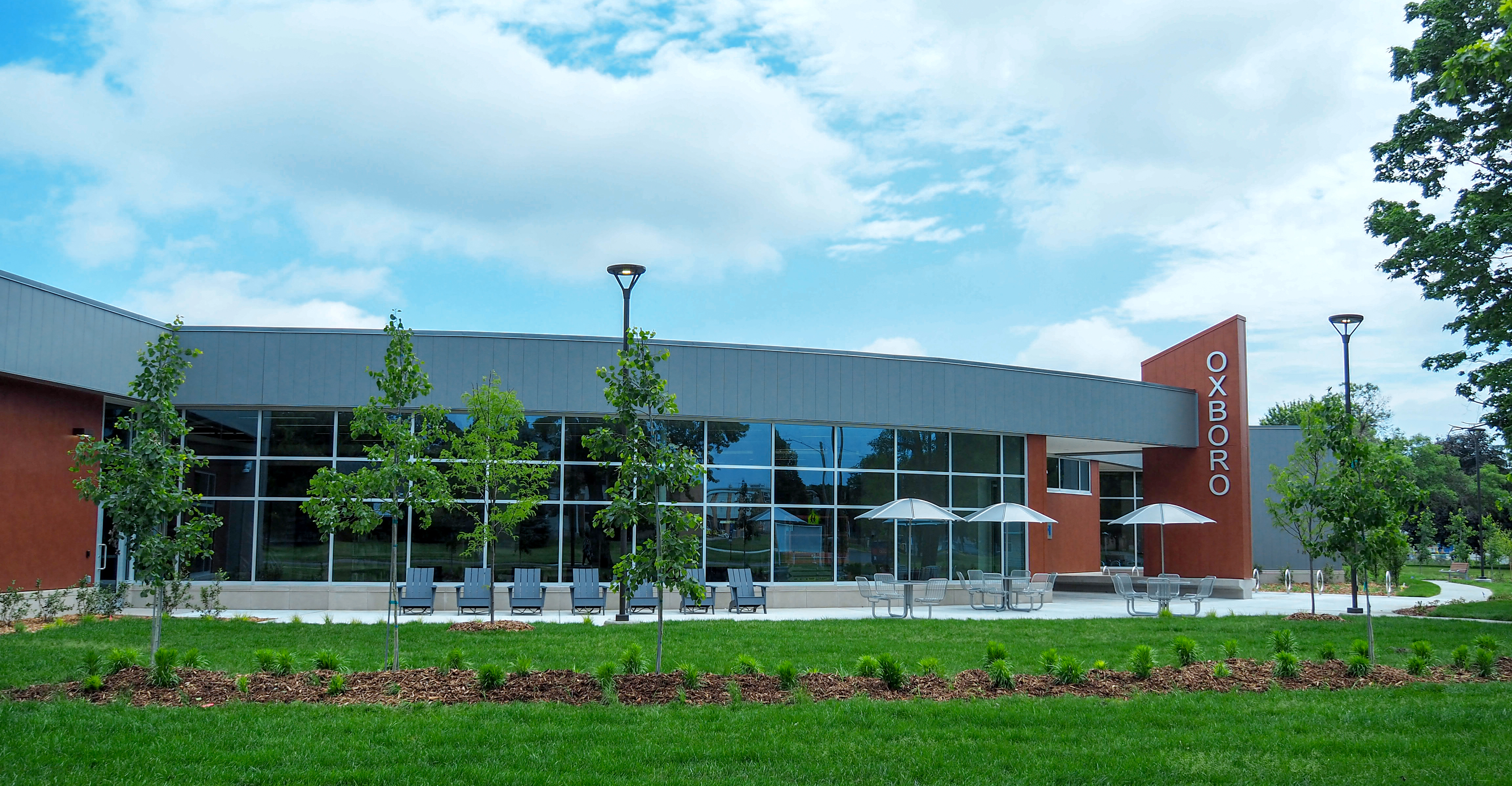
- Oxboro Library, June 2019
- 44.844280605576685°N 93.2667062371339°W
- Location: Bloomington, Minnesota, United States
- Type: Public library

Other information
- Parent organization: Hennepin County Library
- Website: https://www.hclib.org/oxboro

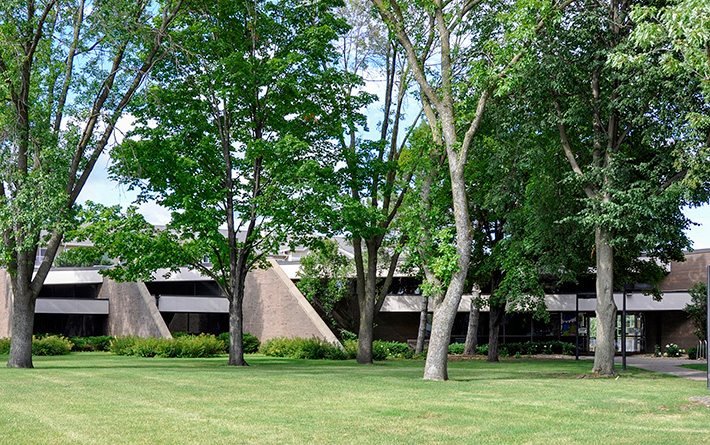
Oxboro Library prior to 2019 renovation

Oxboro Library is a public library in Bloomington, Minnesota, United States. It serves the residents in the Bloomington and Richfield area. It is the second free standing library built in the city, replacing the former library that stood from 1962-1973. It opened on December 16, 1974, then was renovated in 2003-04 and again in 2018-19. The library was designed by Kilstofte Associates Architects from Wayzata, Minnesota. The total cost to build the library was $770,000 in 1975.

== History ==
Originally, the only library that stood in Bloomington was located on Nicollet Ave and was called the Bloomington Library. The Bloomington Library was a remodeled supermarket turned library and opened in 1961 serving about 22,000 guests in the community. The city later outgrew the library and due to its size could no longer properly serve all of the city of Bloomington. The requests for larger and more library locations to city council and Hennepin County began only a few years after its opening.

Oxboro Library sits on the site of a former two-acre dairy farm in Bloomington. Due to interest in the site for the new library, Hennepin County had offered to purchase the land from the Erasmus Bischof family, who had owned the land since 1912. The farm was condemned by the county in April 1972. The family was offered $73,800 to sell the land for future developments including the Oxboro Library. Hennepin County purchased the two acre farm for the placement of the Oxboro Library. The Bischof farm would move to Chaska, Minnesota. Today, the library sits on the old Bischof home and barn site.

== Naming the library ==
The Oxboro Library name is derived from the historic neighborhood in which it is located. Four brothers named Thomas, Wallace, John, and Robert Oxborough settled in the Lyndale Avenue area. In 1910, the Dan Patch railroad was built through Bloomington and established a station on Matthew Oxborough’s land. The station was named Oxborough Heath. As more businesses were established in the area, more traffic went through the Oxborough Heath. With the increase in traffic, the name was then shortened to Oxboro. Due to the suggestion of the Oxboro Junior Federated Women’s Club, the new Bloomington library would be named Oxboro Library, using a name from the area’s history.

== Opening ==
Ground was broken on September 27, 1973. The library opened on December 16, 1974. Oxboro was the first Hennepin County library designed to accommodate a wide variety of audio-visual materials alongside its print media collection. The original Media Center housed units to play records, cassettes, and eight-tracks. It was also equipped with projectors for 8mm and 16mm, sound filmstrips and television for watching cable or video cassettes.

== Renovations ==
The first renovation to the library was November 2003 to April 2004. The project was designed by architects Hagen, Christensen and McIlwain. Apart from new lights and chairs, the renovation included the addition of wireless internet, new World Languages area, and express checkout. The world languages area included magazines, newspapers, books and audiovisual materials in Spanish, Vietnamese, Hmong, Somali, Russian, and French. During the renovation, the library expanded its quiet study areas.

Oxboro Library was under renovation from August 2018 until July 10, 2019. The most recent renovations included updates to seating, shelving, carpet, and lighting. The plans also included designated areas for toddlers and teens, spaces for collaborative and quiet study, and additions to the library computers. The renovation budget is $6.7 million.

== Art at the Library ==
Featured art is a print of a painting below the Bloomington Ferry Bridge by Rex Mhiripiri. Donated by the artist, the work was installed in the library’s main room during the library’s renovation in 2004. The mile long bridge sits over the Minnesota River connecting Bloomington to Shakopee, Minnesota.

Mhiripiri specializes in showcasing Zimbabwean art and stone sculptures of the Shona people. Apart from showcasing cultural art pieces, his paintings feature Minnesotan landscapes and African animals.
