= Southdale Library =

Public library in Edina, Minnesota

Coordinates: 44°52′32″N 93°19′11″W

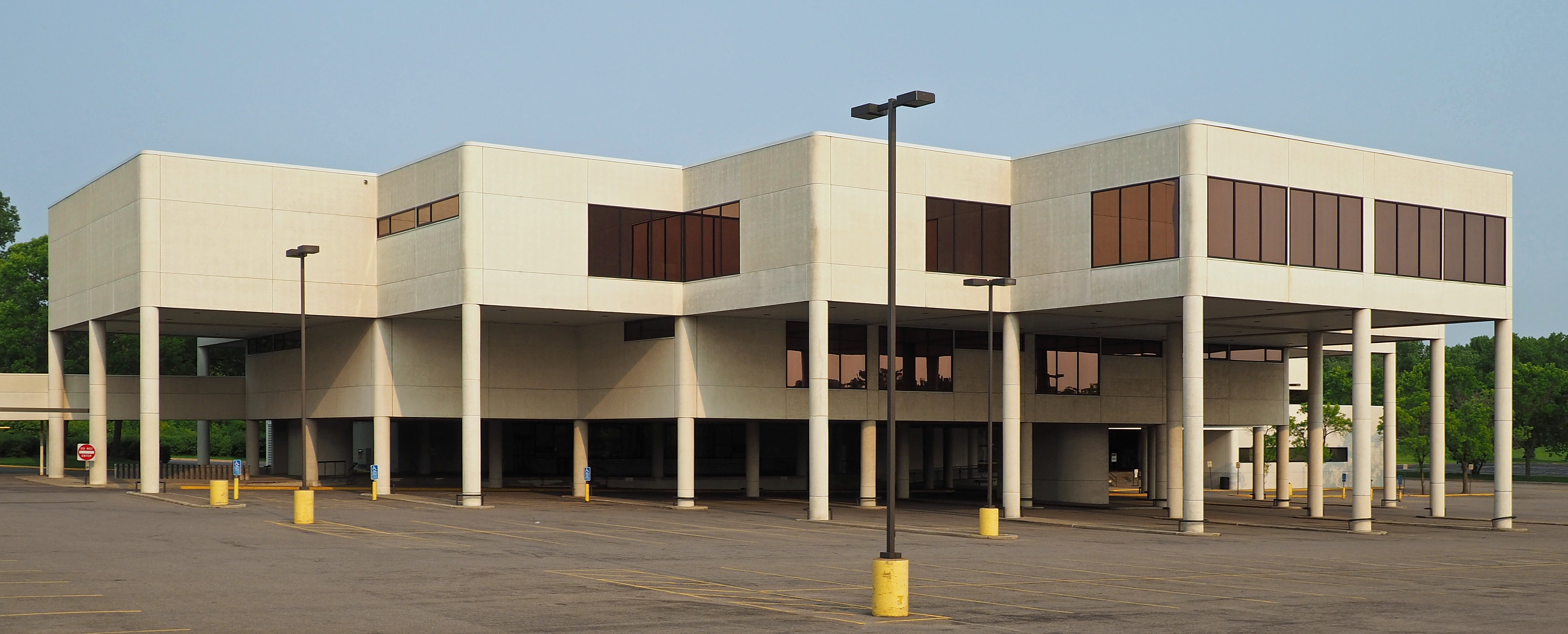
Southdale Library viewed from the northwest

Southdale Library is an American public library that closed on January 6, 2025. A brand new Southdale Library will be built on the existing site. The new building will be shared with the Edina Art Center and is planned to open in Summer 2027. It is located in Edina, Minnesota, United States. At 60,000 square feet, it is one of the largest in the Hennepin County Library system. The building was a part of a complex that also housed district courts. The library offers materials in English, Chinese, Russian, Somali, Spanish, and Vietnamese.

== History ==
When the library opened in November 1973, it was the third largest public library in Minnesota with a 200,000 volume collection. Southdale opened with audio-visual materials and equipment including computers, televisions, recorders, projectors, videotape equipment, and the ability to connect to six-channel copper loops to listen to audio materials via headphones.

The library was initially among the libraries funded by Hennepin County after the State Legislature authorized the county’s long-range building program in 1969. This legislation created a 15-year program including $20 million, some of which helped fund the library. The library served as the headquarters of Hennepin County Library until the Ridgedale Library was built in 1982.

Renovations were completed in several phases. The first phase was the expansion of their parking lot from September to November 1992. The next phase included expanding the interior for additional square footage to the library and upgrades to the building. The final phase was completed on January 1 to March 13, 1994.

== Art ==
Untitled by Christopher Tully is the one prominent piece of art featured in the Southdale Library children's area. "Untitled" is an installation of several animal sculptures including fish, birds and hippopotami. Christopher Tully’s sculptures are displayed throughout the children's area. Tully is a Minnesota artist who creates large scale sculptures and installation pieces of whimsical animal characters and nature scenes.
