= Minneapolis Public Library =

Library

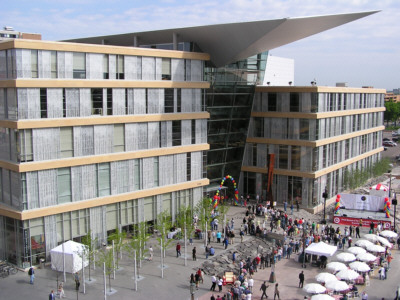
The new Central Library, designed by César Pelli, completed in 2006

The Minneapolis Public Library (MPL) was a library system that served the residents of Minneapolis, Minnesota, United States. It was founded in 1885 with the establishment of the Minneapolis Library Board by an amendment to the Minneapolis City Charter, and six of its eight members were elected by city residents. Lumber baron and philanthropist T. B. Walker and other city leaders such as Thomas Lowry were members of the first library board. In 2008, after some financial difficulties, the library was merged into the Hennepin County Library system. At the time of its merger, the library included Central Library in downtown Minneapolis and 14 branch libraries. Its collection numbered about 3.1 million items with about 2.2 million of these housed in the central library.

== Central Library ==
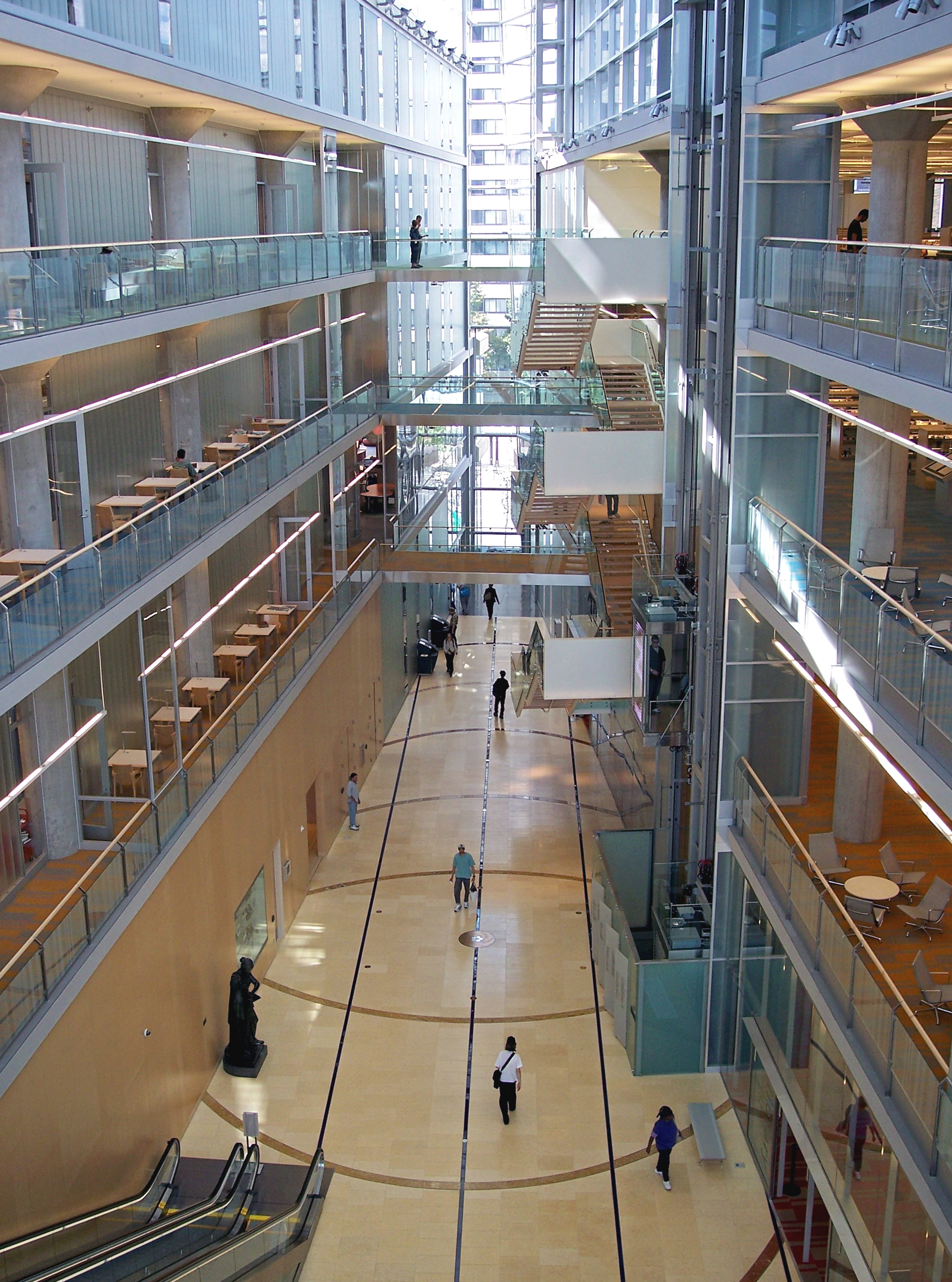
The atrium of the Central Library

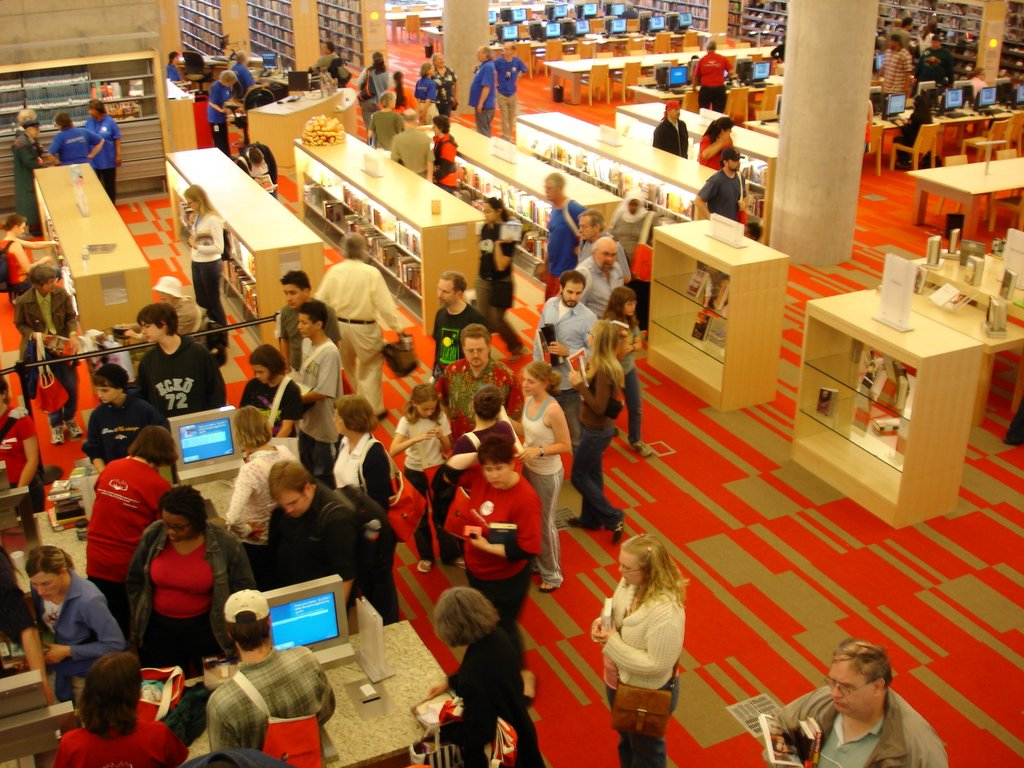
Interior of Central Library in 2006

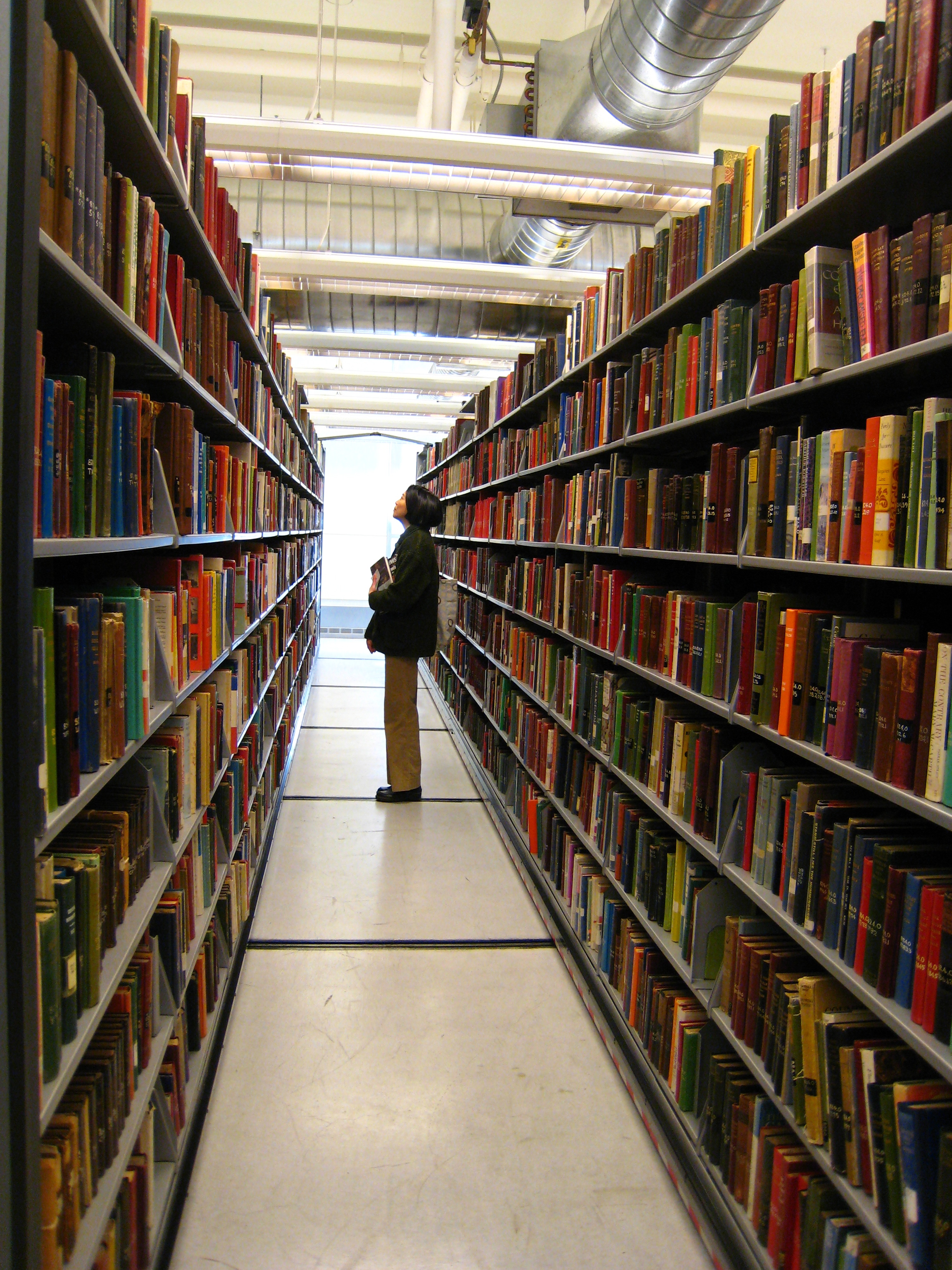
Periodical stacks at the Central Library

The predecessor of Minneapolis's public library was a private library called the Minneapolis Athenæum. It was organized by Minneapolis businessmen in 1859 as a subscription library, and its shares were traded on the local stock market. After T. B. Walker moved to Minneapolis he bought shares in the Athenæum and gave away memberships to it, promoting the idea of a free public library for the city. Other stock holders raised objections, but the technique worked and soon the city financed a free library for the public with a one mill property tax. When the Minneapolis Public Library was established in 1885 the Athenæum became a partner of it and still exists as a separate nonprofit organization sharing space with the library.

Three central libraries have been built in Minneapolis, each replacing the last with a bigger and more up-to-date building. The first opened in 1889, the second in 1961 and the third and current building in 2006.

On November 7, 2000, Minneapolis voters approved a $140 million package to improve library services, including funding a new Central Library building. The building was designed by Cesar Pelli, along with the Minneapolis firm Architectural Alliance, It opened to the public on May 20, 2006. At a cost of $250 per square foot, the library features a host of energy-efficient measures, including a roof garden and substantial daylight. While the building was under construction, most services were provided at the interim Central Library Marquette location, on two floors in Marquette Plaza (formerly the Federal Reserve Bank of Minneapolis). Cost of providing an interim site while the old library was demolished and rebuilt exceeded $10 million.

Until the 2002 closure and demolition of the old central library, the Minneapolis Planetarium found its home there, possessing a projector machine literally older than the space age itself (originally delivered and installed in 1954, three years before the launch of Sputnik I). In 2005, the Minnesota Legislature apportioned funding for a new planetarium, then planned to be on the roof of the new Central Library building. Instead, the planetarium became part of the new Bell Museum of Natural History on the University of Minnesota Saint Paul campus.

== Community libraries ==
The first two branches of the Minneapolis Public Library opened in 1890, one each on the north and south sides of Minneapolis. A branch in the basement of North High School opened on February 27, 1890, and one at 17th and Franklin Ave on April 23. By 2002 there were fourteen branches or community libraries. Each library had a staff member who was assigned to local schools to discuss the services available at the library.

The 2002 referendum also included funds to renovate community libraries, supplementing an existing program. The community libraries and their renovation status are:

- East Lake Community Library, built 1976, renovated 2007
- Franklin Community Library, built 1914, renovated 2005
- Hosmer Community Library, built 1916, renovated 1997
- Linden Hills Community Library, built 1931, renovated 2002
- Nokomis Community Library, built 1968, renovated 2009–2011
- North Regional Community Library, built 1971, renovated 2007
- Northeast Community Library, built 1973, reopened after renovation in 2011
- Pierre Bottineau Community Library, built 2003 in the Grain Belt Brewery complex to replace an older storefront library
- Roosevelt Community Library, built 1927, renovated and expanded 2013
- Southeast Community Library, built 1963
- Sumner Community Library, built 1915, renovated 2005
- Walker Community Library, first built in 1915 (original building now privately owned), a replacement was built in 1981, which was demolished and replaced by a building that opened in 2014
- Washburn Community Library, built 1970, expanded 1992, renovated 2014
- Webber Park Community Library, built 1980, razed in 2013. Now in a new building on 4440 Humboldt Avenue that opened in May 2017

== Historic buildings ==
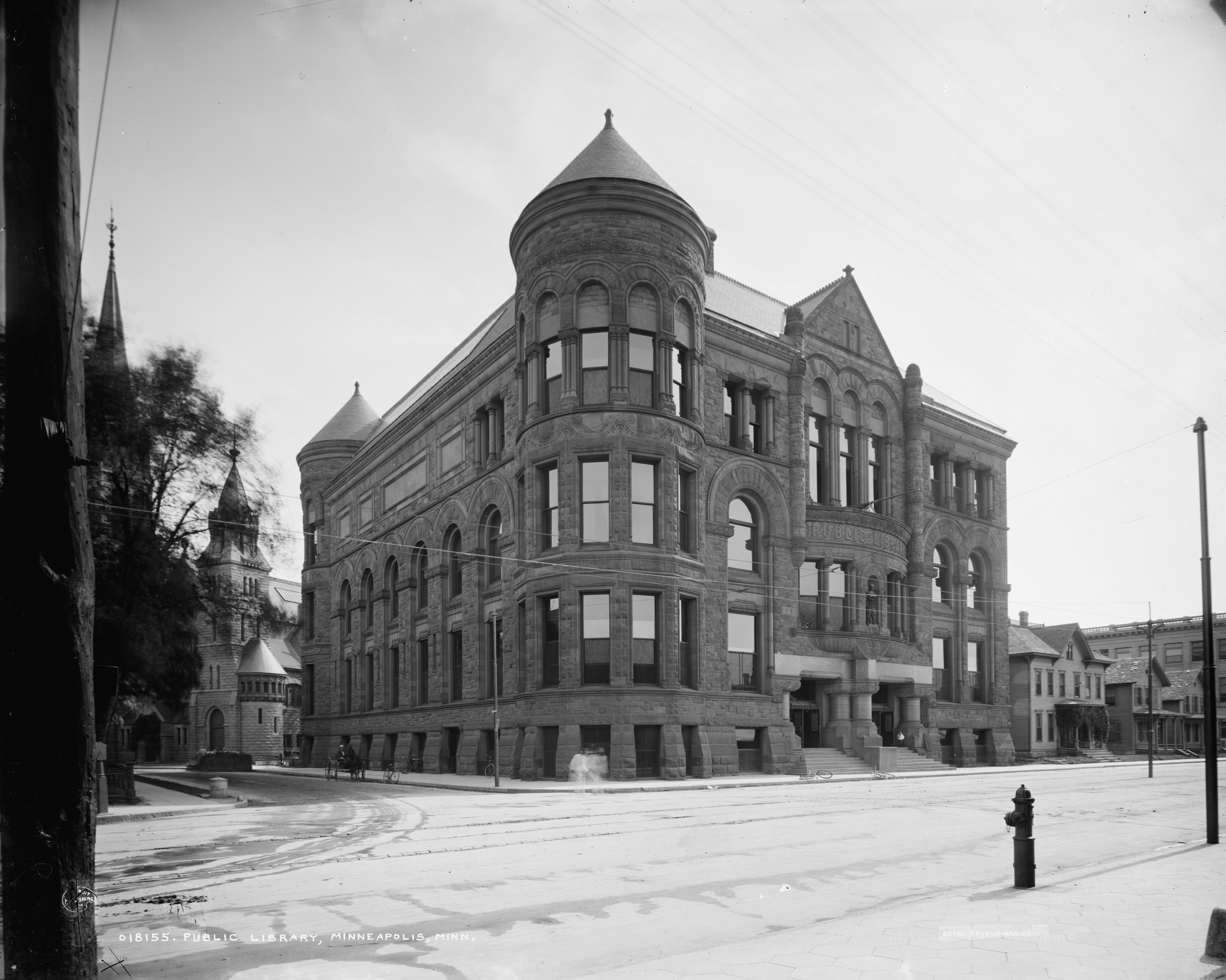
The first central Minneapolis Public Library pictured in the early 20th century cost $324,894.

Many of the buildings built by the Minneapolis Public Library system are listed on the National Register of Historic Places. In some cases, the libraries have been demolished and moved to new, more modern buildings.

- East Lake Community Library, original building at 2916 East Lake Street (since moved to 2727 East Lake Street). The building now houses a liberal political products store.
- Franklin Community Library, current building at 1314 East Franklin Ave.
- Linden Hills Branch Library, current building at 2900 W. 43rd St.
- Minneapolis Public Library, North Branch, original building at 1834 Emerson Ave. N. The North branch was closed not long after the much larger North Regional Library opened at 1315 Lowry Ave. N. about a mile away.
- Roosevelt Community Library, current building at 4026 28th Ave. S.
- Sumner Branch Library, current building at 611 Emerson Ave. N.
- Thirty-sixth Street Branch Library, current building at 347 E. 36th. St., since renamed to Hosmer Community Library
- Walker Branch Library, original building at 2901 Hennepin Ave. S. (since moved across the street to 2880 Hennepin Avenue) Some had suggested that the Walker library be moved back to its original building as it was vacant and the new underground facility has been dogged by maintenance issues; however the original library building is still privately owned.

Of this list, all but the North Branch library were built under the leadership of the city's head librarian, Gratia Countryman. Franklin, Sumner, and Thirty-Sixth Street were built with funds from Andrew Carnegie.

== Cataloging ==
Unusually for a public library, the Minneapolis Public Library used the Library of Congress Classification. Prior to 1969 it used the Dewey Decimal System, although around 1890, the library switched to the early and short-lived Putnam Classification System, developed by Minneapolis librarian Herbert Putnam. He later became Librarian of Congress, and revised his Putnam system into the current Library of Congress classification system.

== Events: 2000–2008 ==
=== 2000 referendum ===
In 2000 Minneapolis voters approved a $140 million package to fund a new $110 million Central Library building, and spend $30 million on improvements to community libraries. The referendum began as a framework for discussion called Outlook Twenty Ten: A Discussion Plan to Improve All Minneapolis Community Libraries, submitted to the Minneapolis Public Library Board in July 1999, and drafted in anticipation of voters approving the referendum. The framework was submitted to the board by Amy Ryan, Chief of Community Libraries. When the referendum was approved, the Library Board turned to the plan which contained a profile of each of the fourteen community libraries, including highlights of patron surveys. It also contained at least three suggestions for every community library, entitled Options 'A', 'B', 'C' and onward. An update on the plan came out in 2004.

=== Adamson v. Minneapolis Public Library ===
Adamson v. Minneapolis Public Library was a civil complaint of 23 March 2003 by a dozen librarians against the library's management for a claimed failure to prevent sexual harassment over many years by library patrons having unlimited use of library computers for accessing pornography. The case followed an EEOC determination on 23 May 2001 that "the Respondent did subject the Charging Party to sexually hostile work environment. This is in violation of Title VII of the Civil Rights Act of 1964, as amended." The case settled when the library agreed to pay the plaintiffs $435,000 and to take corrective action to prevent further harassment.

=== Funding crisis and merger with Hennepin County Libraries ===
Despite city funding and some private support, the library had suffered from reduced funding from external sources, including the federal government and Local Government Aid (LGA) from the State of Minnesota. In the recession of the 2000s following the Dot-com bubble, hours were drastically cut and money for acquisitions sharply declined. Because Minnesota library card holders could borrow from other systems in the state, MPL also duplicated services offered by Hennepin County Library (HCL), which saw shared use by MPL patrons. This was especially apparent on Mondays, when Minneapolis libraries were closed.

In 2007, the Minneapolis Library Board agreed to pursue a merger with the county system. The Minneapolis Library Board and Minneapolis City Council approved the merger in March 2007, the Hennepin County Board approved the merger in April 2007, and on May 19, 2007 the Minnesota State Legislature approved a bill merging the systems effective January 1, 2008. The merged system is the Hennepin County Library with 41 locations. The final meeting of the publicly elected Minneapolis Public Library Board of Trustees took place on December 19, 2007. From 2008 onward, the library board trustees have been appointed by Hennepin County commissioners, and can set policy, but have no budgetary control.

== Directors ==
There were 11 full-time directors in the history of the MPL.

- Herbert Putnam, 1888–1891
- James Kendall Hosmer, 1892–1904
- Gratia Countryman, 1904–1936
- Glenn M. Lewis (interim), 1936–1937
- Carl Vitz, 1937–1945
- Glenn M. Lewis, 1946–1957
- Raymond E. Williams, 1957–1963
- Margaret M. Mull (interim), 1963–1964
- Ervin J. Gaines, 1964–1974
- Mary L. Dyer (interim), 1974–1975
- Joseph Kimbrough, 1975–1989
- Susan Goldberg Kent, 1990–1995
- Mary Lawson, 1996–2002
- Jan Feye-Stukas (interim), 2002–2003
- Katherine G. Hadley, 2003–2007
- Jane Eastwood (interim), 2007–2008
