= Gratia =

Gratia may refer to:

- Gratia (goddess), a goddess in Greek mythology
- Gratia, Teleorman, a commune in Romania
- Gratia (Paul McCartney song)
- Gratia (mayfly), a genus of small minnow mayflies
- 424 Gratia, a large main belt asteroid
- HTC Gratia, a model of smartphones
- USS Gratia (AKS-11), a 1944 Acubens-class general stores issue ship

== People with the name ==
- Charles Louis Gratia (1815–1911), French painter and pastel artist
- Gratia Countryman (1866–1953), American librarian
- Gratia Schimmelpenninck van der Oye (1912–2012), former Dutch alpine skier

== See also ==
- Ex gratia ("From kindness"), in law
- Sola gratia, one of the Five solae during the Protestant Reformation
- Dei Gratia (disambiguation)
