= Gratias =

Gratias is a surname. Notable people with the surname include:

- Arthur Gratias (1920–2015), American politician
- Denis Gratias (born 1947), French scientist

== See also ==
- Gratia (disambiguation)
