= Walker Library (Minneapolis) =

- Walker Branch Library
- U.S. National Register of Historic Places
- Minneapolis Landmark
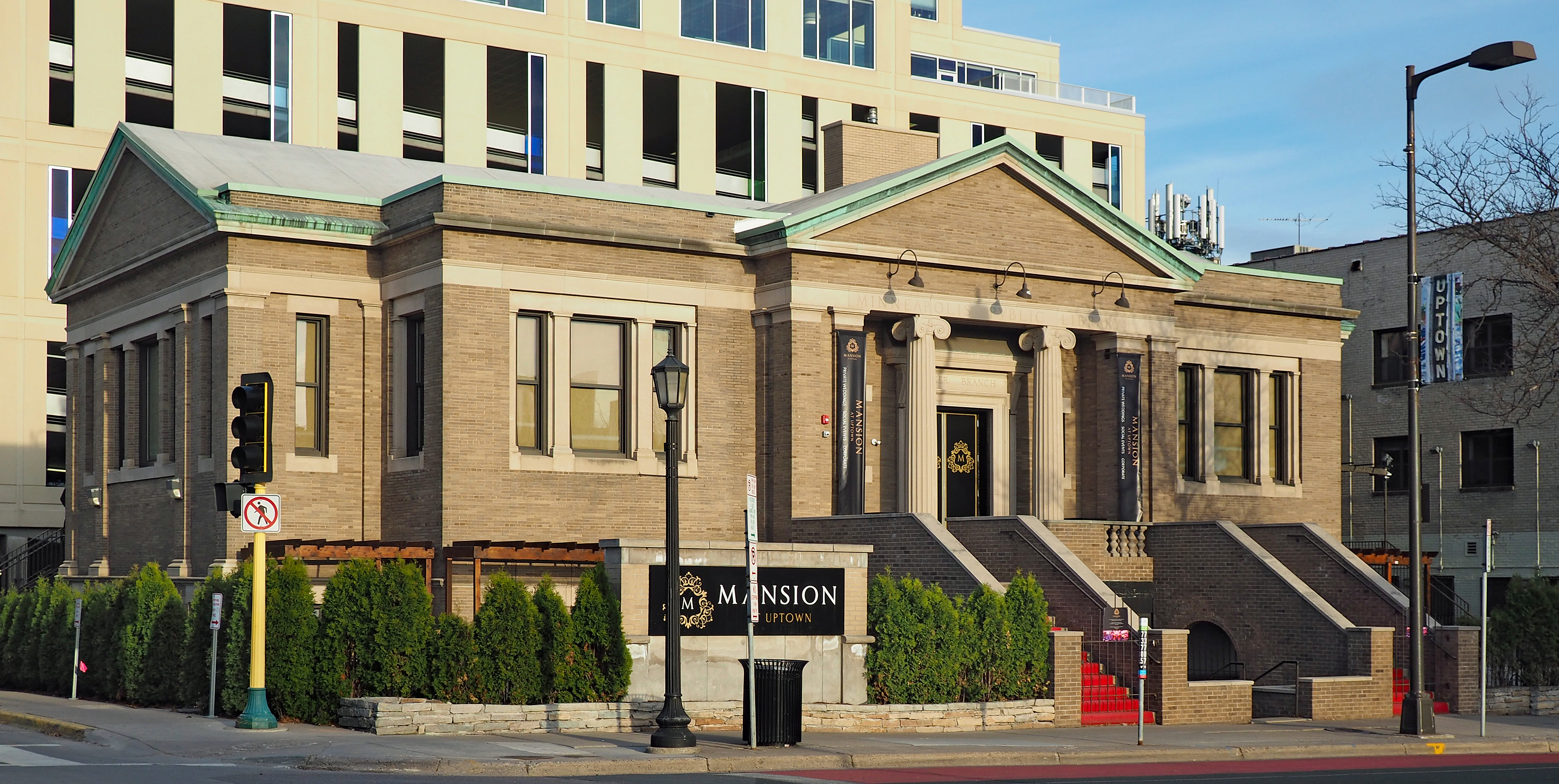
- The old library building on the east side of Hennepin Avenue

- Location within Minnesota Location within the United States
- Location: Minneapolis, Minnesota
- Coordinates: 44°56′59″N 93°17′52″W
- Built: 1911
- Architect: Jackson, Jerome Paul; Elliott, J. & W.A.
- Architectural style: Classical Revival
- NRHP reference No.: 00000544

Significant dates
- Added to NRHP: May 26, 2000
- Designated MPLSL: 1997

Walker Library is a public library in the East Isles neighborhood of Minneapolis, Minnesota, United States. It is on Hennepin Avenue one block north of Lake Street, adjoining the Midtown Greenway.

Walker and the 14 other libraries of Minneapolis Public Library were merged into the combined urban/suburban Hennepin County Library in 2008.

== Original 1911 building ==
The original building was built in 1911, when the Hennepin/Lake area was sparsely populated. T. B. Walker, the president of the library board at the time, donated some land for the site of the library. The opening of this library coincided with the opening of a streetcar line on Lake Street, and it helped fulfill head librarian Gratia Countryman's wishes to expand the library system and bring books closer to people. Local architect Jerome Paul Jackson designed the library in a Classical Revival design. The portico, with Ionic columns, shows Beaux-Arts characteristics.

Thomas Barlow Walker was involved in many aspects of Minneapolis art and culture. He was a member of the Minneapolis Athenaeum, the first lending library in Minneapolis, established in 1859. He led the progressive wing of Athenaeum members in advocating for a Public Library, established in 1885 with the main library opening in 1889.

In the 1870s Walker began collecting paintings and other works of art for his house on 8th and Hennepin Ave. In 1879 Walker built a gallery between his residence and his carriage house to display 20 paintings. This was the first public gallery in the Midwest. He collected landscapes, portraits, historical paintings and bronzes, miniatures, classical and Asian art. By 1892 Walker opened three more gallery rooms and also was contributing art to the public library's art gallery its location at 10th and Hennepin Ave.

In 1908 the Lyndale branch of the Minneapolis Public Library, was created. Thomas B. Walker wrote in the Minneapolis Public Library Board 1910 annual report that the city needed more branch libraries and reading rooms not only to provide a path for citizenship and education but, “To offset these temptations and demoralizing influences which to an ever-increasing extent afflict society.” In an effort to compete with the city's saloons, the Walker Branch was first envisioned in 1909, when Minneapolis Library Board member Thomas B. Walker donated two lots at 29th and Hennepin worth $42,700 to the Library Board. In 1910 Paul Jerome Jackson was selected as the project's architect. The Library's Building Committee also determined the two lots were not a sufficient of amount of land to build a branch library and Mr. Walker donated an additional 30 feet along Hennepin Avenue.

On June 13, 1911, the Walker Branch Library celebrated its grand opening. The first librarian was Lucy C. Dinsmore, who served from 1911 to 1925. By 1912 Walker's residence, art gallery and offices took up one-fourth of the block at 8th and Hennepin. Walker later moved his family and his art to the Thomas Lowry Mansion on Lowry Hill in 1916. In 1920 Walker's compound on 8th and Hennepin was torn down to make way for the State Theater. In the meantime the bulk of the collection was housed at the Minneapolis Public Library while Walker offered to donate land and his collection for a new library and art museum. The proposal was first accepted and then ultimately rejected by the city. Instead, Walker Art Center was built in the location that Walker and library director Gratia Countryman wanted a new main library. Minneapolis did not get a new main library until 35 years later when the new Minneapolis Central Library was opened at 300 Nicollet Mall in 1960.

A city of Minneapolis report written soon after the Walker Library opened noted that West High School and three other schools were in “borrowers’ distance” but about half of the circulation was adult fiction.

On October 1, 1925, Lucy C. Dinsmore resigned, she was replaced by Alta I. Hansen who had previously worked at the Business Branch.

In 1926 the Lyndale branch and a deposit collection were merged to form the West Lake Branch at Pillsbury and Lyndale.

On October 4, 1928, Alta Hansen transferred back to business branch, she was replaced by Marion Crosby who had previously been librarian at East Lake Library.

Starting in May 1937 the Minnesota Mycological society had its regular meetings for the study of mushrooms at the Walker Library. The Minnesota Audubon Society also had regular meetings and film and slide programs at the library. The Audubon Society also had a display of birds in the basement Audubon room until 1959 when the birds were donated to the city school's science departments. In the late 1930s the library had some WPA workers to help with day-to-day operations. Dexter Goulston, a labor organizer and auxiliary member of Truck Driver's Local #544 attempted to get WPA and Library staff to rebel against management but Marion Crosby was so universally respected that his words fell on deaf ears and he was quite discouraged and was transferred. Crosby was a bit concerned that she may have done something to get the library involved with the very active truck drivers union but everything ended up working out for the best.

Another WPA worker, Patricia Cannon, received rave reviews from Crosby during her time there but afterwards, in 1938, Cannon was arrested for forging withdrawals from the library account assigned to Crosby. There were also many other WPA workers that did excellent work and provided great service to library patrons.

On September 14, 1939, Father Ryan of St. Stephen's parish requested permission to use the meeting space at Walker Library for the purpose of weekday classes in religious instruction. Library director Carl Vitz informed the Library Board that under current library rules, meeting facilities cannot be used for religious or political meetings. The Library Board voted to change the rule allowing this type of use but only under strict conditions. In September 1940 the café at the Carling Hotel, the Library's neighbor was raided for selling hard liquor (it only had a license for beer). Marion Crosby hoped, “if they fold up and fade from the scene we shall not have so many bottles to clear off our lawn in the mornings.”

In June 1942 Marion Phillips was appointed head librarian of Walker Library. Because of its close proximity to Walker Library, the West Lake Branch is closed in 1946 when it loses its lease.

In 1948 the Teen-Age Book Club was formed by teens in the Walker Library area, it met on Thursday mornings in the summer. Donna TerLouw, aged 14 was the president. The girls read books such as Roommates by Laura Cooper Rendenna, Seventeenth Summer by Maureen Daly and One Crowded Hour by Jenane Patterson Binder. The boys liked books such as All-Conference Tackle by C. Paul Jackson and Touchdown Twins by Phillip Harkins. Both boys and girls enjoyed Dostoevsky's Crime and Punishment and Sinclair Lewis’ Kingsblood Royal. It was the second teen book club in the city, Sumner Library formed a group a few years earlier.

Head librarian Mary Cracraft on October 26, 1953, noted feeling the effect of moving pictures in calls for The Robe, From Here to Eternity, Moulin Rouge, Shane and The Moon is Blue. On June 11, 1954, the reference load was noted and some of the unique requests: they helped a woman find something inspirational to write on a first wedding anniversary to her daughter and husband living in Spain; they got a frantic call from someone wondering approximately how much 13 pounds of pennies was worth.

On March 14, 1958, the Audubon Society gave a movie projector to the library. The population of the area served by the Walker library was about 26,000 in 1960: 21,000 adults and 5,000 children.

Walker Library heated up in the summer days, especially in August. After the new Central Library opened, Mary Cracraft noted on August 5, 1963, “I have never heard so many people say, as have this month that they have gone to the Main Library more, and I can’t blame them. Our little bailiwick has been damned hot compared with the wonderful air conditioning of Main.”

A plan emerged in 1968 to replace the Walker Library with a 15,000 square foot building at Humboldt Avenue South and Lake Street, it did not come to fruition. In 1971 Library Director Ervin Gaines wrote to the Lowry Hill Homeowner's Association, “We have been endeavoring for the last several years to persuade the city fathers that the Walker Library at 29th and Hennepin is too small and outmoded for the space age and for the desires of the neighborhood. So far, we have not been successful…Lowry Hill residents, once persuaded to take action, will be a compelling force to bring to reality our dream of a new library to replace the old and honored Walker Library that has served so well, but has grown obsolete.”

A 1973 Wedge article pointed towards the new Southdale library as a model for a new community oriented library for the Uptown neighborhood that would have a more dynamic role in the educational and information needs of the surrounding community.

In 1974 the Minneapolis Park Board denied the library the land across from the present library for a new library; it would have been at the end of the Mall. The library was also looking at the Calhoun School at 3016 Girard as a possible site.

By 1976 a joint library/park recreation center and new gym for West High School was floated. West High did later get a new gym, which became the YWCA when West was demolished. The Minneapolis Park Board rejected the joint use idea. The Minneapolis Library Board chose 2880 Hennepin as the site for the new Walker Library.

In October 1978 the land was purchased for the new Walker Library at Lagoon and Hennepin. The cost was $310,600.

The new Walker Community Library, 2880 Hennepin Avenue South opened in 1981, which was built out of concrete and earth at a cost of $2.3 million. It was designed by Myers & Bennett and built by George F. Cook Construction. The old library closed on February 7, 1981, and the new library opened on February 23. 1981. The library board sold old Walker Library to Laurence S. Zipkin for $400,000 in October 1980.

In 1985 a casual restaurant, “Walker’s” opened in the basement of the old library. Gourmet hamburgers were the signature fare.

In 1993 the Junior League bought the building and opened a used clothing store inside, called “The Clothesline.”

In October 2003 a posh spa and salon named Pagoda moved into the old library.

The building was sold in January 2015 to Ned Abdul, and is currently home to a reception venue called Mansion at Uptown that opened in 2016.

== 1981 building ==
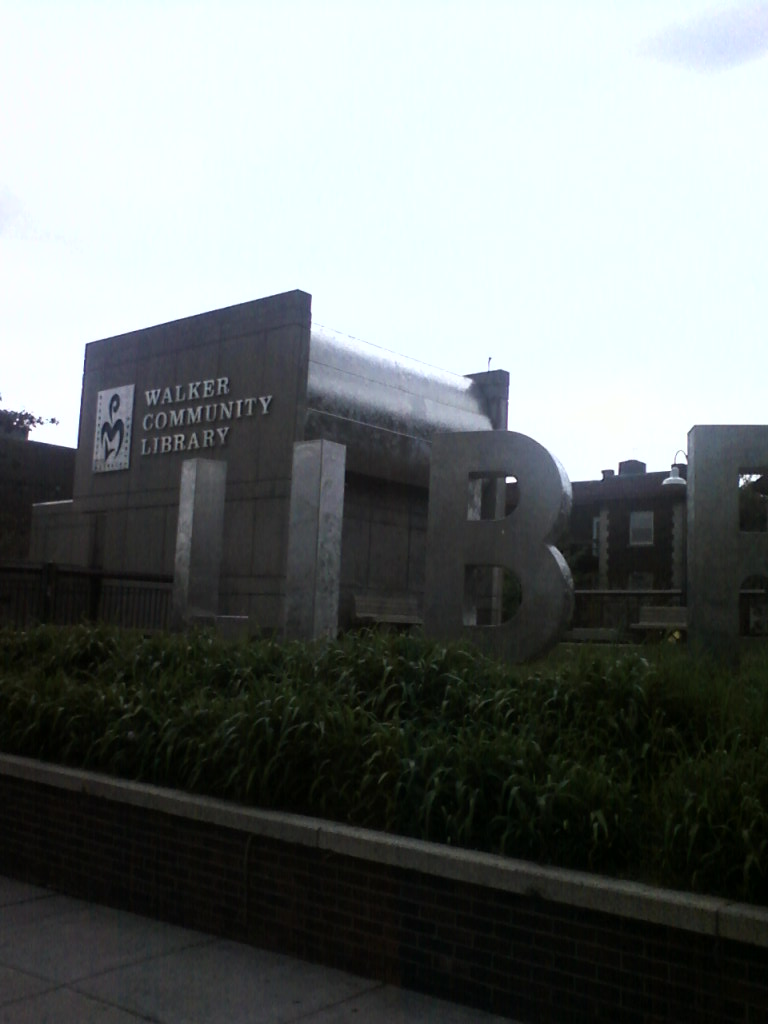
Exterior of the 1981 building

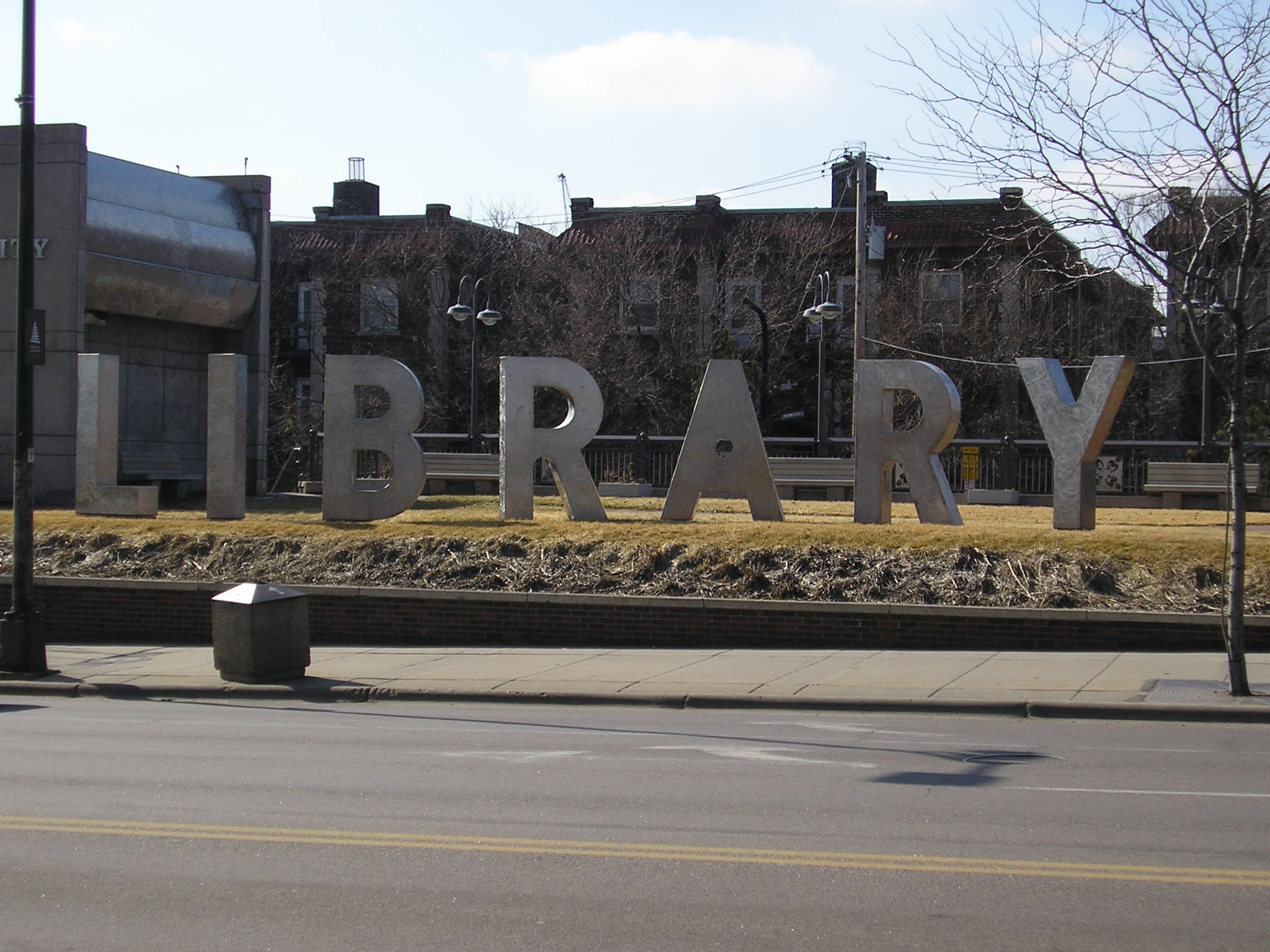
Iconic letters outside of building

In the 1970s, the Walker Library at 2901 Hennepin Avenue was deemed “not to meet the standards of a modern facility…with many exterior steps and the interior is crowded.” It was replaced by the Walker Community Library, across the street at 2880 Hennepin Avenue South, in 1981, which was built out of concrete and earth at a cost of $2.3 million. It was designed by Myers & Bennett and built by George F. Cook Construction. The interior designer was Kalbac and Associates. It was the first earth-sheltered building constructed by the City of Minneapolis and one of the few underground public libraries in the country. It measured 18,500 square feet and had a 36 car metered parking lot. An article written by the East Calhoun News in April 1982 noted that the new Library was too busy to note its anniversary. Circulation at the library jumped 77% from 1980 to 1981. Walker Library moved from fifth place in circulation out of the 14 community libraries to second, ranking only behind Washburn Library.

The two main floors of the new building were located underground. There was a large "LIBRARY" sign on Hennepin Avenue with an entry pavilion to indicate the library's presence. A unique feature of this building was its book return. Books could be dropped off from a chute at the top of the building and would slide down a long spiraling metal playground slide to the bottom floor.

Although the building was built underground to conserve space and save energy, it was not easily visible and had problems with water seepage.

By 1993, several deficiencies in lighting, space, identity, water leakage and accessibility were noted for the building. When it was constructed, underground building technology was new and untested. Although built to conserve energy, many times these buildings ended up being expensive to maintain. The Walker Library was no exception. What was revolutionary in 1981 was considered ugly and prone to vandalism in 1993. By 1994, many in the neighborhood wanted to move back to the old library building instead of paying $900,000 in renovations for the new one. The renovation was still much cheaper compared to the estimated $5.4 million required to update the old Walker Building which had just been bought by the Junior League.

In 1995, renovations were done to address structural issues and make the library more inviting. Seven-foot-high brushed stainless steel block letters spelling out L-I-B-R-A-R-Y, designed by Leonard Park Associates Architects, were added to the exterior and an original mural of Cinderella based upon Beatrix Potter's characters added charm to the children's area. After initial rejection, a renovated parking deck was approved and undertaken to eliminate the cracks and leaks in the roof. A mixed-use library/apartment building was also proposed but a task force decided not to move forward with a building that could possibly cost $6.5 million.

In 2001, a children's book written by Susan Goldman Rubin titled There Goes the Neighborhood: Ten Buildings People Loved to Hate included chapters on the Eiffel Tower, the Guggenheim Museum and the Walker Library.

More renovations were done to the parking deck in 2005. By 2006, proposals were being considered to replace the library with something that would be more visible. The building was razed in 2013 to make way for a new above-ground library.

== 2014 building ==
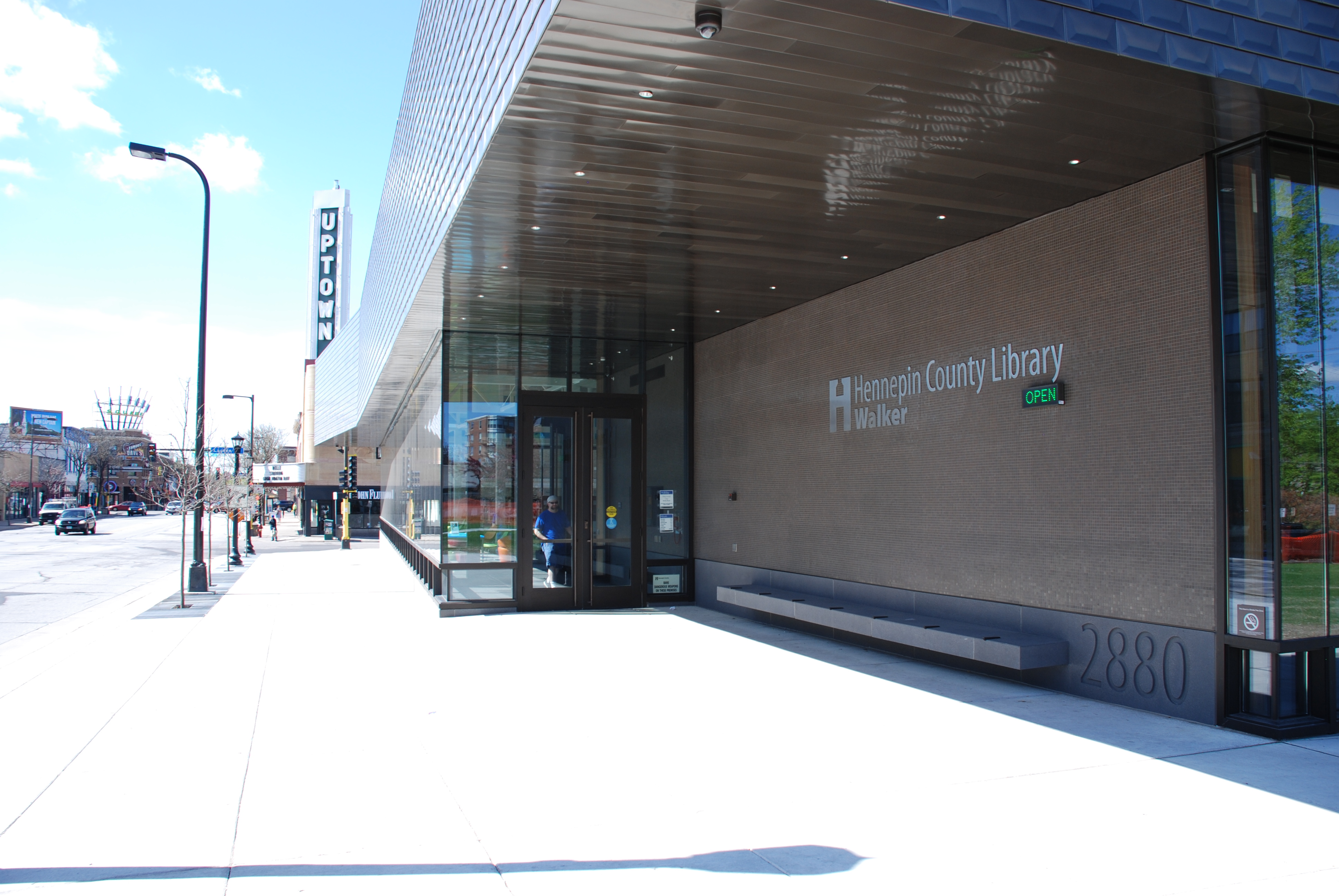
Walker Library, 2014

The 1981 building closed on September 22, 2012, and was replaced with a new building designed by VJAA and built by Shaw-Lundquist and Associates. It opened on April 26, 2014. In the new, above-ground building, visitors enter through the front door into a vestibule, and then into a large high-ceilinged main room, containing the front desk, rows of computers, self checkout stations, and is where the majority of the books and DVDs are kept. Below the building is a new underground parking garage. Behind the building, in an alley dipping into the ground to allow access to the parking garage, the stainless steel block letters from the front of the 1981 building were placed on the ledge on top of the alley.
