= Webber Park Library =

Coordinates: 45.031823°N 93.288517°W

Webber Park Library is a public library in Minneapolis, Minnesota, United States. Its primary service area is the Camden, Minneapolis community. The library was one of thirteen branch libraries established under the leadership of Gratia Countryman, the chief librarian of the Minneapolis Public Library from 1904 to 1936. After starting as a delivery station in a drugstore and being housed in two buildings within Webber Park, it was in temporary quarters in a shopping center from 2014 to 2017. The current building opened in May 2017 on the site of the previous buildings.

== Delivery Station E, Camden Place, 1895–1910 ==
The minutes of the Minneapolis Library Board from May 6, 1895, noted that the residents of Camden Place had petitions for a library station in their area. The Camden Place library station was approved by the Minneapolis Library Board at the July 1, 1895 meeting. The 1895 Annual Report noted that Delivery Station E, Camden Place opened in September 1895 and was housed in Coffin's Drug Store. William A. Coffin was a druggist and the postmaster for Camden Place. His store was located at 4169 Washington Avenue North, between 41st and 42nd Avenues N. From 1897 to 1900, store ownership was taken over by Leslie A.Hanes. After 1900, the store was owned by Nels A. Winslow.

Despite a call to temporarily suspend the station in 1905, it remained active until a permanent library was created in 1910.

== Camden Library, 1910–1954 ==
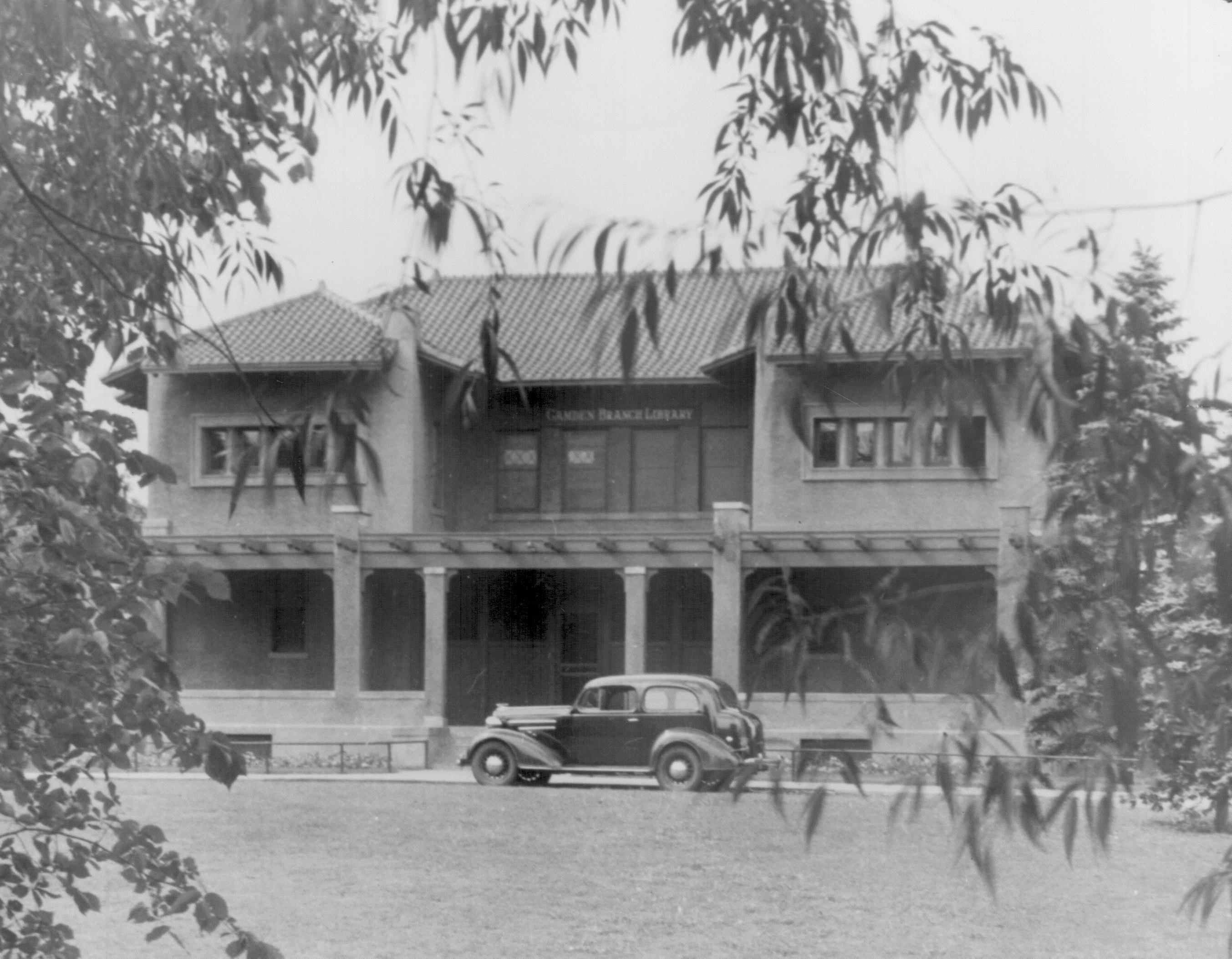
Camden Branch Library was housed in the John D. Webber Memorial Fieldhouse from 1910 to 1954. It was renamed Webber Park Library in 1954 and razed for a new library building in 1979.

The Webber Park field house was built in 1910 and the newly created Camden Branch of Minneapolis Public Library was housed in the second floor. The Camden Library was part of a larger park project spearheaded by Charles C. and Mary Webber, who donated the funds for the library in memory of their son John Deere Webber, the great-grandson of tractor and farm implement magnet John Deere. The park was named Camden Park from when it was first planned in 1908 until 1939 when it was renamed after the Webbers. This library was created in the effort by library director Gratia Countryman to have libraries created throughout the city of Minneapolis. By the 1930s the population of the Camden community had grown to the point that more space was needed.

== Webber Park Library, 1954–present ==
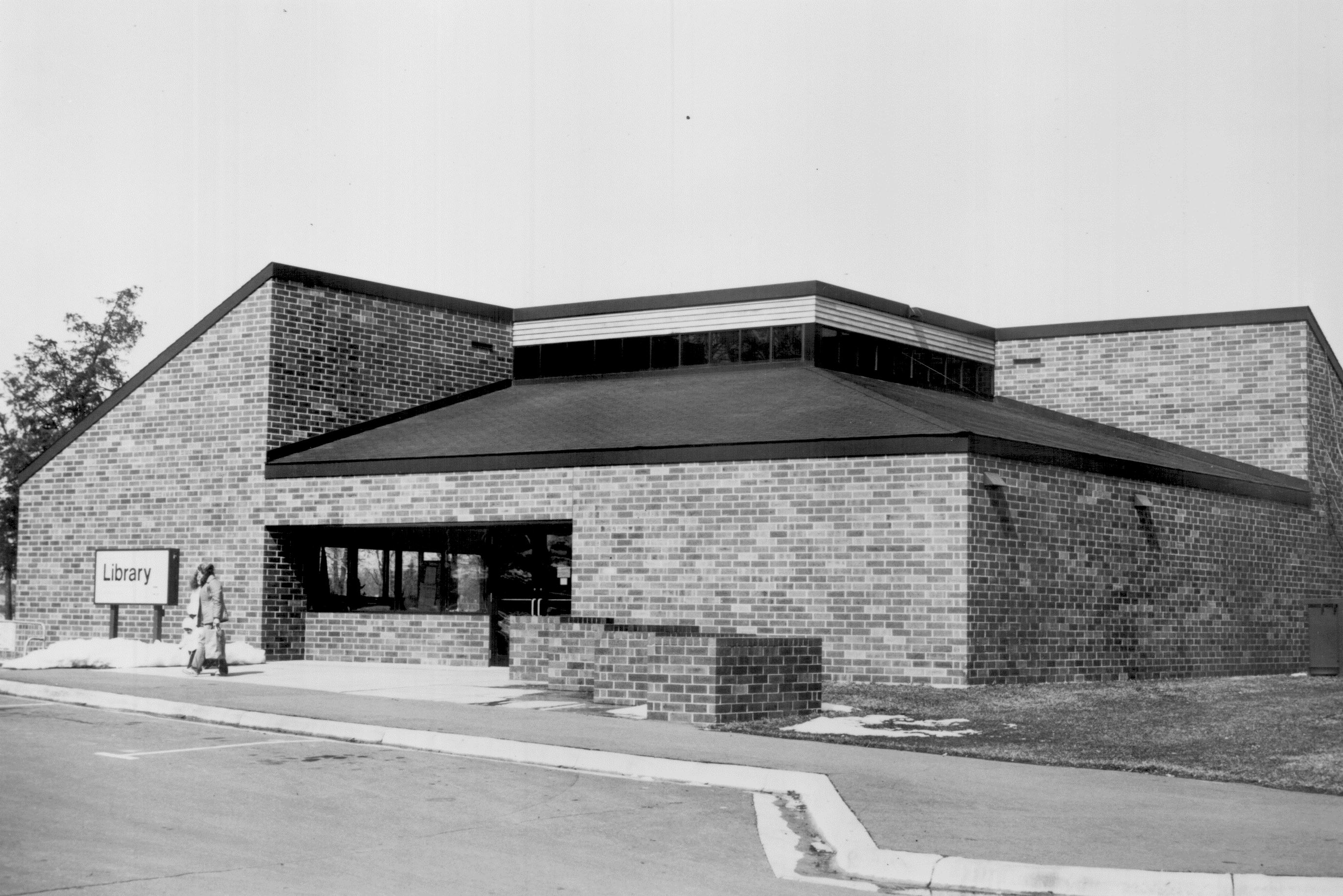
Webber Park Library was built in 1980 and served the Camden community of Minneapolis until 2013 when it was razed due to structural failure.

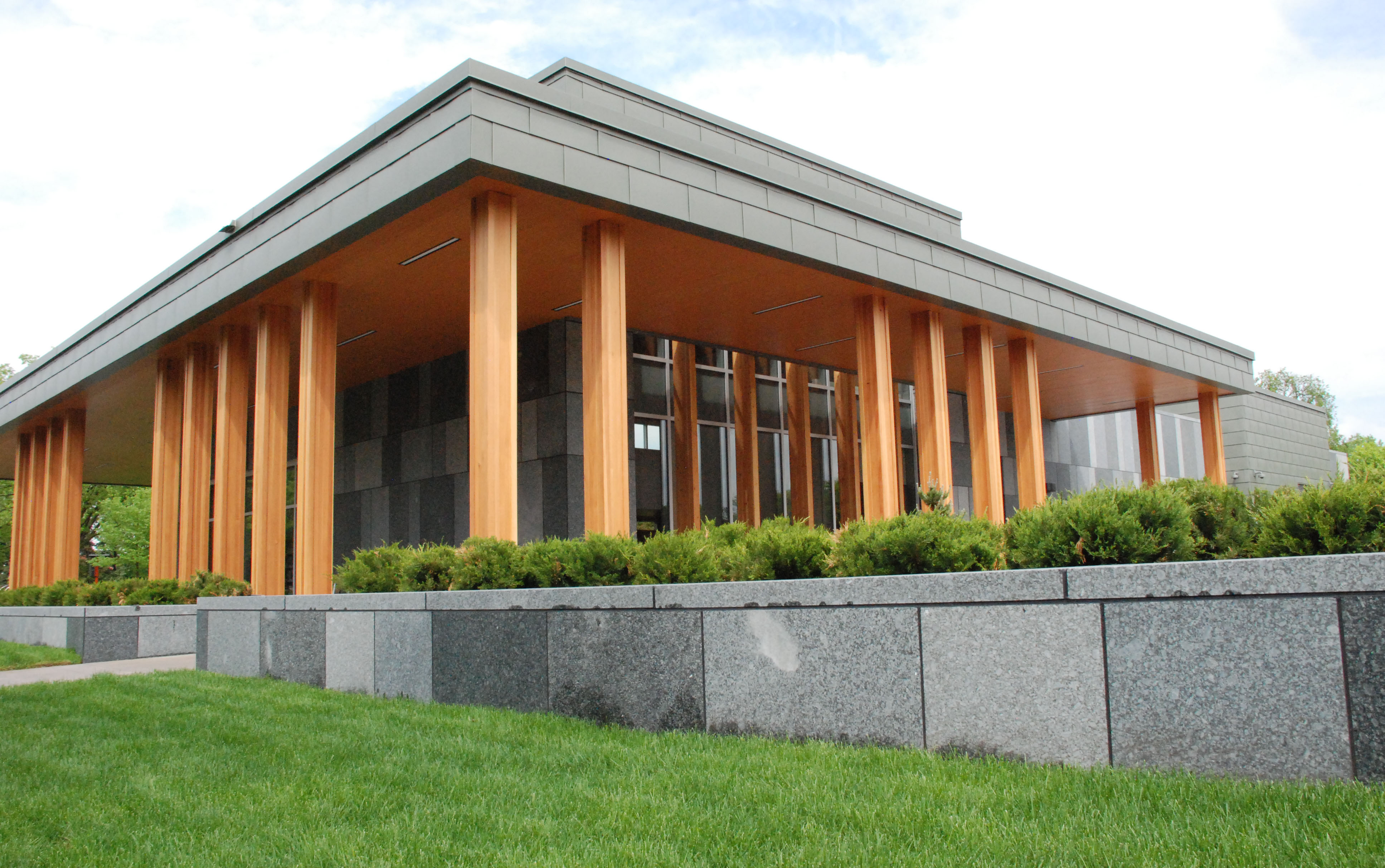
This new building opened on May 18, 2017

In 1954 the library acquired the rest of the building from the Minneapolis Park Board and renamed it Webber Park Library. In 1979 the field house was razed to make way for a new swimming pool and a new Webber Park Library was built in 1980.

Webber Park and 14 other libraries of Minneapolis Public Library were merged into the combined urban/suburban Hennepin County Library in 2008.

The 1980 structure began to fail in 2013 and was closed and razed. A temporary location opened in December 2013 at Camden Center, 4203 Webber Parkway. A new library building was built with a building project process of community engagement. The temporary location closed on April 29 and the new location on 4440 Humboldt Ave. N. opened on May 18, 2017.

The new library on Humboldt has an exterior includes a veneer of Lake Superior green granite, echoing the composition of the Victory Memorial Parkway sign that is nearby. Other materials include zinc panels and Douglas fir wood columns that support the porch canopies. Inside, wood-finish ceilings, granite accents and fir structural columns echo the look and feel of outdoor spaces, as well. Window walls bring natural light into the indoor spaces. The library's early literacy play space for the youngest readers also works to bring the outside in. Children can pretend they are at a ranger station, a veterinary office or anywhere their imaginations take them. Providing inviting indoor and outdoor reading and gathering spaces, the building has a wraparound porch, facing Humboldt Avenue North, which echoes the fronts of the homes in the neighborhood. The new library has twice the space of the 1980 structure and open hours increase from 3 to 6 days a week.
