= Sumner Library =

- Sumner Branch Library
- U.S. National Register of Historic Places
- Minneapolis Landmark
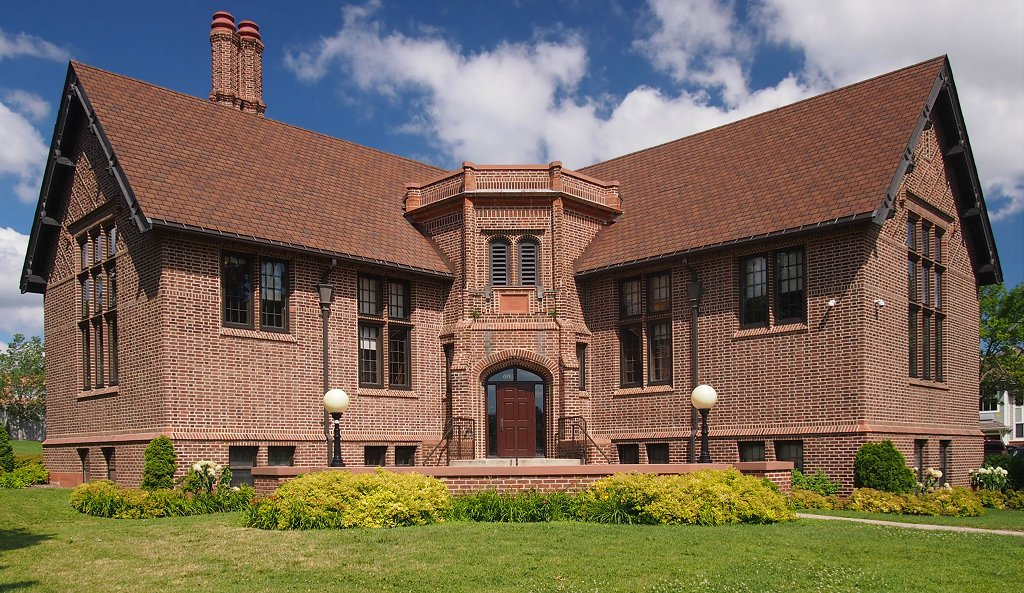
- Sumner Library from the southeast

- Location within Minnesota Location within the United States
- Location: 611 Van White Memorial Boulevard, Minneapolis, Minnesota
- Coordinates: 44°59′05″N 93°17′40″W
- Built: 1915
- Architect: Cecil Bayless Chapman, Haglin, & Stahr
- Architectural style: Tudor Revival
- NRHP reference No.: 00000539

Significant dates
- Added to NRHP: May 26, 2000
- Designated MPLSL: 1997

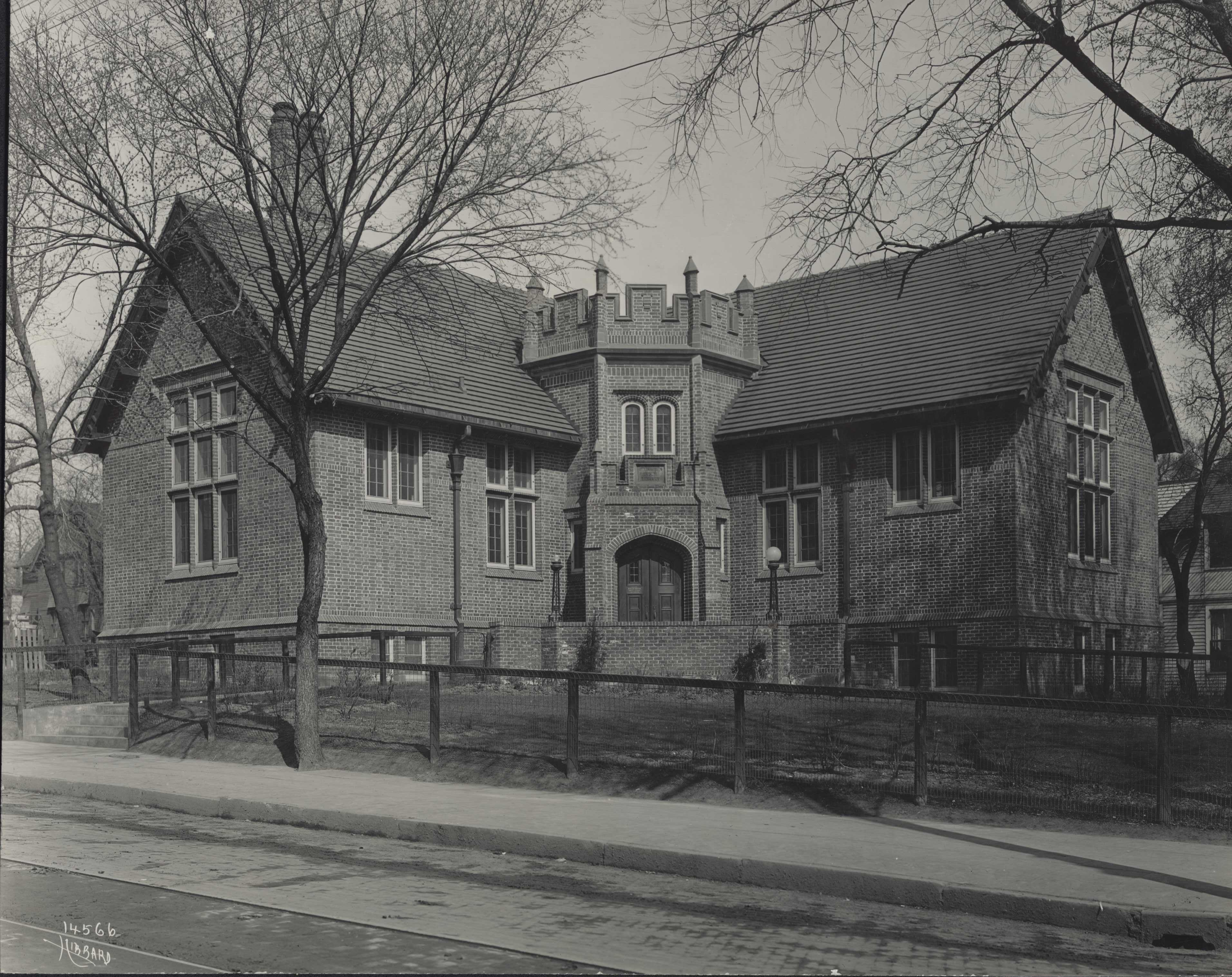
Image of the library before it was moved in the 1930s.

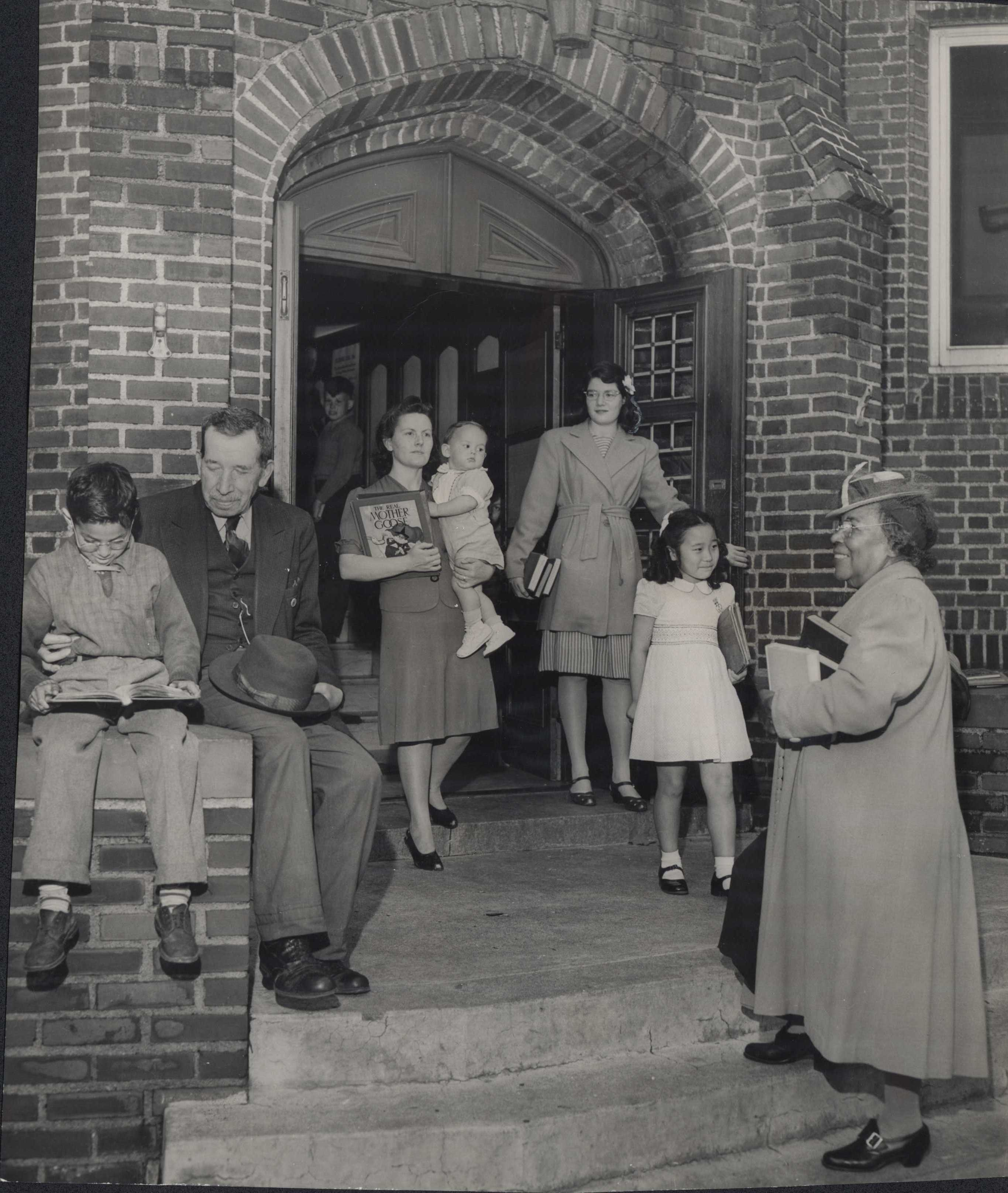
The variety of patrons is evident in this 1943 photo of Sumner Library's entrance.

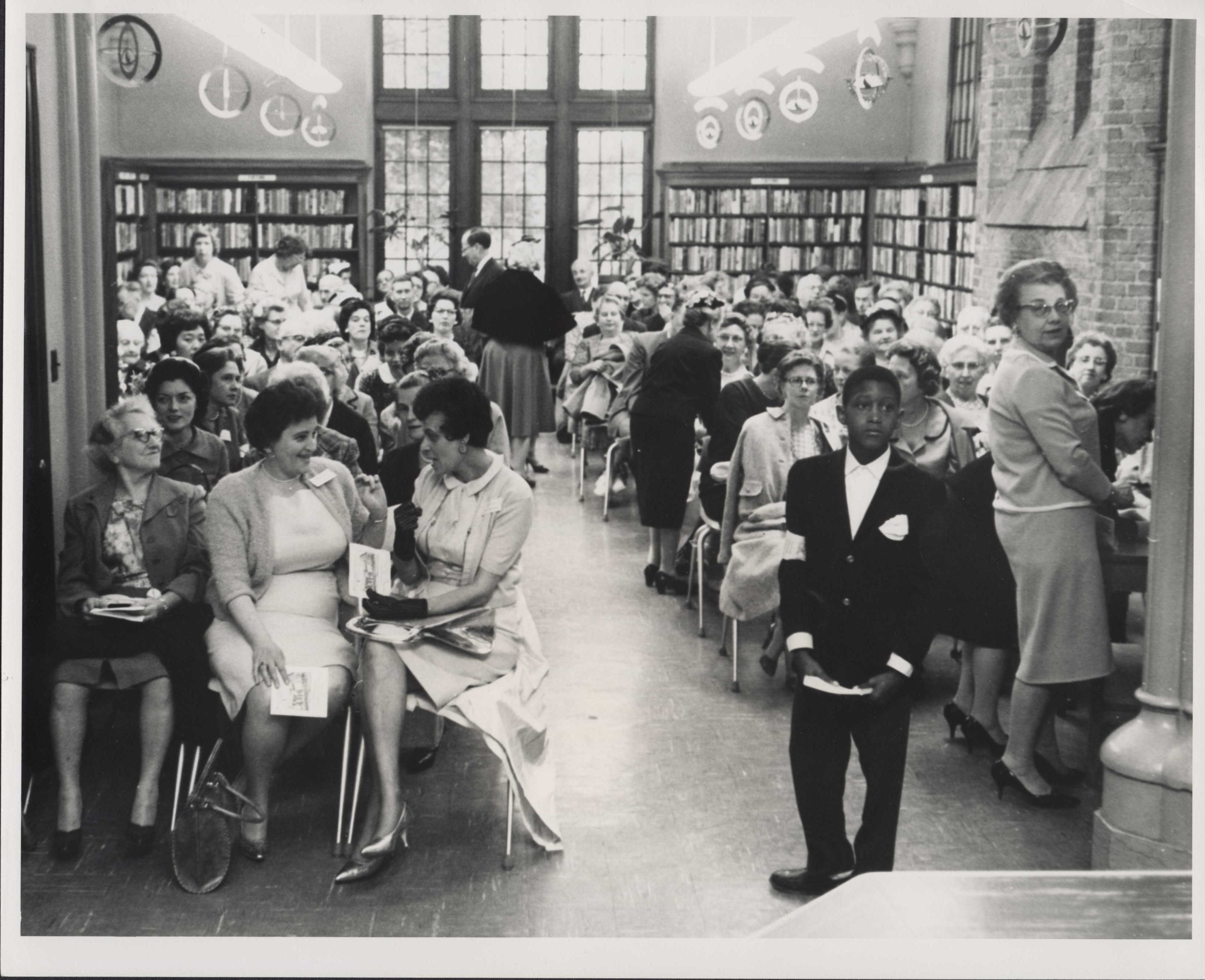
Sumner Library 50th Anniversary celebration.

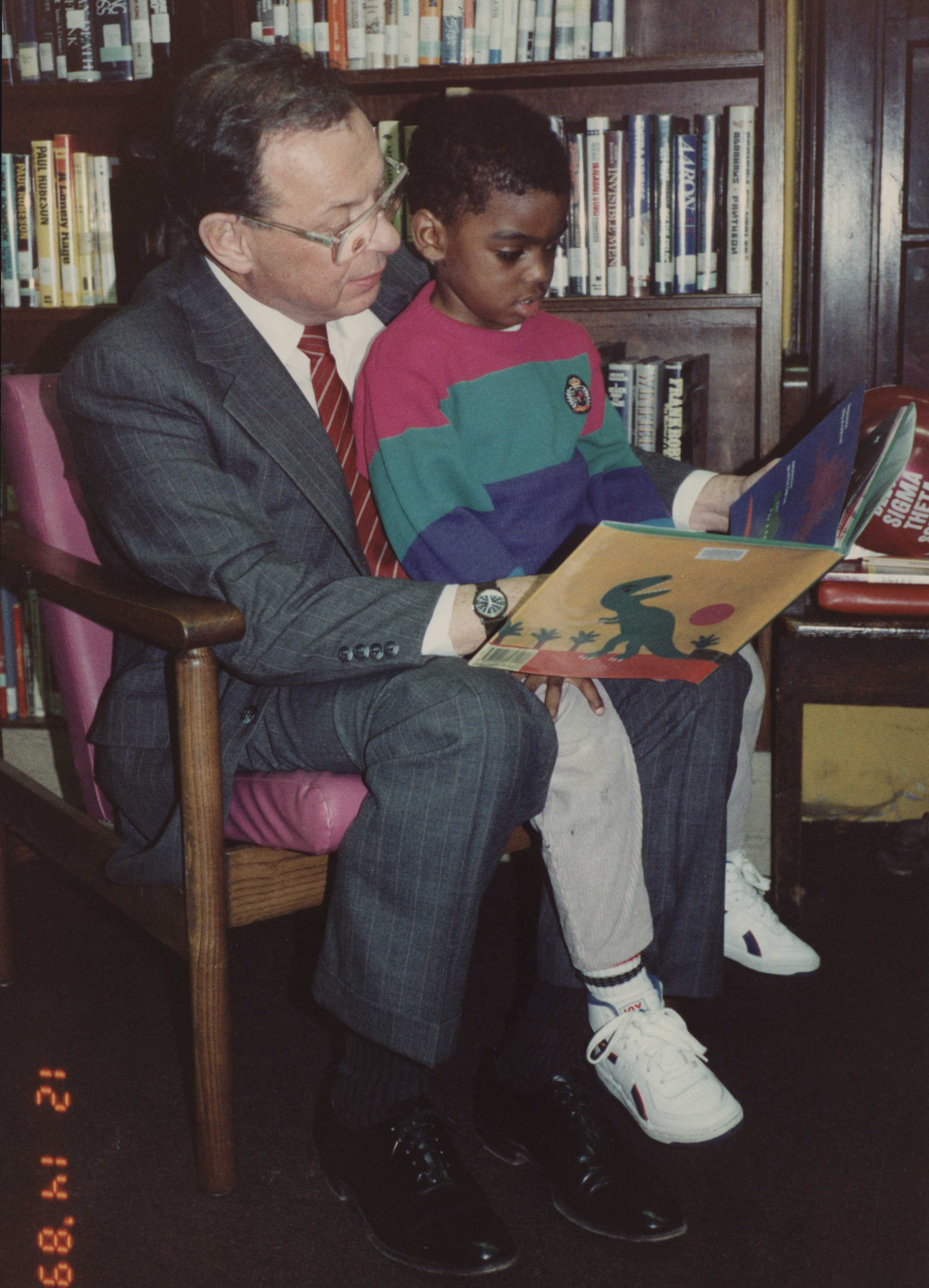
Minneapolis mayor Donald M. Fraser & Jesse Ross Jr. (age 7), 1989.

Sumner Library is a public library located in the Near North neighborhood of Minneapolis, Minnesota. Established in 1915 and named after Charles Sumner, a U.S. Senator from Massachusetts known for his strong stance against slavery, it was the second of the four Carnegie libraries built in Minneapolis.

In the early 20th century, the Sumner Library served as a haven for Jewish immigrants. In response to a survey indicating that 95% of the library's patrons were Jewish immigrants, the Minneapolis Public Library moved its entire collection of Yiddish and Hebrew works to the Sumner Library branch. Over the decades, its focus shifted to meet the needs of arriving Scandinavian, Russian, Black American, Southeast Asian, and East African residents as the neighborhood's demographics changed. Many patrons learned English there and participated in social clubs held in the building.

The Tudor Revival building is listed on the National Register of Historic Places. In 2008, Sumner and the 14 other libraries of the Minneapolis Public Library were merged into the combined urban/suburban Hennepin County Library system. The Sumner Library celebrated its 100th anniversary on October 10, 2015.

== Establishment and Carnegie grant ==
Sumner Library opened on June 5, 1912, in a rented store room at 901 6th Ave. N in Minneapolis. Young people flocked to the library for reading materials, and many adults used the library's collection of juvenile materials to learn English. Approximately 90% of the library's patrons were Jewish immigrants. From the outset, reading materials in Russian, Yiddish, and Hebrew were in high demand, and the foreign language collection was entirely "read out" by 1913.

Just a few months prior to the library's opening in rented quarters, the Minneapolis Public Library received notice that the Carnegie Corporation was offering them $125,000 to erect four branch libraries. Gratia Countryman, Head Librarian of the Minneapolis Public Library, had worked tirelessly to secure the grant. Countryman believed that extension services would enable the library to reach as many people as possible, and the branch libraries were a key component of extension work in the Minneapolis Public Library system.

Sumner is one of the three remaining Carnegie library branches remaining in Minneapolis, with the others being the Franklin and the Hosmer libraries. Minneapolis architect Cecil Bayless Chapman designed the library in the Tudor Revival style. The brick L-shaped library featured arched ceilings and a central tower where the main entrance and librarian's office were. Sumner Library's new building officially opened on December 16, 1915, at 6th Ave. N and Emerson. After being open just one month, the new building was already too small. Staff reported that one-third of the children who came to the library could not find a place to sit, and adults were crowded out of the library altogether.

== The library's diverse community ==
Throughout the entirety of its existence, Sumner Library has been a mainstay among services helping immigrants adapt to life in the United States. Almost as soon as the building opened, Sumner Library hosted English and citizenship courses. Since many adults in the neighborhood did not speak English, library staff would ask children, who often did speak English, to tell their parents about the classes. Neighborhood residents affectionately refer to the Sumner Library as "our university," as it has provided a welcoming space for education and social interaction. It served various populations over the decades as demographics changed. Today, the library continues to offer assistance to people earning their GED, learning English and studying for their citizenship exam through tutoring and classes offered by the Open Door Learning Center.

Sumner Library has served a wide variety of ethnic and religious groups since its establishment in North Minneapolis. Initially, the population that lived near and used Sumner Library was primarily Jewish. Adelaide Rood, Branch Librarian from 1916 to 1953, saw the library as a place that could help people of different cultural groups understand one another. In 1931, the library held its first "Jewish Book Week," displaying Jewish books and items. In the 1940s, the library decorated for Christmas and Hanukkah, creating good-will among patrons. By as early as the 1920s, however, Jewish families began moving farther north and west, out of the vicinity of the library. By 1961, the library reported that the neighborhood could no longer be thought of as a Jewish neighborhood, but an African American neighborhood, and the library's collection of Yiddish and Hebrew books was transferred to the Central Library.

The neighborhood surrounding Sumner Library has been home to African Americans since before the library was built. In the 1920s, the library established reading rooms in the Border Avenue Methodist Church and in the Phyllis Wheatley Settlement House for African Americans in order to reach more African Americans on the Northside. In the 1970s, responding to the needs of the community, Branch Librarian Grace Belton set out to identify and collect resources on Black history and literature as a means of providing access to these resources and preserving Black heritage. By 1988, this collection included 2,500 titles. In 1998, the collection was named the Gary N. Sudduth African American History and Culture Collection, after the Library Board Trustee and Urban League President Gary N. Sudduth. As of 2015, the collection contains over 5,000 titles for children, teens, and adults.

From the 1920s until the 1940s, Sumner library also served Finnish people. The library housed a collection of Finnish materials until 1954, when it was transferred to the Central Library.

In the 1980s, people from Southeast Asia began living near and using Sumner Library. By the 1990s, people from Somalia and Ethiopia lived on the Northside and began using the library as well. As of 2015, the library houses Somali, Hmong, and Spanish language collections.

== Changes to the building ==
After Sumner Library opened in 1915, inadequate space was always an issue. In 1927, a much needed addition was built on the west side of the library. The new addition housed the children's room and a workroom. In 1938, Sumner Library was moved 100 feet north to accommodate the widening of 6th Avenue. The work was done by a crew of six men, who moved the building from its original location one-eighth of an inch at a time with a large jack. Books were covered with newspaper during the move to prevent damage. Moving the library cost $32,000. At the same time the library was moved, an addition was built on the north side of the library. The addition was used as an office and a reference room. In 2004, the library was renovated once again. Additions were built on the north and west sides of the library, and the library's entrance was relocated to the north side of the building. Existing parts of the library were also restored and preserved to maintain aspects of the building's original design. Minneapolis architects, Mohammed Lawal and Peter Sussman, designed the renovations. Lawal grew up on the Northside and used Sumner Library as a child.

== Programming ==
Sumner Library has established itself as an important neighborhood community space by hosting many clubs, events, and classes over the years. Children's clubs and programming were especially popular in Sumner's early years. From the 1920s to the 1940s, troops of Boy Scouts met regularly at Sumner Library. In 1927, staff started a library club for girls. Members would mend books and magazines, shelve books, and keep the children's room organized. The library club was so popular that there was a waiting list to join the club. In 1947, the library offered a teen book club for girls. During the 1950s, films for adults were shown regularly at the library, and in the 1960s, the library showed films based on children's books.

In 1980, Branch Librarian Grace Belton recognized that literacy rates were low among adults living near Sumner Library, and a literacy class for adults was established at the library the following year. Though the class was successful and in high demand, the program ceased soon after it started due to budget cuts. Shortly after, the Minnesota Literacy Council began an adult reading program at Sumner Library which became known as the "Northside Reading Center," now known as the Open Door Learning Center. Belton also worked hard to establish literacy programs for children. She hosted storytimes, visited schools, met with parents, and spent time developing some of the library's most successful summer reading programs for kids. When Dan Kelty became Sumner's Community Librarian in 1999, the summer reading program reached capacity and 2,000 children took part in the library's Reading Club.

Today, programming at Sumner Library continues to focus on literacy, where literacy is understood as something achieved in many ways - through reading, writing, homework, conversation, and art. The library hosts regular programs for adults such as adult homework help and conversation circles for people wanting to practice speaking English. Regular programs for children include homework help, baby storytime, family storytime, and childcare group storytime. Programs such "Sing Play Learn," the Juneteenth Celebration, and genealogy research are brought to the library through Legacy funding. The Friends of Sumner Library also support programming efforts through advocacy and fundraising.

== Famous visitors ==
Sumner Library has hosted a number of famous visitors throughout its history. In 1962, Harrison Salisbury, noted author, New York Times columnist, and former patron of Sumner Library, visited and spoke at the library's 50th anniversary celebration. In 1981, poet Maya Angelou visited and gave a lecture at Sumner Library. Justice Alan Page and his wife Diane visited the library in 1984 as part of the library's "Read…By All Means" program promoting the value of reading. In 2013, American Civil Rights Movement leader James Meredith visited the library.
