= Franklin Library (Minneapolis) =

- Franklin Branch Library
- U.S. National Register of Historic Places
- Minneapolis Landmark
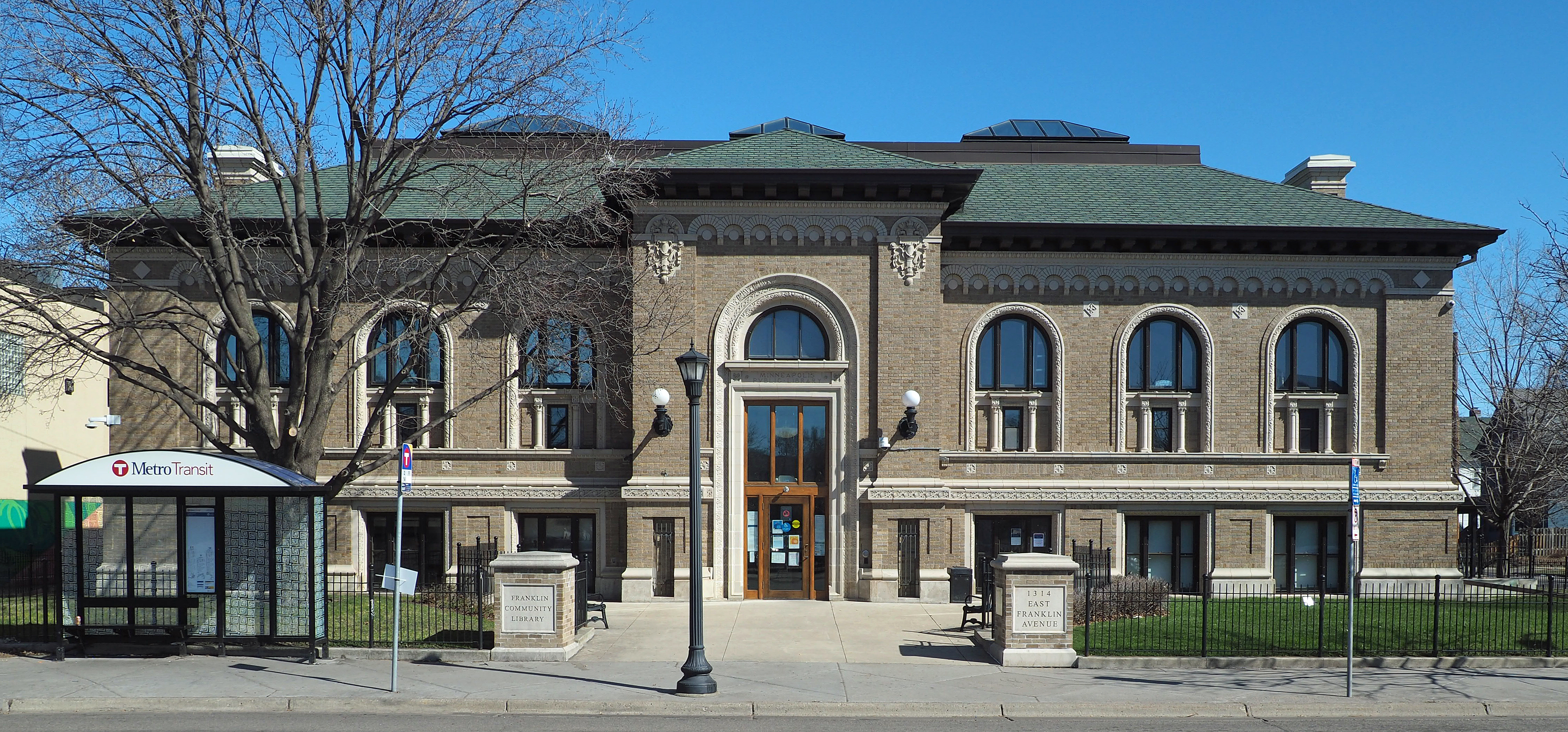
- Franklin Library viewed from the south

- Location within Minnesota Location within the United States
- Location: 1314 East Franklin Avenue, Minneapolis, Minnesota
- Coordinates: 44°57′47″N 93°15′20″W
- Built: 1914
- Architect: Edward L. Tilton; Elliott, J. & W.A.
- Architectural style: Renaissance Revival
- NRHP reference No.: 00000545

Significant dates
- Added to NRHP: May 26, 2000
- Designated MPLSL: 1997

Franklin Library is a public library on Franklin Avenue in Minneapolis, Minnesota. The library was one of thirteen branch libraries established under the leadership of Gratia Countryman, the chief librarian of the Minneapolis Public Library from 1904 to 1936. The library housed the largest collection of Scandinavian books, newspapers, and magazines within the system, which reflected the population living in the area. Opened in 1914 and designed by Edward Lippincott Tilton, a New York City architect, the Franklin Library originally served a largely Scandinavian immigrant population. It is the first of four Carnegie-funded libraries in Minneapolis and is one of only three remaining, with the others being the Sumner and Hosmer libraries. It has also been added to the National Register of Historic Places.

== South Side Branch, 1890-1914 ==
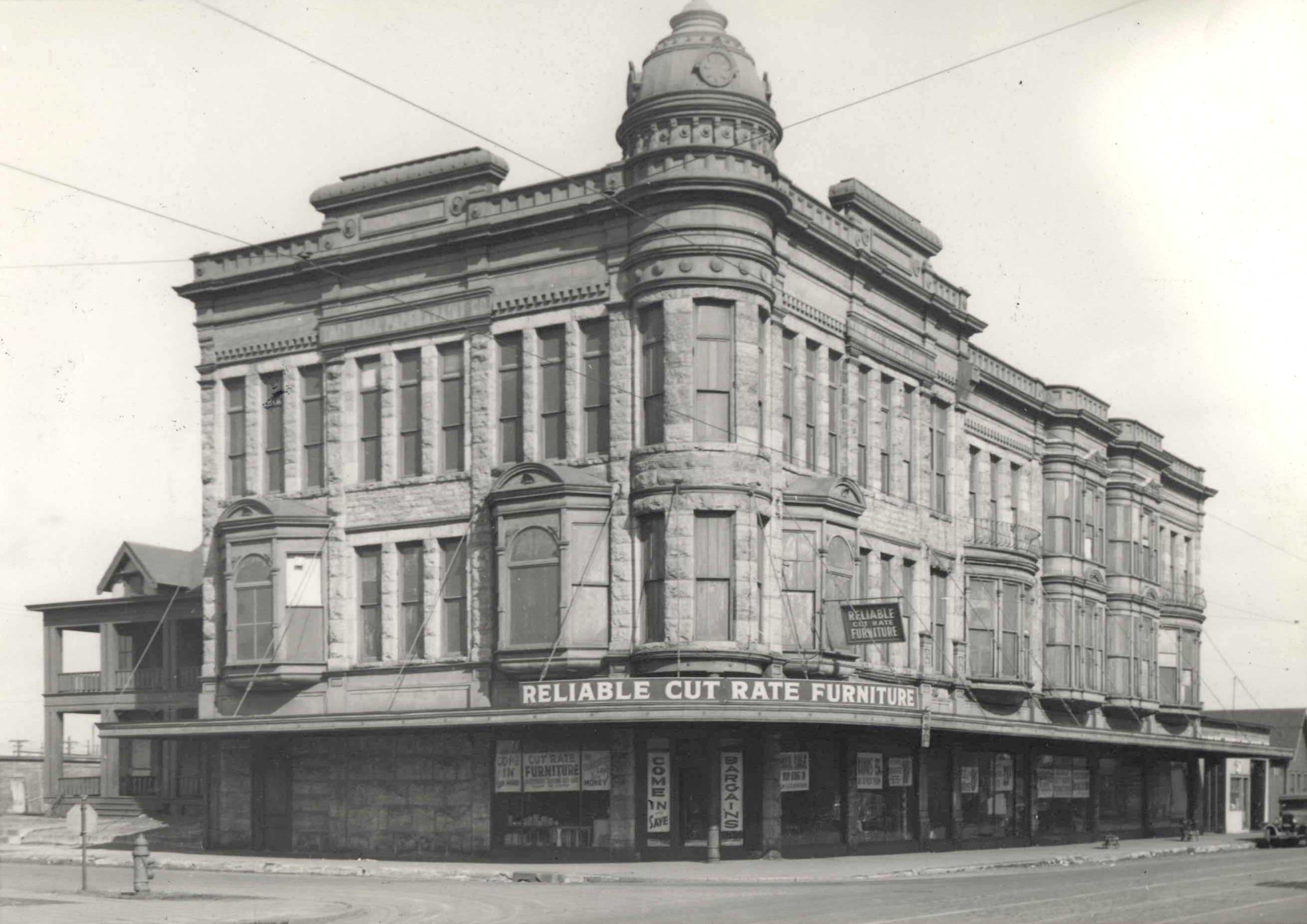
Location of South Side Branch

On April 23, 1890, the 2nd branch of the Minneapolis Public Library, the South Side branch opened. It was located in two rooms at a store at 17th Ave. and Franklin Ave. South Minneapolis was the core of the Scandinavian community and by 1904 all of the Scandinavian language materials were shelved at the South Side branch. The South Side branch was succeeded by the first Carnegie branch to open in Minneapolis, Franklin Library, in August 1914.

== Franklin Library, 1914-present ==
Under the leadership of visionary Minneapolis chief librarian Gratia Countryman, the library secured $40,000 in funding from Andrew Carnegie and the Carnegie Corporation. Built on land valued at $13,000 and donated by the McKnight family and designed by Tilton, the building opened in 1914 and quickly boasted the highest circulation numbers in the city. The two story brick building soon became one of the busiest branches in the 1920s. The Scandinavian books and magazines drew users from throughout the library. As it is central with the Somali community today, Franklin Library has always been an immigrant library.

The Phillips neighborhood near Franklin has historically been the home of Native Americans and African-Americans. The library has an American Indian collection and in the 1960s it started outreach to its neighbors, connecting them with social workers and resources.

The library is also home to the Franklin Learning Center, which was established in 1988. Franklin Learning Center serves adults who are studying English, math, science, social studies, technology and life skills, and preparing for the GED and U.S. citizenship exams. Learners work one-to-one or in small groups with instructors and volunteer tutors.

The library was listed on the National Register of Historic Places in 2000. In 2005, it was renovated to adapt to modern technology while maintaining its historic integrity.

Franklin and 14 other libraries of Minneapolis Public Library were merged into the combined urban/suburban Hennepin County Library in 2008.

== Art in the library ==
Public art at the Franklin branch includes Robert DesJarlait's Red Lake, a large mosaic above the east fireplace. Hanging in the American Indian section of the library, DesJarlait's work honors the Anishinabe Ojibwe creation myth by incorporating the seven original clans within the Ojibwe nation, the Four Orders of Life, and the star, plant and animal worlds. DesJarlait, a member of the Anishinabe Ojibwe nation, uses pictographs to tell a story within his work, honoring the traditional ways of storytelling within the Native American community. Additionally, it honors the March 2005 death of ten people on the Red Lake Reservation in northwestern Minnesota.

A mosaic by Minneapolis native Marilyn Lindstrom sits above the west fireplace. Titled World Language, the piece celebrates the globe's seven continents by including petroglyphs, pictographs and ancient symbols from each. Lindstrom collaborated with DesJarlait in the creation of his work, Red Lake.

== Demographic changes ==
Franklin librarian Cassie Warholm-Wohlenhaus's article published on November 13, 2014, provides a concise and thorough history of the Franklin library's first 100 years. Today, the collection reflects the languages spoken in the homes of the community it serves, including Arabic, Ojibwe, Oromo, Somali, and Spanish.

== Renovations ==
During the 2005 renovations to the 91-year-old building, the oldest of the three remaining Carnegie libraries in Minneapolis, the City of Minneapolis Library invested $4 million to update Franklin. Originally designed by architect Edward L. Tilton, who specialized in libraries, the structure had served the community but needed significant attention. Funding for the remodeling included monies from the City of Minneapolis Library Referendum and the City of Minneapolis's Capital Improvement Program.

During construction, the library used a building next door to provide continuity of service on a reduced capacity to patrons. This interim site's operating costs were funded by members of the community, Friends of Franklin, who worked alongside Friends of the Minneapolis Public Library, to raise over $250,000 to keep library services in the community during the remodeling. Renovation began in August 2003, and the library reopened in May 2005. Changes included restoration of an original skylight, an expanded area for children and a designated space for teens.

== Programs ==
Franklin Library offers a broad variety of programming, including the Franklin Learning Center, established in 1988.

The Franklin Teen Center supports the community's immigrant teens, helping them settle into life in Minneapolis through technology classes, academic support and instruction about life skills. Past programs have included tech workshops and a group tailored for Young Achievers. All teens can get help with homework at Franklin.

The Phillips Technology Center is a vibrant and specialized hub of learning in the neighborhood. Established in 1997, and located on the library's lower level, it provides free training for computer users and free access to technology. The center is an alliance made up of the Franklin Library, Minnesota Indian Women's Resource Center, Project for Pride in Living – Learning Center, and Waite House.
