= Charles Compton =

Charles Compton may refer to:

- Charles Compton (MP, died 1661) (c. 1624–1661), English MP for Northampton 1661–1662
- Charles Compton (MP, born 1698) (1698–1755), British MP for Northampton 1754–1755 and envoy to Portugal
- Charles Compton, 7th Earl of Northampton (1737–1763), his son, British ambassador to Venice
- Charles Compton, 1st Marquess of Northampton (1760–1828), British MP for Northampton 1784–1796, Lord Lieutenant of Northamptonshire
- Charles Douglas-Compton, 3rd Marquess of Northampton (1816–1877), born Charles Compton, British peer
- Charles H. Compton (1880–1966), American librarian and educator

== See also ==
- Chuck Compton (born 1965), American football player
