= Linden Hills Library =

- Linden Hills Branch Library
- U.S. National Register of Historic Places
- Minneapolis Landmark
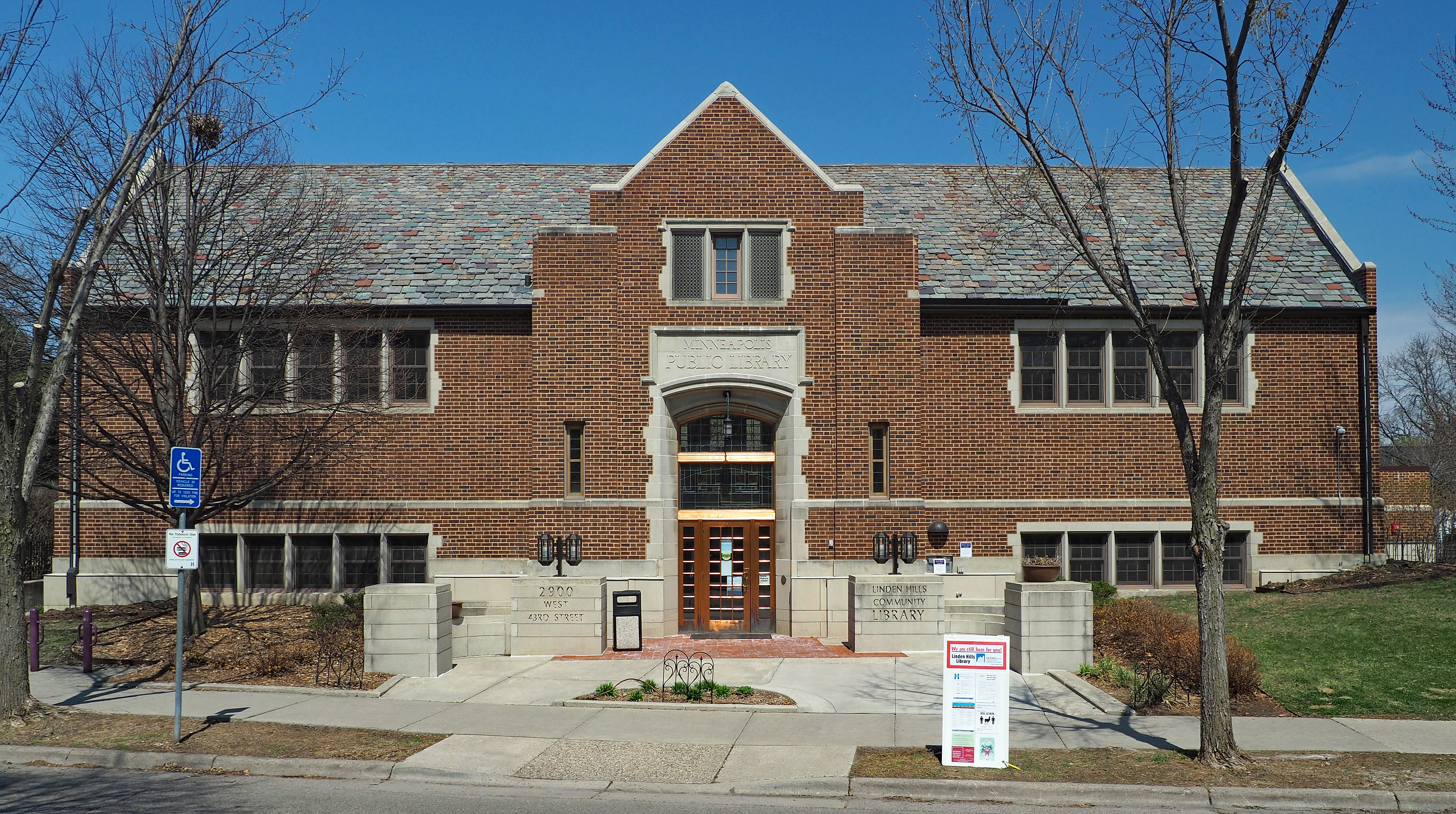
- The Linden Hills Library from the south

- Location within Minnesota Location within the United States
- Location: 2900 W. 43rd Street, Minneapolis, Minnesota
- Coordinates: 44°55′30″N 93°18′59.5″W
- Built: 1931
- Architect: Bard & Vanderbilt; Pike & Cook
- Architectural style: Tudor Revival
- NRHP reference No.: 00000540

Significant dates
- Added to NRHP: May 26, 2000
- Designated MPLSL: 1997

Linden Hills Library is a public library in the Linden Hills neighborhood of southwest Minneapolis, Minnesota, United States. The branch library originally opened in 1911 on the first floor of the Lake Harriet Commercial Club building. In 1931, under the leadership of Minneapolis Public Library's chief librarian Gratia Countryman, the library moved into its own building on 2900 West 43rd Street. Area resident Joseph Victor Vanderbilt designed the library in the Tudor Revival style. Head librarian Edith Frost served for over thirty years. The library has also hosted community groups such as children's clubs, neighborhood groups, and women's organizations. The library was listed on the National Register of Historic Places in 2000 and renovated in 2002.

The building has leaded glass windows, including a panel above the entrance that pays tribute to past generations and their legacy for the future. It also has outdoor terraces and two historic fireplaces. These features make it a favorite among neighborhood residents.

In 1911 the Linden Hills Community Library opened on the ground floor of the Lake Harriet Commercial Club Building at 2720 43rd Street West. Previously, there had been a small deposit collection housed in a neighborhood store since 1905. In October 1911 the deposit collection was moved to the first floor of the Commercial Club and the Library Board designated Linden Hills a branch library and approved the purchase of furnishings and 1,000 new books. A three-year lease was signed at $1,000 a year. In 1923 the Commercial Club raised the lease to $1,200 a year and the Library Board considered either renting or purchasing the old telephone building nearby but finally decided to stay. In March 1928 the Library Board was notified after its lease expired in the fall, the first floor space would be leased to the U.S. Post Office (which stayed until 1964).

Circulation was brisk until 1928 when the library lost its lease on the ground floor and moved upstairs. Elderly patrons had trouble getting upstairs to the new location. "A very touching story was told of seeing an old lady looking into the old room," wrote one of the branch's librarians. "She was shown the removal sign, for she was deaf, shook her head and moved away." The new upstairs location of the library was the reason for the push for a new library. The library board asked the Board of Estimate and Taxation for $50,000 for a new branch building. Linden Hills residents appeared at a city meeting, but the request was turned down. Not until April 1930, after a $50,000 bond issue was passed, did Linden Hills get its own branch building. The original site chosen in 1928 at Lake Harriet Boulevard and 43rd Street was no longer available so a new location was purchased for $6,000 in June 1930. The city purchased three lots on what used to be an old Indian trail to Minnetonka (in 1930 the lots were being used as a baseball field) owned by the Townsend family. Located at 2900 West 43rd Street, the colonial-style brick edifice opened on February 5, 1931. It had a stock of 10,000 books. Linden Hills resident Joseph V. Vanderbilt's firm of Bard and Vanderbilt designed the building. Pike and Cook was the contractor on the project. The basement included the children's library, staff room and kitchen. The main floor featured the adult library and a sun parlor. The building cost approximately $42,000. The building was opened just before drastic Depression-era budget cuts hit Minneapolis Public Library. In reaction to the budget cuts, Linden Hills Library hours were 9–9 pm Mondays, 9–6 pm Tuesday through Friday and 9–1 pm on Saturdays in June 1931. Linden Hills Community Library was the last newly constructed library until Nokomis library opened in 1968.

Edith Frost was the first Linden Hills Librarian from 1911 to 1946. She moved to Minneapolis with her father and sister Celia in 1911 and initially lived at 4632 Upton Avenue South. In addition to Edith, Celia also became a librarian in the Minneapolis Public Library system. In the 1915 annual library report, Edith's comments foreshadowed a separate branch library, “Separated as this community is from the rest of the city, one cannot but feel that the library might be much more of a community center. With clubrooms and an auditorium and close cooperation with the schools and commercial club, an ideal community center might be developed with an interest for everyone in Linden Hills.” In her April 1936 report Edith overheard some boys say, "Let's go into the library, I'm tired of that movie stuff," signifying results from Edith's efforts to promote children's reading. In March 1937 she reports, "we have decided that Linden Hills is a young man's library. They use the reading rooms more than any other group."

Edith was also known as an authority on local history and encouraged reading by holding contests. She set up a "fish pond" in which the children used a pole and line equipped with a magnet which allowed them to catch tissue paper fish on paperclips. The fish would furnish the weekly category of books to read. Edith was a personal friend of Joseph V. Vanderbilt and highly recommended him to be architect of the Linden Hills Community Library. Vanderbilt had lived in Minnesota since 1904 and started his own architecture firm in 1927. The talent of Vanderbilt along with the suggestions and designs of Edith and Library Director Gratia Countryman contributed to a beautiful final product. Edith and Celia later lived at 4625 Washburn Avenue. With the exception of service abroad in a Red Cross Canteen during World War I, Edith was at Linden Hills Library until she retired in 1946. Dorothy Nickels, her assistant, succeeded her and was at Linden Hills until 1970.

In the June 3, 1957 Daily Happenings, Dorothy Nickels noted that there had been a wave of heavy book losses. The latest Southwest High School locker check brought back 24 of Linden Hills Library books, 20 of which hadn’t been checked out. Nickels wondered if “some method of door checkout is becoming more and more necessary.” Overheard between two teenagers later in the year: “Have you read this book?” Indignant reply: “Is that a compliment or an insultment?” February 1958: Reference work was heavy due in large part by the “free” use by the Edina High School students.

Linden Hills had some very busy summers: on June 19, 1961 the library set a circulation record. It checked out 1500 books, averaging 3 books per minute. On June 26 it neared the record again with 1,486 books checked out. In 1980–1981 the building was refurbished with tuck pointing, slate room restoration, attic insulation, releading of windows, new combination storm windows, glass enclosures for the fireplaces, rewiring, new lighting, new heating plant, repainting and new floor for the children's area and adjacent hall. This work was also paid for in capital funds, $43,000.

As Linden Hills Library celebrated its 50th anniversary in 1981, it had approximately 25,000 hardcover books for adults and children and its hours were 1–9 pm on Monday and Thursday and 10–5:30 on Tuesday, Wednesday, Friday and Saturday (closed on Saturday in the summer).

A community survey was undertaken in 1995. Here are some interesting statistics from the study: 53% of the respondents arrived by foot, 45% by car. The most important reason the patrons used the library: a popular materials library (for 58% of patrons without children) and a children's door to learning (for 50% of patrons with children).

Also in 1995 a community advisory committee had these recommendations: The renovation should be done within the property limits (no additional land should be acquired). The renovation should be done in a manner that preserves the historic character of the library, focusing on updating the mechanical systems, technology and library service areas and make accessibility a goal. A minority report from the group was issued as well. The minority saw expansion could be impeded without further land acquisition because it would be more expensive to expand on the existing footprint and within the tight constraints prescribed by the majority of the committee.

In 1997 the library was designated locally as a historically significant building and in 2000 it was put on the National Register of Historic Places. The Library Board fought the designation as it said it worked to preserve its buildings already and historic designation could limit the type of renovations and expansions that could be done to the building.

Linden Hills Librarian Sandy Purdue was named the best Children's Librarian in the July 1998 issue of Minnesota Parent. Both the children's area environment and Sandy's story times and special events were praised by the magazine.

In 2001 another renovation was undertaken with an addition to the building as well. The project added 1200 square feet and provided a better layout for customer service. The library closed on March 24, 2001 and reopened on May 18, 2002. While the library was closed, the neighborhood was served by the bookmobile which Linden Hills staff member Teresa Mercier worked on. The reopened library's hours were 1–9 pm Monday and Thursday and 10–6 pm Tuesday, Wednesday, Friday and Saturday. The renovation was designed by Leonard Parker Associates and built by Meisinger Construction Company. The project cost $2.3 million: $2 million from the City of Minneapolis Capital Improvement Program, $150,000 Minnesota State Accessibility Grant and $133,000 Linden Hills Neighborhood Revitalization Program. The collection included 32,000 books and 19 public computer workstations. A big highlight of the renovation was the installation of stained glass over the front entrance by Phil Daniel, a Minneapolis artist.

Also in 2001 a Linden Hills oral history project was undertaken with NRP funds. Transcripts, tapes, CDs and some videos of the interviews are available in Special Collections at Minneapolis Central Library. They can be found in an author search for “Linden Hills Oral History Project” in the Hennepin County Library Catalog http://catalog.hclib.org.

In 2002 Eleanor Quirt donated one of her husband's paintings from his Lake Harriet series, "Four Figures" to the Linden Hills Library to celebrate what would have been Walter Quirt's 100th birthday. Early in his career Quirt's painting was influenced by Marxist theory but by the late 1930s he was more surrealistic and dream inspired. After World War II, the Quirts moved to Minnesota from New York and Peter taught at the University of Minnesota. Due to budget cuts in 2004, the library's days open were reduced from 6 to 3 days a week. The Library was open Monday and Wednesday 12–8 pm and Friday 10–6 pm. A Friends of Linden Hills Library was formed to advocate for the library. Some plans floated to balance the budget included closing Linden Hills but a compromise plan kept all the branches open although many had part-time hours. The "Art in the Hill" group sold T-shirts to raise money and other local organizations raised money as well.

Linden Hills and the 14 other libraries of Minneapolis Public Library were merged into the combined urban/suburban Hennepin County Library in 2008.
