= But for the Grace of God =

But for the Grace of God or There But for the Grace of God may refer to:

- But for the Grace of God (play), by Frederick Lonsdale, 1946–47
- "But for the Grace of God" (song), co-written and recorded by Keith Urban, 2000
- "There But for the Grace of God", an episode of Stargate SG-1 (season 1)
- "There But for the Grace of God", a 1979 song by American funk group Machine
- "There But for the Grace of God", a 1994 song by English duo Fire Island
- "There but for the grace of God go I", an idiomatic phrase traditionally attributed to John Bradford

== See also ==
- By the Grace of God (disambiguation)
