= By the Grace of God (disambiguation) =

By the Grace of God is a formulaic phrase acknowledging fealty to God used especially by authority in historically Christian cultures to signify power granted by divine will.

By the Grace of God (Latin: Dei Gratia, abbreviated D.G.) may also refer to:

- By the Grace of God (album), by the Hellacopters, 2002, and the title song
- By the Grace of God: The Gospel Album, by Hank Locklin, 2006
- "By the Grace of God" (song), by Katy Perry, 2013
- By the Grace of God (film), 2019
- "By the Grace of God," song by Clipse from their 2025 album, "Let God Sort Em Out," with Pharrell Williams

== See also ==
- But for the Grace of God (disambiguation)
- "There by the Grace of God", a 2003 song by the Manic Street Preachers
- Dei Gratia (disambiguation)
