= Hosmer Library =

- Thirty-sixth Street Branch Library
- U.S. National Register of Historic Places
- Minneapolis Landmark
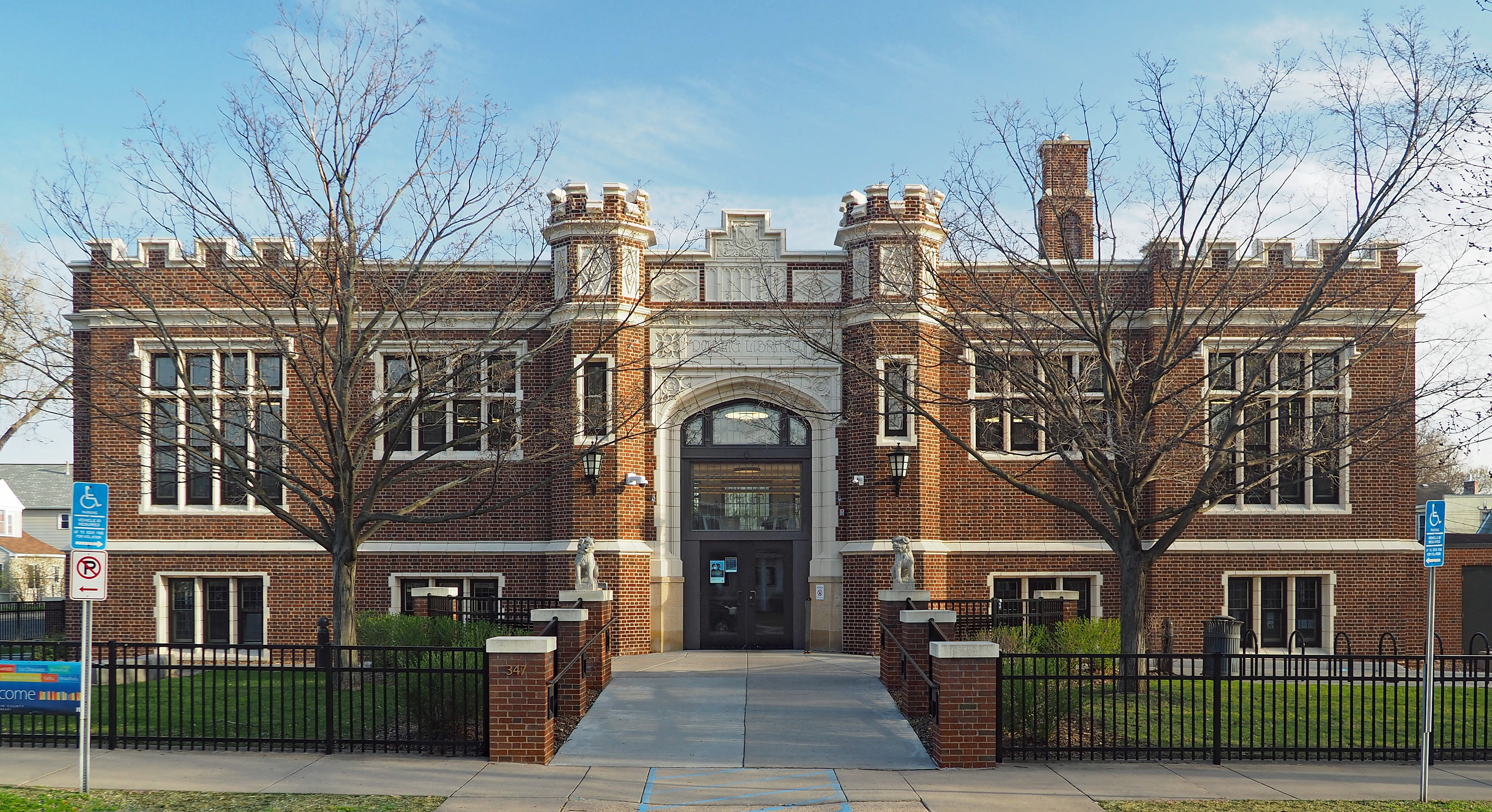
- The Hosmer Library viewed from the north

- Location within Minnesota Location within the United States
- Location: 347 E 36th St, Minneapolis, Minnesota
- Coordinates: 44°56′14″N 93°16′13″W
- Built: 1916
- Architect: Whitfield, Henry D.; Brown, James H. and Co.
- Architectural style: Tudor Revival
- NRHP reference No.: 00000541

Significant dates
- Added to NRHP: May 26, 2000
- Designated MPLSL: 1997

Hosmer Library, originally known as the Thirty-Sixth Street Branch Library, is a public library that serves the Central neighborhood within the Powderhorn community of Minneapolis, Minnesota. A member of the Hennepin County Library system, it is named after James Kendall Hosmer, the former president of the American Library Association and was listed on the National Register of Historic Places in 2000.

== History ==
The Thirty-Sixth Street Branch Library was constructed during a time of significant immigration to Minneapolis. As the tenth library built in the city, it officially opened on March 8, 1916. At the time it was built, the library was in a sparsely developed Scandinavian neighborhood and one block away from the since-demolished Central High School. In 1926, the branch was renamed in honor of James Kendall Hosmer, who was Minneapolis' second city librarian. It is the last of the three Carnegie library branches remaining in Minneapolis, with the others being the Franklin and the Sumner libraries. The construction of the library was led by librarian Gratia Countryman and funded by the Carnegie Corporation. The building features a Tudor Revival style, characterized by polygonal towers on either side of the main entrance, a crenellated parapet and terra cotta trim. The two granite lion-dogs outside the entrance were donated by family of Mrs. Lewis Gillette.

Following Countryman's research-based proposal to secure funding from the Carnegie Corporation, she prepared a compelling summary of library circulation and analyzed the city's residents. This analysis identified demographic and ethnic patterns, which led to tailored programming designed for each neighborhood’s library. Construction of the 90 by 54 foot building began in May 1914, with total costs amounting to $27,700 for plans designed by Henry D. Whitefield, a New York-based architect and the brother-in-law of Andrew Carnegie. It is one of nine Minneapolis libraries that still exist today, directly attributed to Countryman's significant efforts in building the library infrastructure to serve a growing immigrant population. When it was built, Hosmer was situated in a neighborhood with few residents, primarily of Scandinavian descent. In 1969, in response to the changing demographics of the area, an African American reading room was dedicated at Hosmer to better serve its patrons. Today, Hosmer is one of eight Minneapolis public libraries listed as historic landmarks in the National Register of Historic Places.

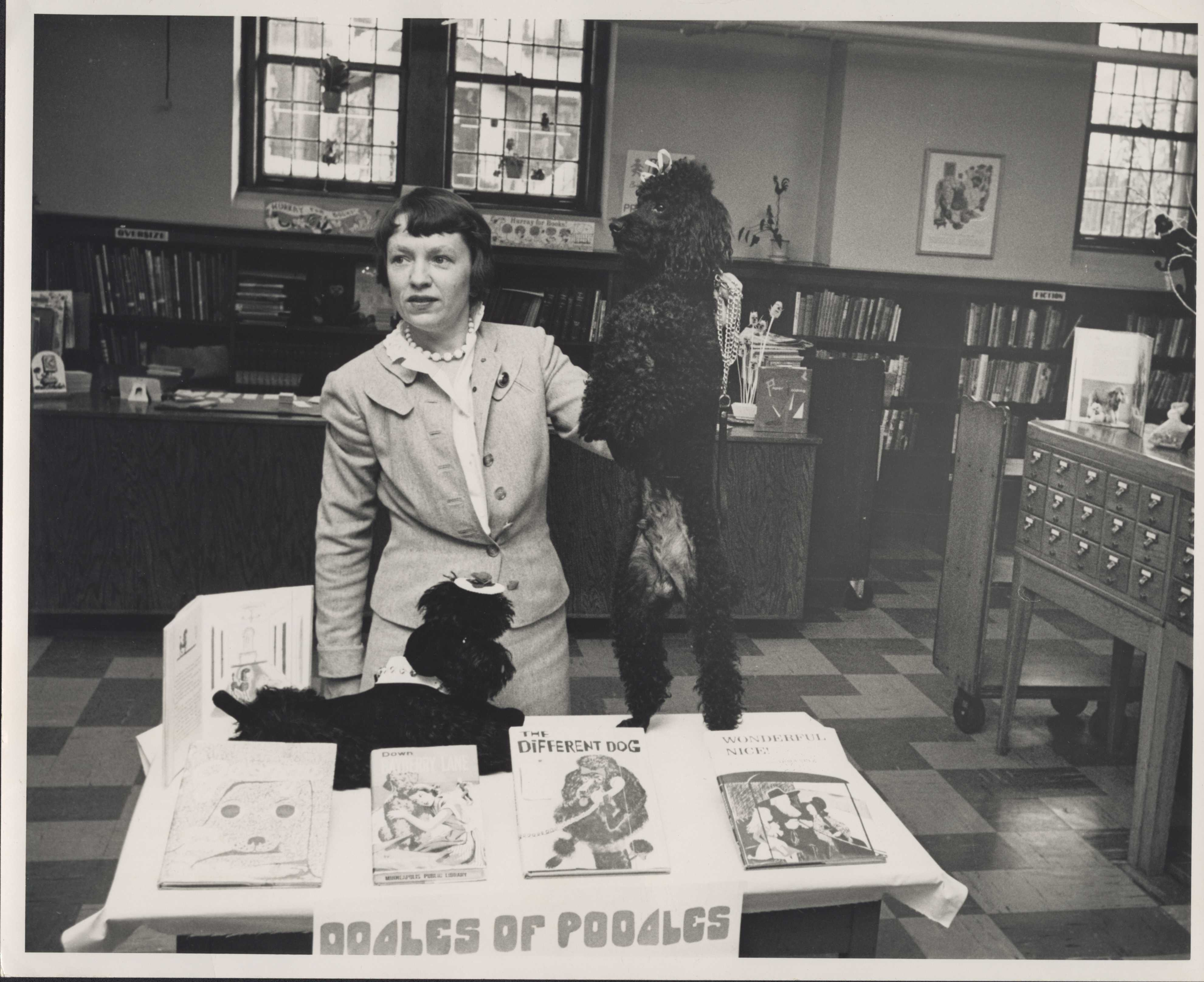
Children's Librarian Betty Welles demonstrating a display at the library

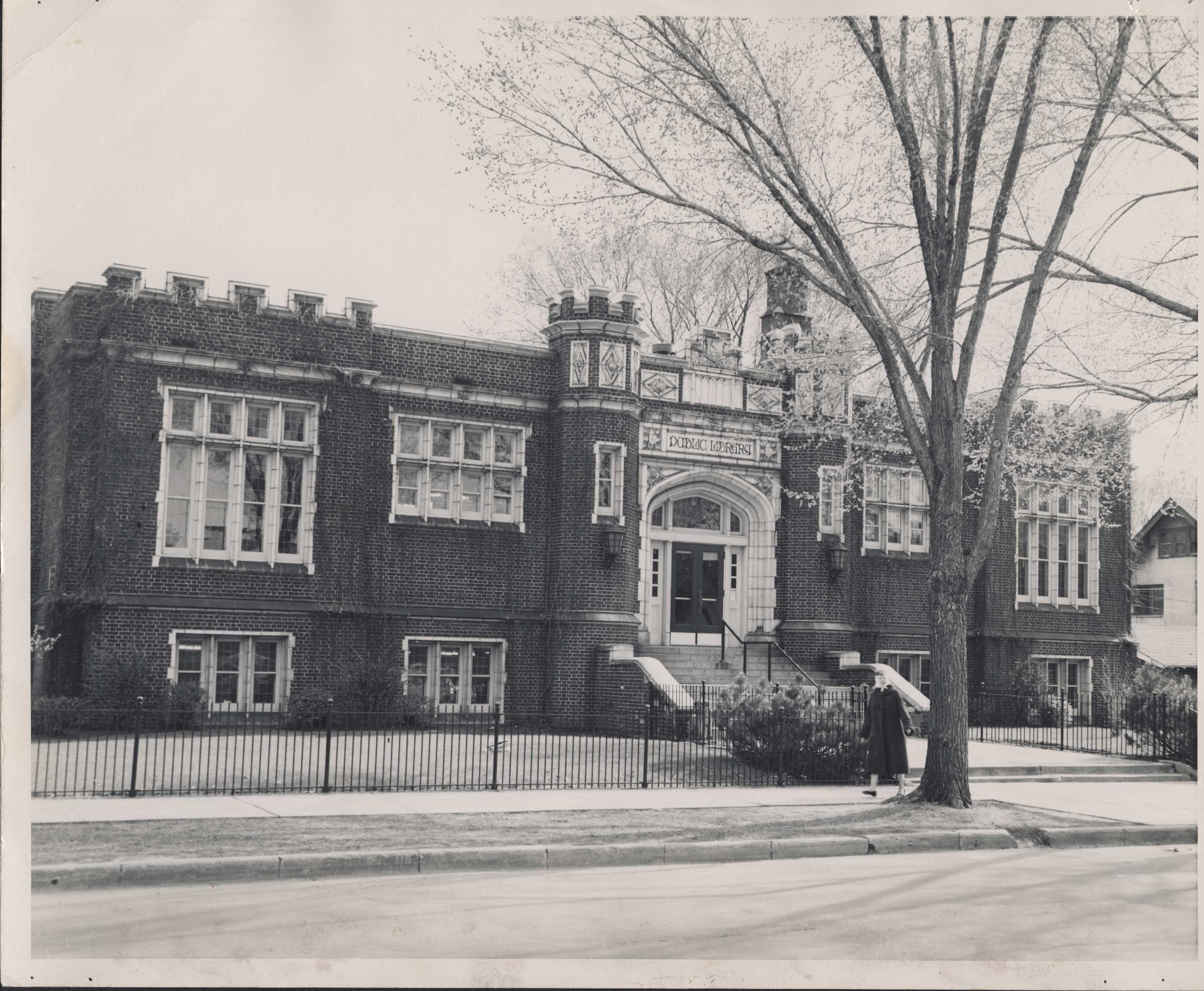
Hosmer Library was built in 1916 and continues to serve as a public library today

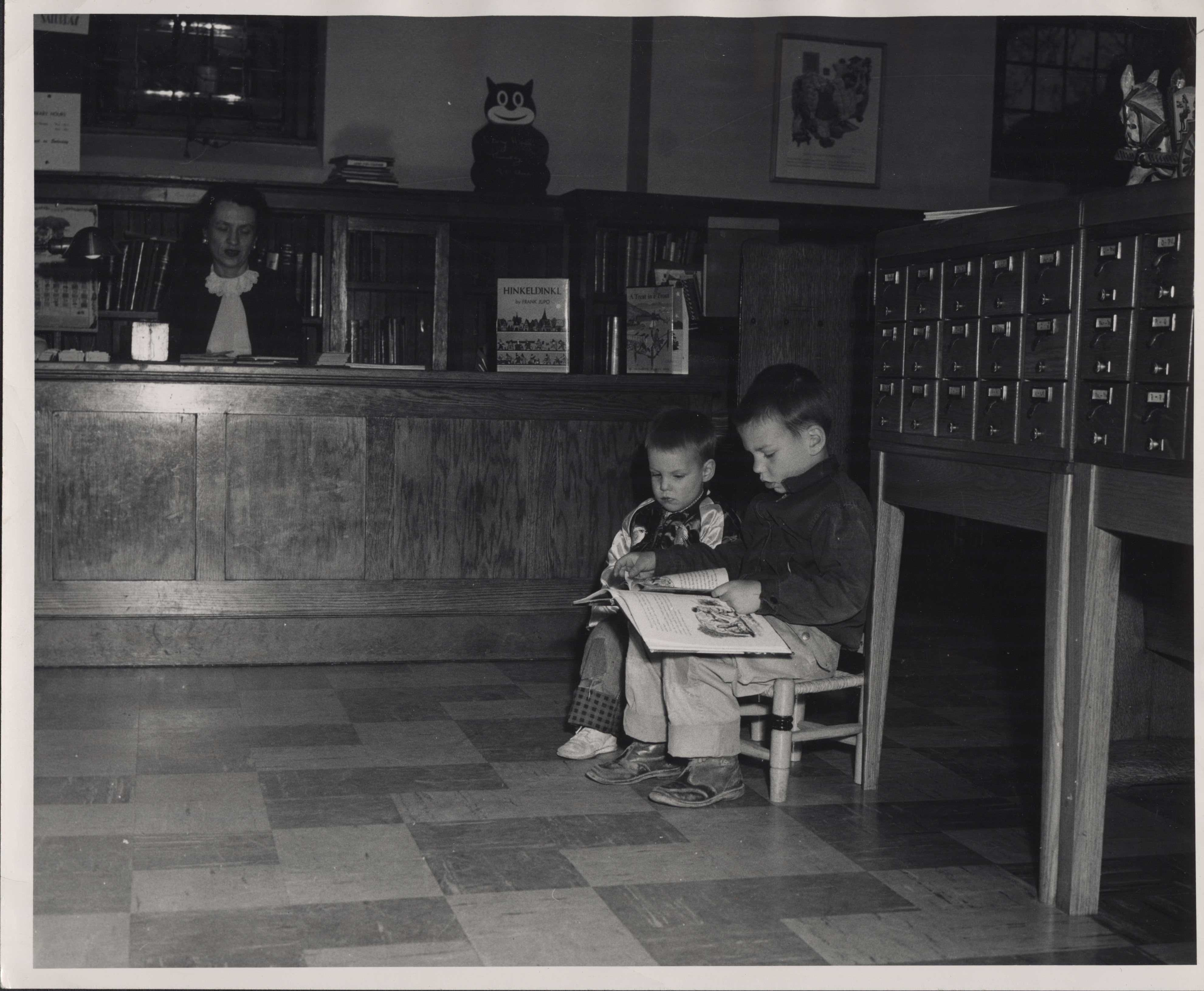
Boys using the library

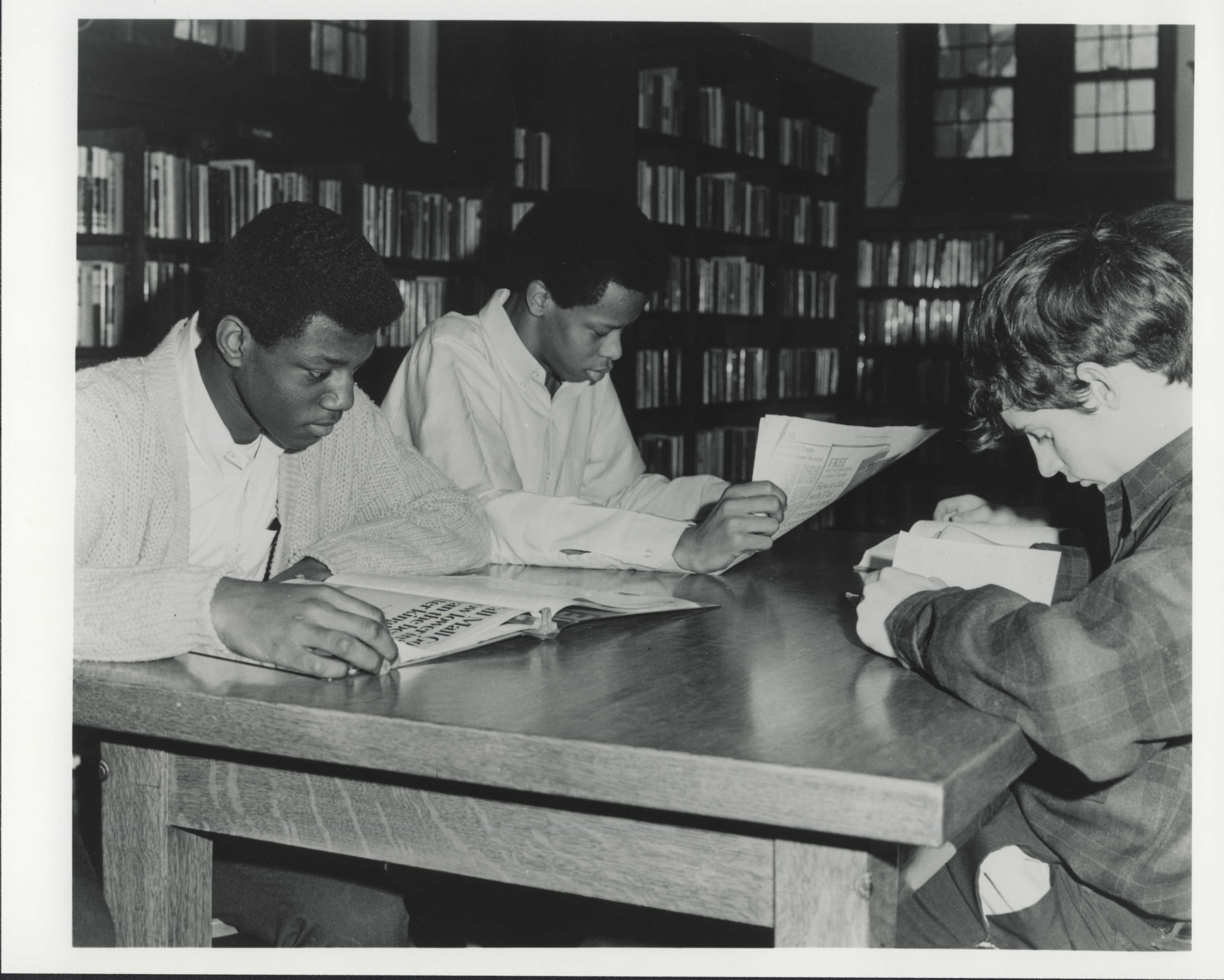
Teens reading

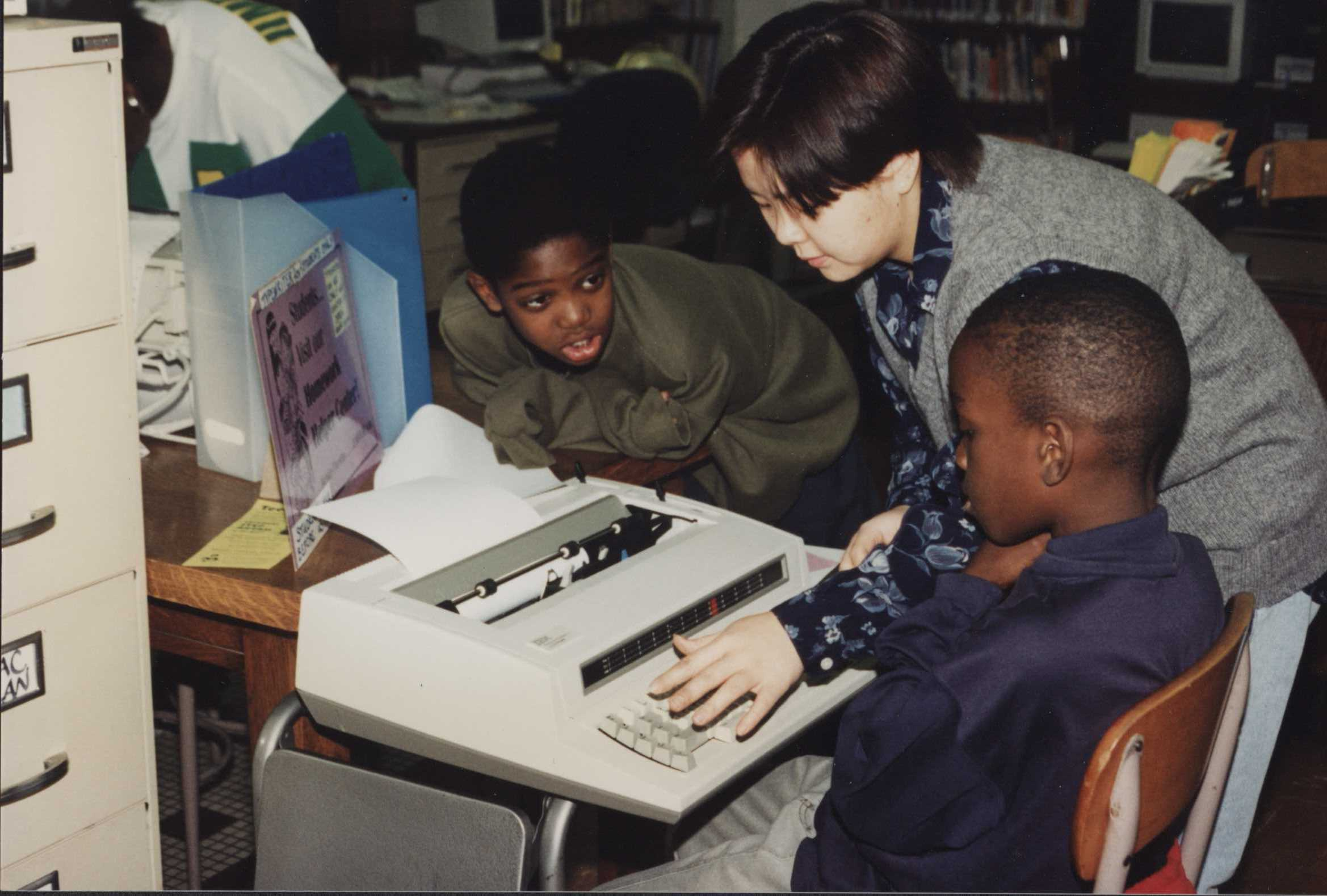
Technology training at Hosmer Library

== Roy Woodstrom ==
For many years, Hosmer Head Librarian Roy Woodstrom was at the vanguard of innovation in delivering services to patrons. Following significant budget cuts in 2004, the City of Minneapolis elected to reduce libraries' hours of service. At Hosmer, open days dropped to four days a week. Neighbors rallied in 2004, when the Bancroft Neighborhood Association voted to give $7,000 to the Hosmer branch following a presentation by Woodstrom so that the library could be open five days a week. On behalf of Hosmer, Woodstrom explored becoming a 501(c)3 corporation, a non-profit, to raise the money to grow the library's open days from four to five. He successfully petitioned the Kingfield Neighborhood Association in October 2004 for a Social Services Grant in the amount of $5,000 towards for cultural and community programs.

Woodstrom launched the Hosmer World Music Concert Series in 2002 with weekly live music on Saturday afternoons. Funding comes from a variety of sources including the Minnesota Arts and Cultural Heritage Fund, Metropolitan Regional Arts Council with additional support from Friends of the Hosmer Library and KFAI Radio. Previously, Woodstrom developed the Hosmer Library Talent Show, a cherished annual event for the neighborhood's performers, which made its debut in 1998. He also started the Hosmer Library Friends Group, which helps the branch meet patrons' needs through volunteerism, book sales, fundraising, and acting as liaisons between the library and the community. His legacy also includes the World Film Series, hosted at the Library. Woodstrom retired in 2014.

== Updating the building ==
In 1951, an enclosure was added to the east side stairway for $900. Recognizing the limited access of the building, a ground level entry and an elevator were added in 1980. By 1996 it was determined that the building required a major overhaul to meet patrons' needs, and the Minneapolis Library Board considered closing Hosmer. Faced with that possibility, neighbors from Central, Bryant, Powderhorn Park and Kingfield banded together, and contributed more than $157,000 in Neighborhood Revitalization Program funds to ensure that their treasured library would stay open and get the necessary upgrades. They were successful: circulation rates were triple what they were before the remodeling, and Hosmer had ten times as many daily visitors. In August 2019, Hosmer Library was once again remodelled, adding dedicated Teen and Children's sections, as well as other improvements.

== Tailored programs ==
K-12 Homework Help is a program for students in the neighborhood. Annually, the birthday of James Hosmer is celebrated at the branch with festivities and an exhibit about his contributions to the city of Minneapolis libraries. Today, Hosmer remains a vital hub, serving the information needs of its patrons and the community with many programs. A STEAM-based program called STEAM Squad is also offered at Hosmer
