= Dei Gratia (disambiguation) =

Dei Gratia may refer to:

- Dei gratia, Latin for "By the Grace of God", a paraphrase from St. Paul in the Bible, 1 Corinthians 15:8–10, which states, "Last of all, as to one born abnormally, he appeared to me. For I am the least of the apostles, not fit to be called an apostle, because I persecuted the church of God. But by the grace of God I am what I am...".
- Dei Gratia, Latin for "By the Grace of God", an expression used in some royal titles
- Dei Gratia (brigantine), a Canadian ship

== See also ==
- Dei Gratia Rex, Latin title inscribed on some coins
- Deo gratias ("Thank God"), a response in Catholic liturgy
