= Charles H. Compton =

American librarian (1880–1966)

President of the American Library Association
- In office 1934–1935
- Preceded by: Gratia A. Countryman
- Succeeded by: Louis Round Wilson

Personal details
- Born: Charles Herrick Compton; October 24, 1880 Palmyra, Nebraska, US
- Died: March 17, 1966 (aged 85) St. Louis, Missouri, US
- Education: University of Nebraska
- Occupation: Librarian

Charles Herrick Compton (October 24, 1880 – March 17, 1966) was an American librarian and educator. Compton earned a degree from the University of Nebraska in 1901 and then attended the New York State library School from 1905 to 1908. He worked for the Seattle Public Library from 1910 to 1917 and left to work for the American Library Association during the first world war, buying books for the Library War Service. After the war, Compton went to work as an Assistant librarian for the St. Louis Public Library where he became Director in 1938. He retired from the St. Louis Public Library in 1950.

Compton served as president of the American Library Association from 1934 to 1935.

== Publications ==
- The St. Louis public library today and tomorrow; a survey (1939)
- Memories of a Librarian (1954)
- My European trip and the International Library Congress, April 25, 1935 to June 2, 1935 (1962)

Non-profit organization positions
Preceded by Gratia A. Countryman	President of the American Library Association; 1934–1935	Succeeded by Louis Round Wilson
