= Gratia Countryman =

American librarian (1866–1953)

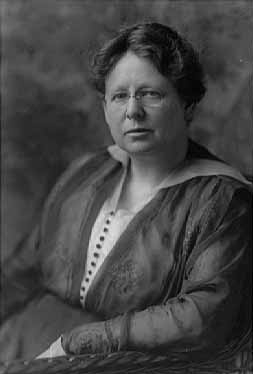
- Countryman in 1917

President of the American Library Association
- In office 1933–1934
- Preceded by: Harry Miller Lydenberg
- Succeeded by: Charles H. Compton

Personal details
- Born: Gratia Alta Countryman; November 29, 1866 Hastings, Minnesota, US
- Died: July 26, 1953 (aged 86) Duluth, Minnesota, US
- Education: University of Minnesota
- Occupation: Librarian

Gratia Alta Countryman (pronounced gray-sha) (November 29, 1866 – July 26, 1953) was a nationally-known librarian who led the Minneapolis Public Library from 1904 to 1936. She was the daughter of immigrant farmers Alta and Levi Countryman. She pioneered many ways to make the library more accessible and user-friendly to all of the city's residents, regardless of age or economic position. Countryman was called the "first lady of Minneapolis" and the "Jane Addams of the libraries".

== Early life ==
Gratia Countryman was born on November 29, 1866 to Levi and Alta Chamberlain Countryman. Her father was a Latin scholar and Civil War veteran who had studied at Hamline University, and named her after the Latin root of thanks. She had two older brothers and a younger sister. Countryman graduated from Hastings High School in 1882, and her father moved the family to Minneapolis so that both she and her sister could attend college.

== Professional life ==
Countryman graduated from the University of Minnesota with a Bachelor of Science degree and Phi Beta Kappa honors in 1889. She was recommended by university president Cyrus Northrop to Herbert Putnam for a job at the Minneapolis Public Library, where she started in 1889 under James Kendall Hosmer. She was the nation's first female head librarian at the Minneapolis Public Library from 1904 to 1936. When she accepted this job, she knew that she would be making one third less than her predecessor, with a yearly salary of $2,000.

Due to her philosophy of outreach, collections and reading rooms were established in Minneapolis fire halls, factories, hospitals, and an open-air reading area in Gateway Park. Countryman was a capable leader who, over her 32 years as head librarian, helped increase the library’s scope and reach exponentially. She oversaw the building of 12 branches and a mobile library truck, and she and her staff added over 500,000 volumes to the already substantial catalog. The programs she developed encouraged children to read, continued the education of adolescents and young adults, and helped adults find and hold jobs during times of war, recession and depression.

She was very active in the Minnesota Library Association and served as MLA president in 1904 and 1905. She established The Minnesota Library Commission and remained recording secretary of that group until 1918. From 1912 to 1914, Countryman organized and was president of the Foreign Policy Association Women's International League for Peace and Freedom. She also served on the National Liberty and War Service Committee and the Woman's Warfare League.

In 1931, she was awarded the Civic Service Honor Medal by the Inter-Racial Service Council of Minneapolis for Outstanding Civic Service for work with immigrants. In 1932, she was awarded an honorary MA degree from the University of Minnesota for Distinguished Public Service; this was "only the fourth honorary degree conferred by the university and the first received by a woman."

In 1934, Countryman served as president of the American Library Association. She was forced into retirement by the city's pension law at age 70 in 1936.

== Personal life ==
Countryman never married but lived with her longtime partner, Marie Todd, for thirty eight years. In May 1917, they took in a homeless boy named Wellington Wilson, and Countryman later was awarded guardianship of him. Wellington Wilson later changed his name to Wellington Countryman. He eventually married and had a daughter whom he named Alta Countryman after his adoptive mother. The Countrymans lived in Chicago, Illinois, and Wellington died in 1997.

Gratia Countryman's eulogy summed up her life perfectly: "In her youth a library was a sacred precinct for guarding the treasures of thought, to be entered only by the scholar and the student... Her crusading zeal carried the book to every part of her city and county, to the little child, the factory worker, the farmer, the businessman, the hospital patient, the blind and the old."

Non-profit organization positions
Preceded by Harry Miller Lydenberg	President of the American Library Association; 1933–1934	Succeeded by Charles H. Compton
