= Nokomis Library =

Public library in Minneapolis, Minnesota, USA

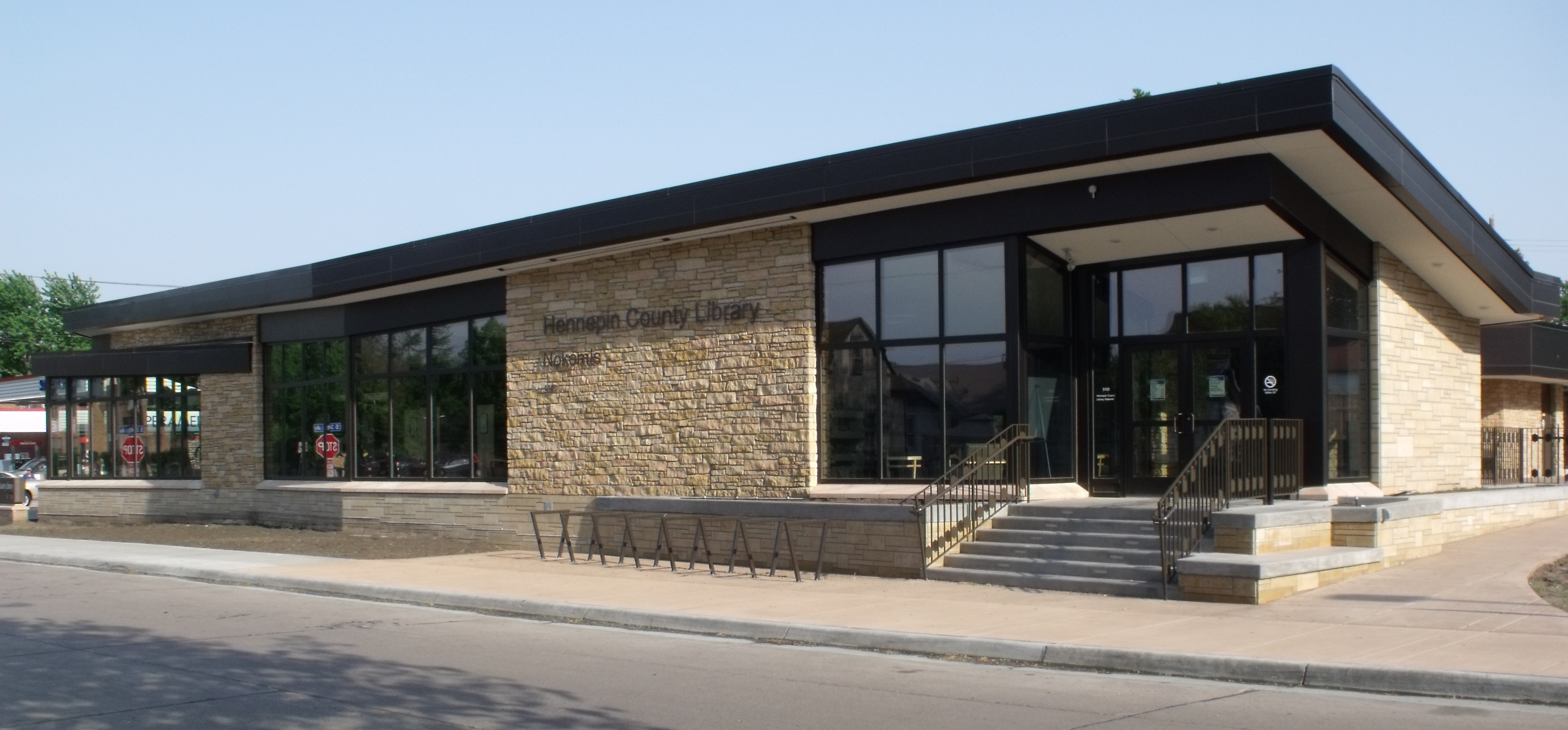
- The renovated front of the library, along 51st Street
- Interactive map of the Nokomis Library area
- Former names: Nokomis Community Library

General information
- Type: Branch library
- Location: 5100 34th Ave S. Minneapolis, Minnesota
- Coordinates: 44°54′37.89″N 93°13′23.69″W
- Construction started: 1967
- Completed: 1968
- Renovated: 2009–2011
- Cost: $530,000
- Renovation cost: $7 million
- Owner: Hennepin County Library

Technical details
- Floor count: 2
- Floor area: 17,340 square feet (1,611 m^{2})

Design and construction
- Architects: Buetow and Associates, Inc.

Renovating team
- Architect: KKE Architects
- Renovating firm: Ebert, Inc.

Other information
- Parking: 17,700-square-foot (1,644 m^{2}) surface lot

Nokomis Library, formerly Nokomis Community Library, is a branch library serving the Nokomis East area of Minneapolis, Minnesota. One of 41 libraries in the Hennepin County Library system, Nokomis was designed by Buetow and Associates, Inc and opened in 1968 as a replacement for the nearby Longfellow Community Library. After being deemed crowded and outdated in 1999, the library underwent a renovation beginning in 2009 that saw it gain a number of environmentally friendly features and an expansion of 4,300 square feet (399 m^{2}). The building reopened in 2011 and includes a restored Wind and Water Chime, a stabile that was part of the original library and that was refurbished and reinstalled by July 2013. The library contains over 35 computers, a public meeting room, and a Spanish-language collection of materials.

== History ==
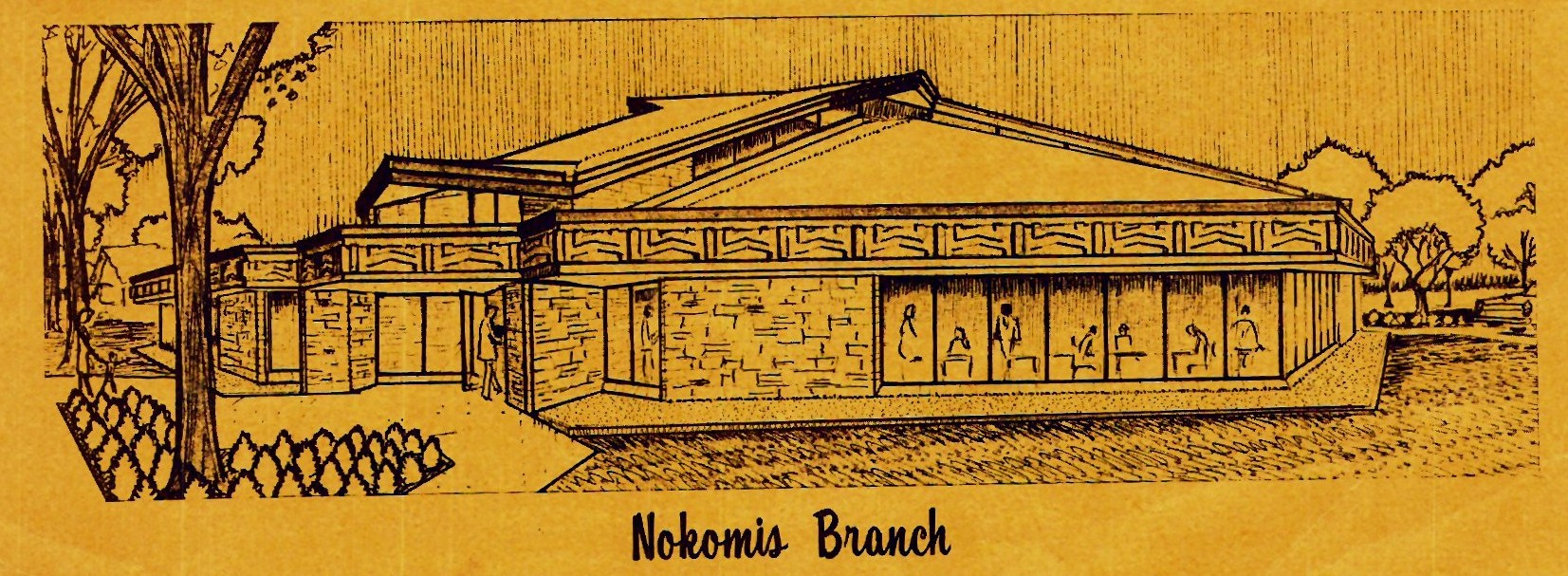
The front exterior of Nokomis, from a 1968 informational brochure

Nokomis was the newest branch added to the Minneapolis Public Library system in 1967; the previous one was the Linden Hills Community Library, which was completed in 1931. It was built to replace the former Longfellow Community Library that had served the Nokomis East area for many years. In 1967, the City of Minneapolis had Buetow and Associates, Inc design the new library building, which was modeled after a tepee from the poem The Song of Hiawatha by Henry Wadsworth Longfellow. Additionally, the library was named for Nokomis in said poem, making the branch the only library in the system to be named after a fictional character. The library featured a reading loft, basement meeting room, and 13,426 square feet (1,247 m^{2}). Construction on it began in 1967 and concluded the following year at a total cost of $530,000. The project utilized limestone produced by Mankato Kasota Stone, a local stone company quarrying in the Minnesota River Valley that had been responsible for providing stone for Minneapolis's Stone Arch Bridge. The library opened in September 1968 and immediately doubled the circulation of the old Longfellow branch.

A decreased budget led to Nokomis losing its Saturday operating hours in 2004. The Nokomis East Neighborhood Association, Thrivent Financial for Lutherans, and members of the community subsequently put funds towards keeping the library open on Saturdays until in mid-2005 when money was reallocated in the budget for continued Saturday operation. Further budget woes continued to plague the Minneapolis Public Libraries as of early 2007, by which point the system had had to temporarily close three different branches in part due to a loss of local government aid. A merger with the Hennepin County Libraries was approved by both systems' boards along with the Minneapolis City Council and Nokomis reopened at 10 am on January 2, 2008, as a Hennepin County Library. It remained the only building in the newly expanded 41-library system to be named for a fictional character.

== Renovation ==
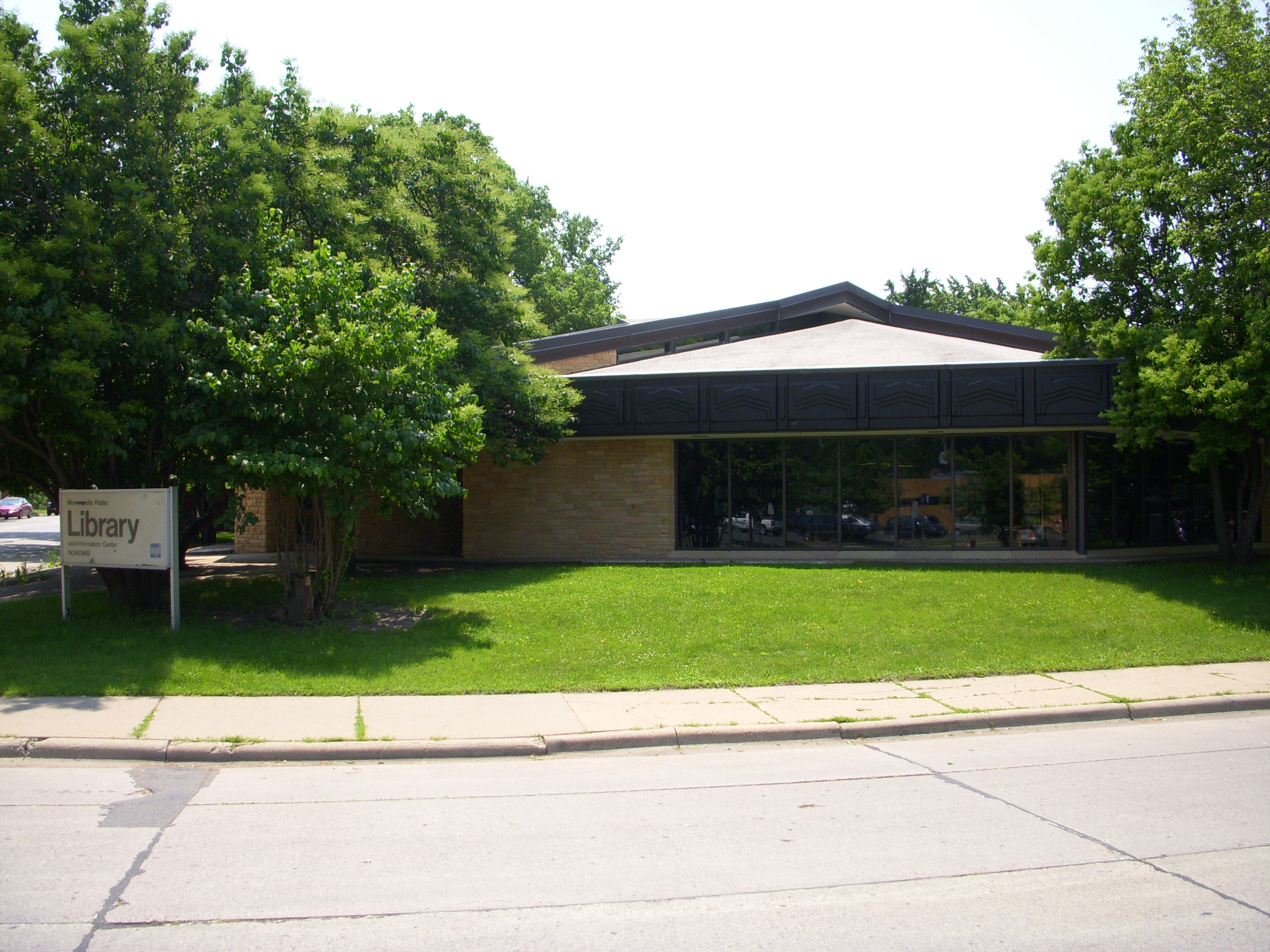
The library pre-renovation in 2008

In 1999, the Minneapolis Library Board issued a report entitled Outlook Twenty Ten identifying the changing needs of each of the system's libraries. Deeming Nokomis crowded and outdated, the report proposed three options. Option A proposed combining Nokomis with the nearby Roosevelt Community Library in a 25,000-square-foot (2,323 m^{2}) space and closing both Nokomis and Roosevelt. This would have allowed the library to operate out of a state-of-the-art building at an undecided location. Option B recommended moving Nokomis to a different site without moving Roosevelt. The new library there would have been 18,000 square feet (1,672 m^{2}). Option C included capital improvements to Nokomis, such as replacing carpeting, signs, and the roof. A 2003 update to the report identified a project start date of 2007, with full closure in 2008 and a reopening in 2009.

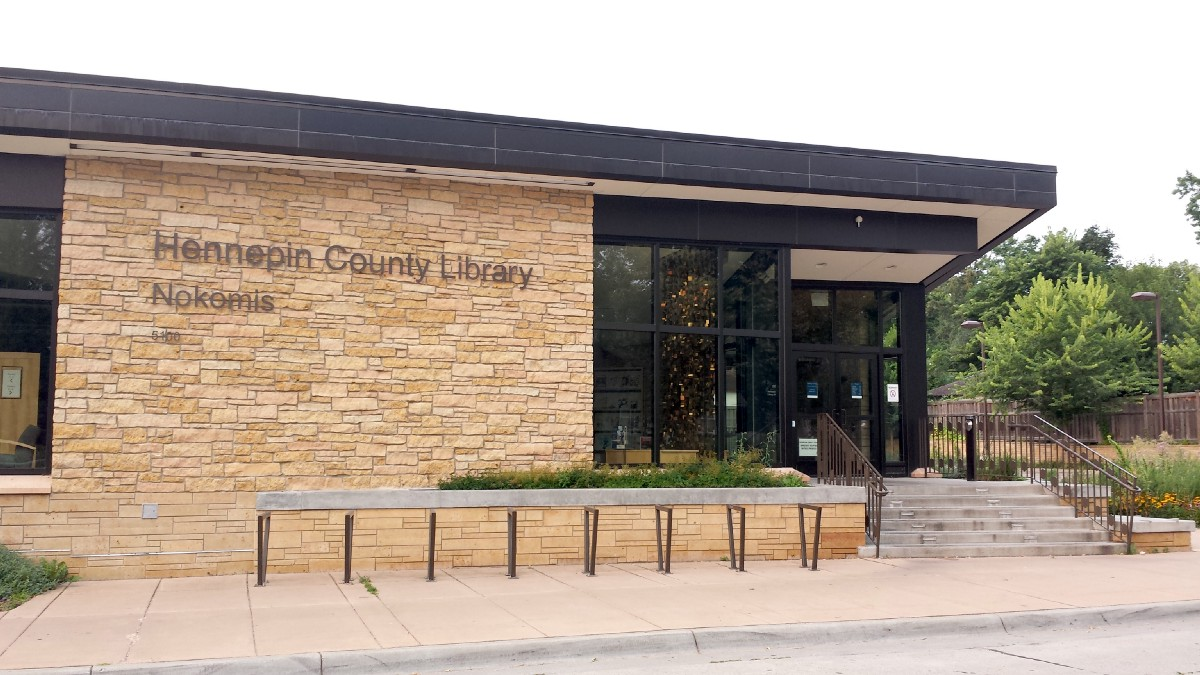
The library post-renovation in 2018

In 2007, the Minneapolis City Council appropriated a portion of its $1.35 billion 2008 budget for improvements to Nokomis and Northeast Community Library. $5.2 million of the $7 million project came from the city; Hennepin County put forward $1.8 million for environmental additions to the library and other features. The new building was designed by KKE Architects with significant input from a citizen advisory committee. Ebert, Inc. was hired as the general contractor. The old building's last day of operation was September 12, 2009, at which time it was reported in the Longfellow/Nokomis Messenger that the renovated library was expected to reopen sometime in the fall of the next year. During the construction, patrons were encouraged to make use of nearby libraries including East Lake, Roosevelt, Washburn, and Southdale.

The renovation included expanding the size of the library about 4,300 square feet (399 m^{2}) to a total size of 17,340 square feet (1,611 m^{2}). A new lighting system that automatically adjusts based on the levels of light within the building was installed, along with a geothermal heating apparatus. Other environmentally friendly interior features included carpeting constructed from recycled fibers and low-flow faucets. A stormwater management system and native planting were utilized on the building's exterior. The library once again incorporated materials from Mankato Kasota Stone, making the difference between the old and new exterior surfaces virtually indistinguishable. The teen section was significantly expanded and a new ground-floor meeting room was built. The children's section was also subject to improvements, gaining new nature-inspired design elements including bird light fixtures. Collections were updated and expanded as well, including the purchasing of new books, DVDs, and CDs. The library finally reopened on April 30, 2011, after being closed for 19 months of renovation.

== Wind and Water Chime ==
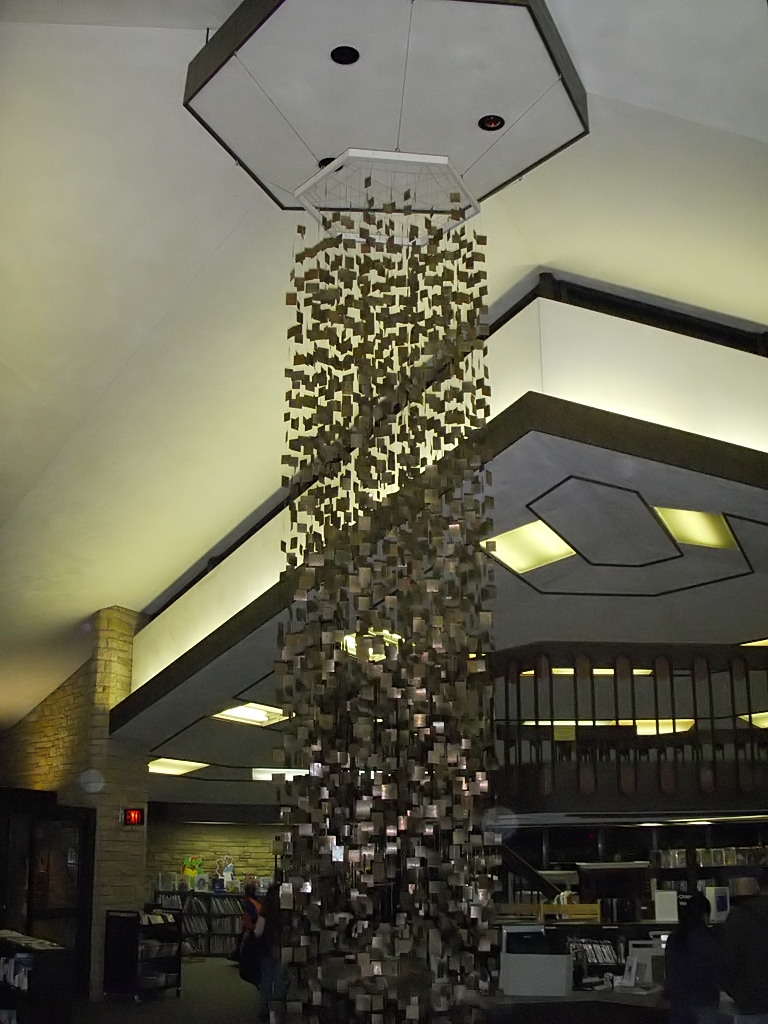
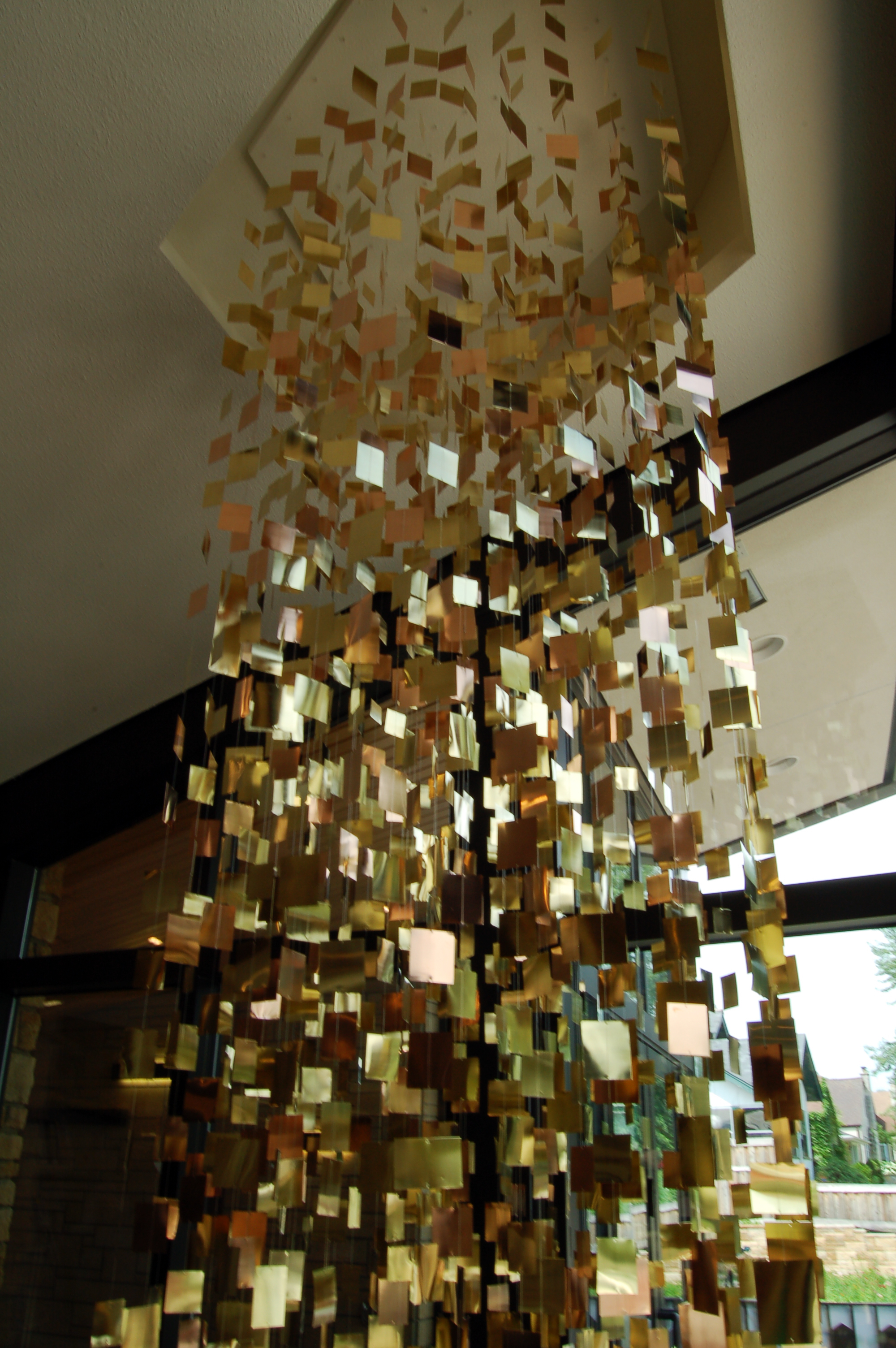
Wind and Water Chime as it hung in 2008 before the renovation (left) and in 2013 after it had been cleaned and restored (right)

Pre-renovation Nokomis featured a hanging sculpture called Wind and Water Chime which hung above a fountain. Classified as a stabile, a piece of artwork similar to a mobile only not intended to move, Wind and Water Chime consisted of 4,000 individual components, including small brass and phosphorus bronze rectangles strung on 600 yards (549 m) of filament lines. The piece was designed and built by Don Celender, a conceptual artist who taught at Macalester College in Saint Paul, Minnesota. The installation was intended to evoke the nearby Minnehaha Falls, which, like Nokomis, was referenced in Longfellow's The Song of Hiawatha.

After Nokomis's closure for renovation, Wind and Water Chime was taken out of the library and stored. Hennepin County projects costing more than $1 million are subject to the One Percent for Art program, wherein 1% of a project's budget is dedicated to the "selection, purchase and installation" of artwork within the space of the project. At the recommendation of the Nokomis Library Public Art Selection Committee, Nokomis's $52,000 art budget was spent hiring Kristin Cheronis to polish, clean, protect, and restring the entire installation with the aim of returning it to its initial appearance. It was reinstalled in Nokomis by Joel Pieper Fine Arts, now hanging near the building's entrance on the library's west side in an adult reading area. A ceremony celebrating the stabile's return was held on July 13, 2013.

== Services ==
As of 2015, Nokomis Library is open six days per week, from Monday though Saturday. The library hosts 37 computer workstations, 24 more than before the renovation, and has its own Wi-Fi network. The building is home to a publicly reservable meeting room that was designed for a capacity between five and 36 persons. Nokomis holds a Spanish-language collection, including materials intended for adults and children. A teen gaming group meets weekly in Nokomis's meeting room. The library has a 17,700-square-foot (1,644 m^{2}) parking lot accessible from 51st Street. In 2008, Nokomis's patrons, 53% of whom were adults and 47% of whom were children, checked out a total of 240,334 items from the library.

The Friends of Nokomis Library is an organization through which community members may support the library.
