= Robert "Fish" Jones =

American zookeeper

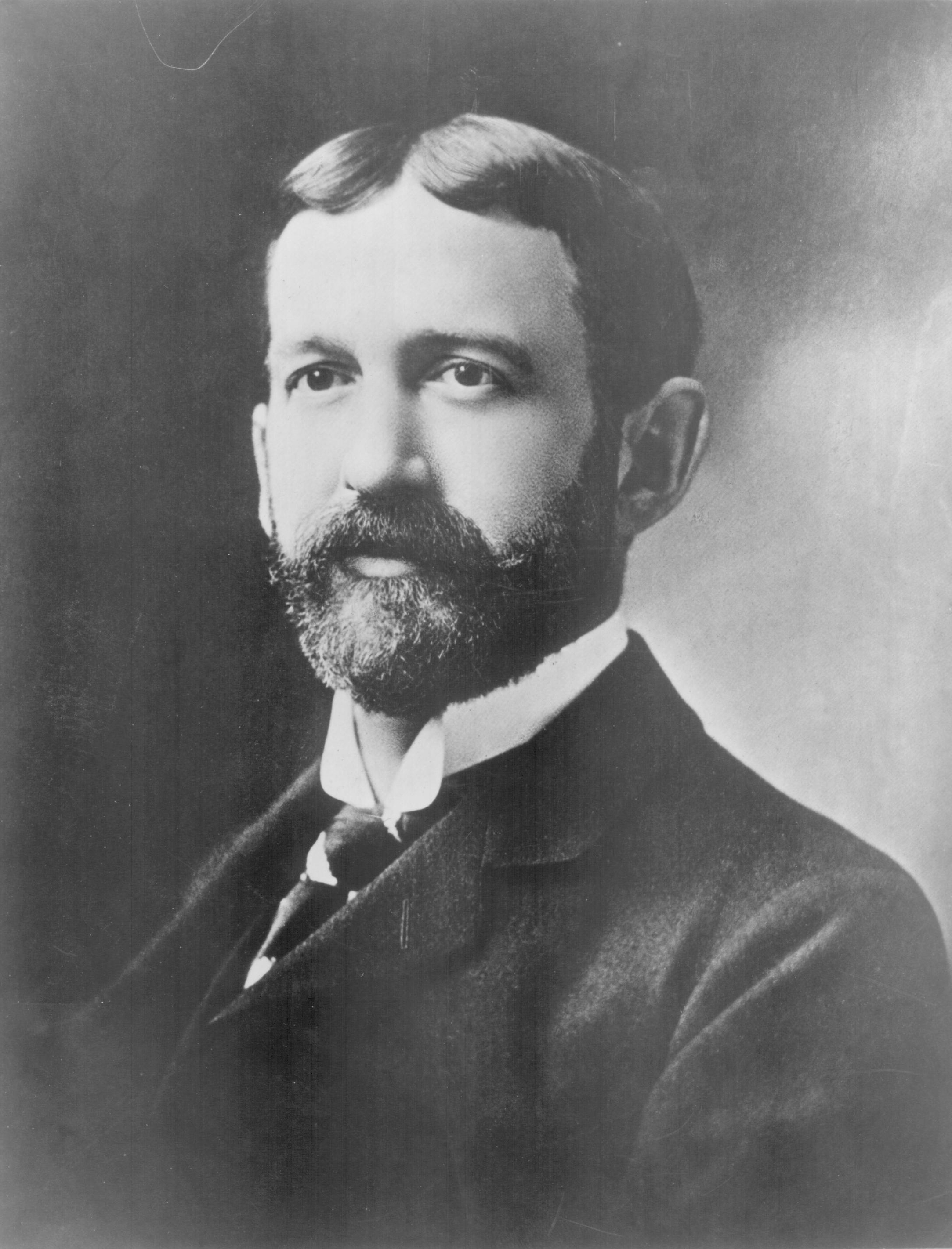
Jones in his younger years.

Robert Fremont "Fish" Jones (?–1930) was a Minneapolis, Minnesota businessman and showman. His prominence led to him driving Ulysses S. Grant and William T. Sherman down Nicollet Avenue (later Nicollet Mall) in downtown Minneapolis for their post-war tours.

== Early days ==
Jones came to Minneapolis from upstate New York in 1876. He first worked as a meat deliverer, but was unimpressed with the job, so he quit and invested $500 in a fish market on Hennepin Avenue. The fish market prospered so much that Jones was able to buy a front-page advertisement in the St. Paul Pioneer Press that displayed him as a bird with oysters for wings. The advertisement earned him the nickname "The Oyster King" which stuck for the rest of his life. Owning the fish market also earned him the nickname "Fish".

== Animals and the Zoological Gardens ==
Jones had a bear imported and tethered in front of his market to both amuse and scare customers. He also owned a camel and tigers which he kept on the third floor of his building in downtown Minneapolis. His fondness for animals was such that in 1886 he sold his fish market and moved west down Hennepin Avenue. On a three-acre farm, he built a zoo in which he put six lions from South Africa, cougars and other animals.

In 1906, Jones sold his zoo to the Roman Catholic Church who built the Basilica of St. Mary on its site after receiving complaints about noise from neighbors. He moved his zoo a quieter portion of town, the area around Minnehaha Falls. He rebuilt his zoo as the Longfellow Zoological Gardens, and a two-thirds scale replica of Henry Wadsworth Longfellow's house where he lived. He built his zoo up and by the late 1920s, it included a polar bear, seals and elephants.

== Death and legacy ==
Jones died on October 15, 1930, at his home in the Gardens. He was buried in Lakewood Cemetery. His relatives tried to keep the zoo open, but failed and closed it and sold most of the animals to the Como Zoo by 1936. His son, Roy Jones, built a barge and gathered the remaining animals to create a floating zoo on the Mississippi River. He was not heard from again after he left Minnesota. Jones's house still stands as an interpretive center run by the Minneapolis Park & Recreation Board.
