= Roosevelt Library =

- Roosevelt Branch Library
- U.S. National Register of Historic Places
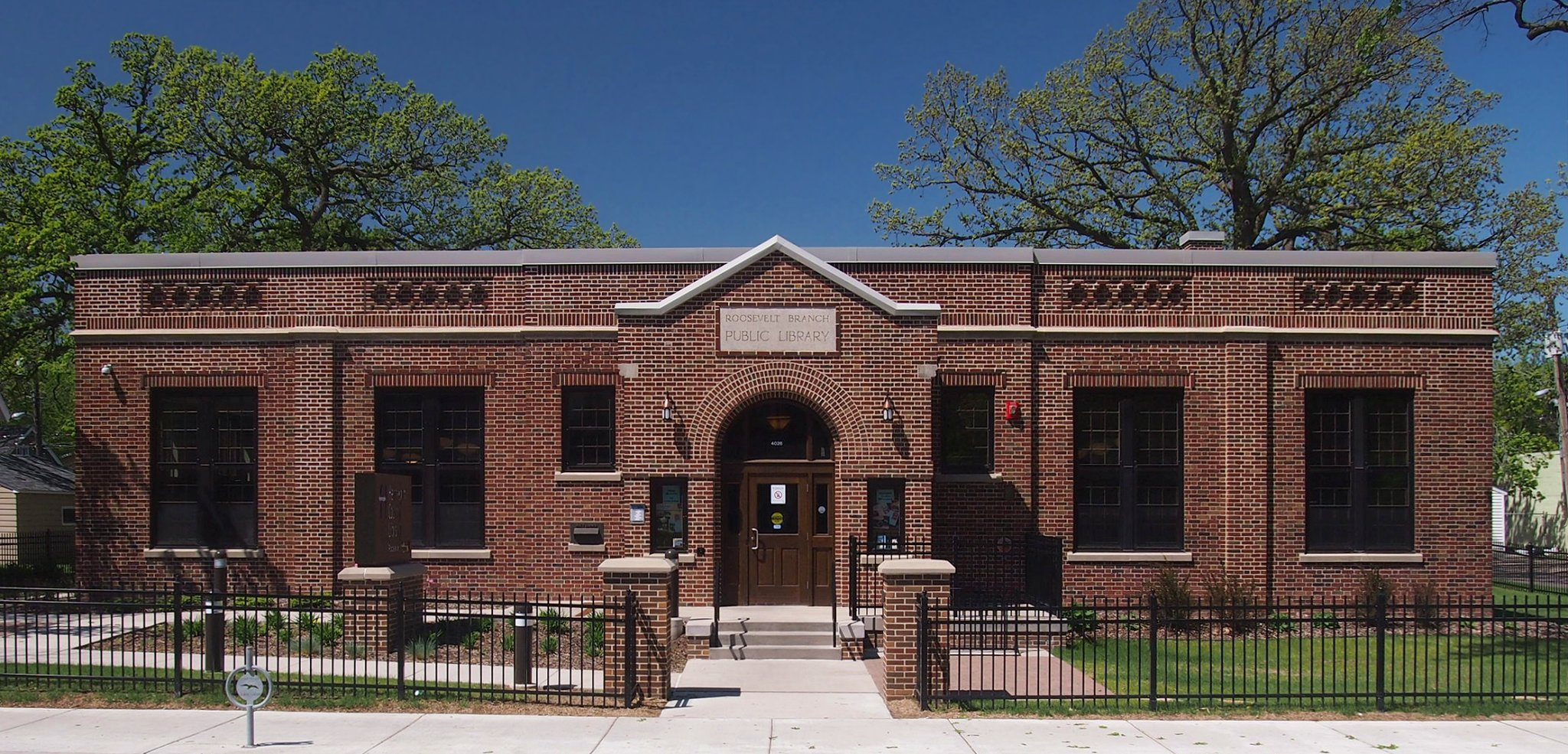
- Roosevelt Library from the east

- Location within Minnesota Location within the United States
- Location: 4026 28th Avenue South, Minneapolis, Minnesota
- Coordinates: 44°55′46.5″N 93°13′57″W
- Built: 1927
- Architect: Klarquist, S.M. and Son
- Architectural style: Tudor Revival
- NRHP reference No.: 00000543
- Added to NRHP: May 26, 2000

Roosevelt Library is one of 41 community libraries in the Hennepin County Library System, originally part of the Minneapolis Public Library System as it is located in Minneapolis, Minnesota, United States.

== Early years ==
Roosevelt Library was originally built inside and named for Roosevelt High School (named after Theodore Roosevelt) in Minneapolis's Standish neighborhood in 1922. In this way, it not only served the high school students, but also the adults of the neighborhood. In the 1920s, Standish experienced a 50% population boom consisting mainly of Swedish immigrants, so Roosevelt was available to them for language-learning and job-finding resources. However, Roosevelt soon outgrew the high school as the neighborhood flourished, so in 1926 the Minneapolis Public Library purchased a package of land directly west of Roosevelt High School for $28,000. They hired Klarquist, S.M. and Son to design the new library building. The architectural firm did so, designing a brick and wood building in the Tudor Revival style. The building was modeled after the original East Lake Community Library, also a Minneapolis library, although Roosevelt had a small amount of front yard space where East Lake did not. On February 15, 1927, Roosevelt opened to the community at 4026 28th Avenue South. Upon opening the library's hours were 10 a.m. – 9 p.m., Monday–Friday and 10 a.m. – 1 p.m. on Saturdays. This quote from Theodore Roosevelt was included in Community Bookshelf article on the library, “After the church and the school, the free public library is the most effective influence for good in America.” It went on to state, “We hope we may justify this statement in this new neighborhood, and that the people will use our equipment freely for their enjoyment and education.” The opening day staff were: Ada N. Whiting, Librarian; Eleanor Heimark, First Assistant; Volborg Sobba, Assistant; Lessley Chilson, Assistant; Wallace Petri, Page; Mina Jacobsen, Janitress.

== Later years ==
Roosevelt was open five or six days a week for most of the 20th century. Depending on library funding, it was sometimes open on Saturday and other times closed then. Fluctuations in neighborhood population and the changing demographics of the community also contributed to library usage and open hours. During World War II, librarians at Roosevelt held special story times for the children of the area, many of whom had mothers in the workforce and fathers fighting in the European or Pacific Theater. This helped the children take their minds off the war, and also helped curb rising juvenile delinquency rates in the Standish neighborhood. Throughout the rest of the 20th century, Roosevelt's hours and users remained steady. The library in 1962 decided to experiment with purchasing paperback books for teens. Roosevelt was selected as the pilot location for the paperback project because of its proximity to a high school. In 1973 the building gained a parking lot and air conditioning.

== Outlook 2010 options ==
Roosevelt was small by 1999, as many of the other Minneapolis Public Libraries were 10,000 sq ft (930 m^{2}). or greater. It also lacked a public meeting room and failed to comply with the Americans with Disabilities Act. Voters chose to support the 2000 referendum which gave money to libraries for capital improvements. In a plan drafted July, 1999 called Outlook 2010, there were four options for Roosevelt.

=== Option A ===
Option A had Roosevelt combining with the nearby Nokomis Community Library at an undecided location. The new building would have been 25,000 sq ft (2,300 m^{2}). and both Roosevelt and Nokomis would close. This plan was no longer feasible when Nokomis underwent capital improvements of its own.

=== Option B ===
Option B included Roosevelt moving to a larger building by itself while keeping Nokomis at its current location or moving it separately. In this plan, the new building would be 10,000 sq ft (930 m^{2}).

=== Option C ===
Option C called for major capital improvements to the original Roosevelt building, such as the addition of ramps to make it wheelchair accessible and the replacement of the furnace and water heater.

=== Option D ===
Option D proposed expanding Roosevelt by 5,000 sq ft (460 m^{2}). along with complying it to the Americans with Disabilities Act and expanding the library's collection greatly.

None of the Outlook 2010 plans were undertaken although what eventually was done by Hennepin County Library is sort of a combination of Options C and D. In 1997 the building was recognized as a local historic landmark and on 26 May 2000 Roosevelt was added to the National Register of Historic Places which meaning it could not be destroyed or greatly altered using federal aid without a public hearing.

== Outlook 2010 aftermath ==
In 2002 a new mixed used library (close to option B) at 38th Street and 23rd Avenue was endorsed by the neighborhood advisory team but uncertain economic conditions shelved that project. More plans for renovations were made in 2005 but those were also shelved due to economics.

== Closure, reopening and renovation ==
Due to funding cuts in the early 2000s, Roosevelt closed on all but three days per week. This continued until 2006 when funding cuts became even more drastic. On 29 December 2006 Roosevelt and two other Minneapolis libraries closed amid outcry from patrons and neighbors. During 2007, Minneapolis Public Library drew nearer to the merger with Hennepin County Library, who promised to reopen Roosevelt when and if the merger was approved. It was, and on 3 January 2008 Roosevelt was reopened (three days per week), now as part of the Hennepin County Library System. It closed for renovation in 2012. Roosevelt Library reopened on June 1, 2013 with a new meeting room and completely revitalized interior and mechanical systems. The new library features more public computers, including iPads for patron use within the building, a refreshed collection, a new multi-purpose room, and increased operational efficiencies with one customer service point.
