= Don Celender =

American artist (1931–2005)

- Born: 1931; Sharpsburg, Pennsylvania
- Died: March 3, 2005 (aged 73); Pittsburgh, Pennsylvania
- Education: University of Pittsburgh (PhD); Carnegie Mellon University (B.F.A.)
- Known for: Surveys
- Movement: Conceptual art
- Spouse(s): Ivy Celender (m. mid-1950s; div. 1995)

Don Celender (1931 – March 3, 2005) was an American conceptual artist and professor. Celender, who began producing art in the late 1960s, used surveys extensively in his work. He would send questionnaires to members of the public, academics, artists, politicians, museum officials, and other cohorts of people, often with outlandish or tongue-in-cheek suggestions or solicitations. The responses were then exhibited at the OK Harris Gallery in Manhattan, New York, where Celender had a show annually. Celender taught at Macalester College in Saint Paul, Minnesota, for over 40 years.

== Early life ==
Don Celender was born in 1931 in Sharpsburg, Pennsylvania. He attended Pittsburgh's Carnegie Mellon University, from which he graduated in 1956 with a Bachelor of Fine Arts degree. He then attended the University of Pittsburgh, graduating in 1963 with a PhD in Art History.

== Career ==
After obtaining his PhD, Celender worked in Washington, D.C., at the National Gallery of Art's education department. In 1964, he moved to Minnesota where he began teaching at Macalester College in Saint Paul.

While teaching, Celender took an interest in conceptual art. As the movement was expanding in 1969, Celender began a project in which he wrote letters to various academics, politicians, philanthropists, figures in the media, and religious leaders. The letters contained impossible proposals for the addressees to implement, with the instruction that they write back to Celender explaining how they intended to realize his schemes. He received responses to some of his proposals; the Cleveland Museum of Art's director, Sherman Lee, responded to Celender's suggestion that 1,000 of Lee's museum's pieces of Asian art be airdropped across Alabama by saying that he had "mentally performed" the feat. Other letters, such as Celender's proposal to Alabama governor George Wallace that the state's white residents be painted black, the state's black residents be painted white, and that they all pose as Greek sculptures along the state's highways, went unreturned.

Celender's work began to receive critical attention in the mid-1970s. He exhibited art each year from 1974 to 2004 at the OK Harris Gallery in SoHo, Manhattan. Ivan Karp, owner of the gallery, represented Celender. Celender's pieces often served to parody the self-seriousness and predictability of the world of fine art, and was deemed fun and witty for those reasons. In another letter-writing project, 1975's Museum Piece, he wrote to over 70 museums, soliciting photographs of their loading bays. The museums at Yale University and Princeton University would agree to the project only for a large donation while the Brooklyn Museum, described by art critic Dale Jamieson as "regard[ing] itself as besieged by the community in which it is located", turned down Celender's solicitation on the grounds of "security reasons".

In 1978, Celender produced Observations, Lamentations and Protestations of Museum Guards Throughout the World, a project described by Marc Fischer as "particularly ambitious". Celender mailed 1,200 surveys, many translated from English, to museum guards to solicit their feelings about their work, the artwork in the museums they protected, and their own relationships with art. Also in 1978, Celender created Destiny of a Name, a survey dealing with the notion that a person's name may determine their profession. Celender wrote to, among others, a psychologist with the surname Reveal, a dentist with the surname Toothman, and a colorectal surgeon named Butts.

Although the responses to many of Celender's questionnaires were brief, his 1995 study Mortal Remains, a collaboration with Ricardo Bloch, resulted in lengthier responses. For Mortal Remains, Bloch and Celender asked 400 contemporary artists what they wished to happen to their bodies after death and whether they wished to bring anything with them to the resting place of their choosing.

== Personal life and death ==
Don Celender was married to Ivy Celender from the late 1950s through 1995, when they divorced. Celender had one daughter, Catherine. He taught at Macalester College and headed its art department until January 2005, when he learned he had pancreatic cancer. Celender died on March 3, 2005, in Pittsburgh at the age of 73.

== Works ==
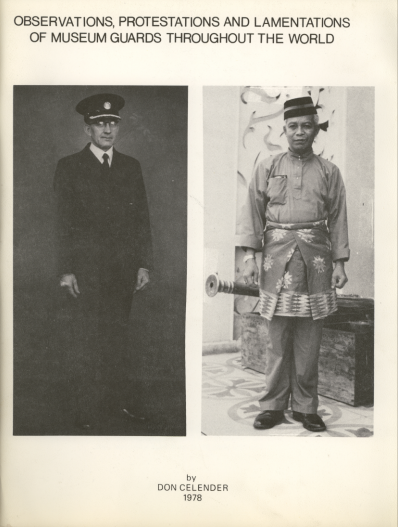
Cover of the bound collection Observations, Protestations and Lamentations of Museum Guards Throughout the World (1978)

Max Kozloff wrote that Celender's lightheartedness as well as the straightforwardness of his projects and their messages made him "an exception in the art world". The majority of his art took the form of survey projects like Museum Piece, which Celender produced annually and exhibited at the OK Harris Gallery. The results of about half of Celender's surveys were bound into book form, printed in black and white on 8.5-by-11-inch (22 cm × 28 cm) paper, though these books are difficult for members of the public to access and are not often found in secondary markets. The archive of the Arnolfini contains a sizable collection of Celender's pieces. Some of Celender's 35 exhibited works are listed below, and those that were bound into book form are indicated with a dagger (†). Unless otherwise noted, all works are referenced to Fischer.

- Wind and Water Chime (1968)
- Artball (1971)
- Political Art Movement, Religious Art Movement, Affluent Art Movement, Academic Art Movement, Corporate Art Movement, Cultural Art Movement, Mass Media Art Movement, Organizational Art Movement (1972)†
- The Olympics of Art (1973)†
- Museum Piece (1975)†
- Opinions of Working People Concerning the Arts (1975)†
- Observation and Scholarship Examination for Art Historians, Museum Directors, Artists, Dealers, and Collectors: Part 2 (1977)†
- Observations, Protestations and Lamentations of Museum Guards Throughout the World (1978)†
- Destiny of a Name (1978)†
- National Architects Preference Survey (1979)†
- Parental Attitudes Survey (1980)
- Reincarnation Study (1982)†
- Unmatched Garage Doors (1982)
- Law Enforcement Officers Art Preference Survey (1988)
- Apprenticeship Study (1989)
- Questions About the Arts You May Never Have Thought to Ask (1992)†
- Aesthetic Experiences (1992)
- Mortal Remains with Ricardo Bloch (1995)†
- Nobel Laureates Art Preference Survey (1995)
- Military Officers Art Survey (1998)
- Small and Unusual Museums Survey (1999)
- Labor Activists Art Preference Survey (2003)
- National Prison Wardens Art Preference Survey (2003)
- Censorship Survey (2003)
