= Longfellow Zoological Gardens =

Zoo and garden in Minnesota

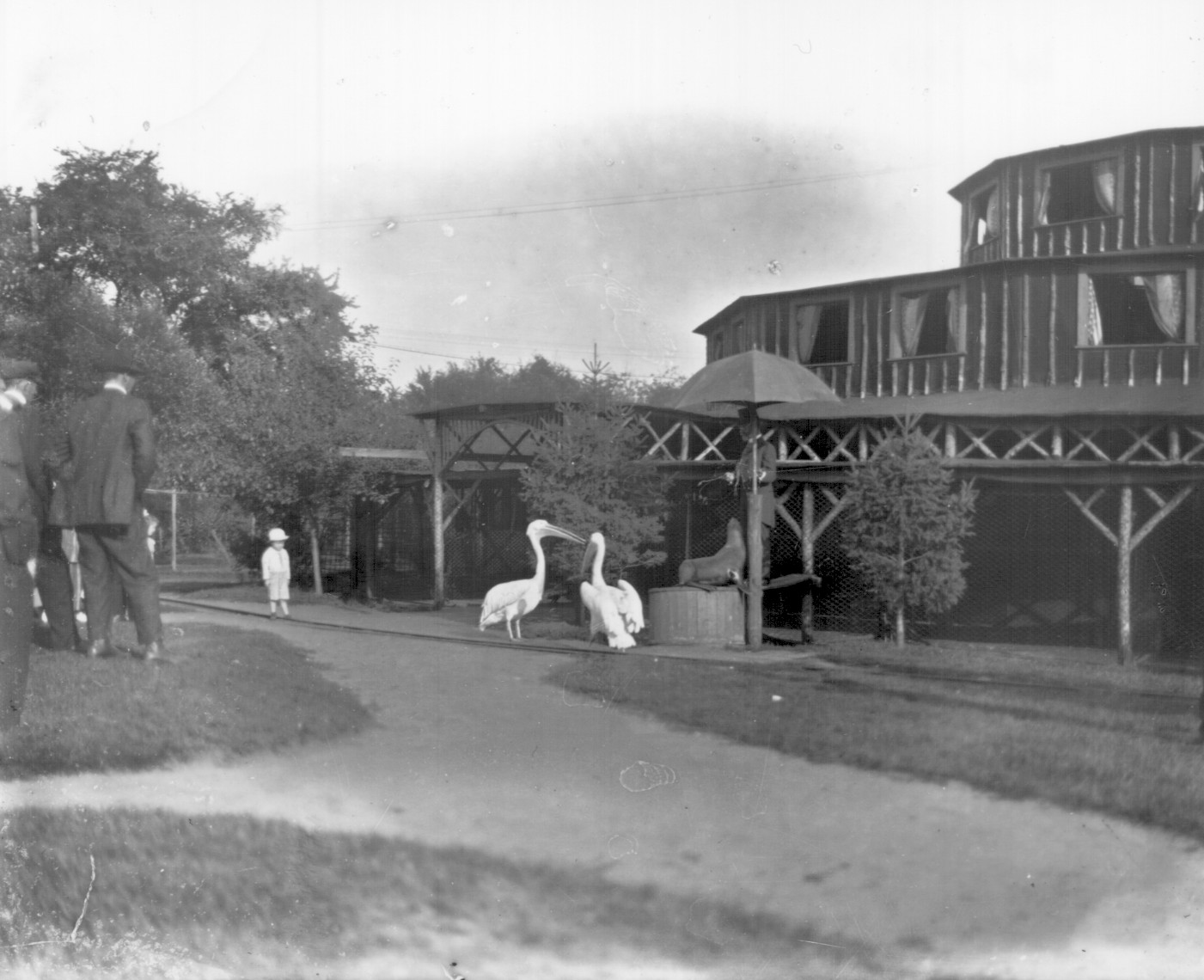
- Jones, center, performs with a seal and two pelicans in 1917 at the Longfellow Gardens
- Interactive map of Longfellow Zoological Gardens
- 44°54′56″N 93°12′53″W
- Date opened: 1906; 120 years ago
- Date closed: 1934; 92 years ago
- Location: Minnehaha in Minnesota, United States

The Longfellow Zoological Gardens (sometimes simply called the Longfellow Gardens) were a zoo and garden in Minneapolis's Minnehaha neighborhood in Minnesota, United States.

== History ==
A Minneapolis businessman and showman named Robert "Fish" Jones first bought a property near the edge of downtown Minneapolis in 1886. He converted the 3-acre (12,000 m^{2}) property into a zoo for the animals which he had collected since his arrival in Minneapolis in 1876. These included lions, jaguars, leopards, bears, cattle and a camel. The number of animals he kept, however, soon grew and Jones was forced to move from the property on Hennepin Avenue to an area in south Minneapolis. Then, in 1906, he opened the zoo to the public. He also built a house styled after the home of poet Henry Wadsworth Longfellow, where he lived for the rest of his life.

In 1908, in a ceremony presided over by Minnesota Representative Frank Nye, Jones and a group of others were honored by a letter from Alice M. Longfellow, the daughter of the poet, noting her wish to some day come and visit the gardens. She never came, however.

== Collection ==
The zoo was popular, and continued to grow as Jones eventually added zebras, monkeys, orangutans and a polar bear which was said to have come from Norway. Jones had a professional trainer to work with the 8 lions, but also on occasion would enter the cage with them himself. In general, his care and affection for the animals was of note. He also had a wide array of birds from the grey crowned crane to the flamingo to the storks. The zoo was also known for its seals. A man-eating tiger, personally captured by animal collector Frank Buck in Johore, was part of the collection.

== Later years ==
The zoo continued to prosper, although complaints from neighbors about noise and smell were perpetual. The zoo continued to draw crowds, however, with intriguing wildlife for adults, and monkeys which were the center point of the zoo for many children.

In 1930, Jones died. His family tried to keep his zoo open, but failed and the zoo had to be closed down. Many of the animals were sold or given the Como Zoo in St. Paul and in 1934, the land where the zoo once stood was given to the Minneapolis Park and Recreation Board. It was rumored that several seals escaped the zoo over the Minnehaha Falls into the nearby creek, although this was never proven.

The land where the zoo once stood is now residential.
