= Nokomis East =

Group of neighborhoods in Minneapolis, Minnesota, United States

Coordinates: 44°54′19″N 93°13′22″W

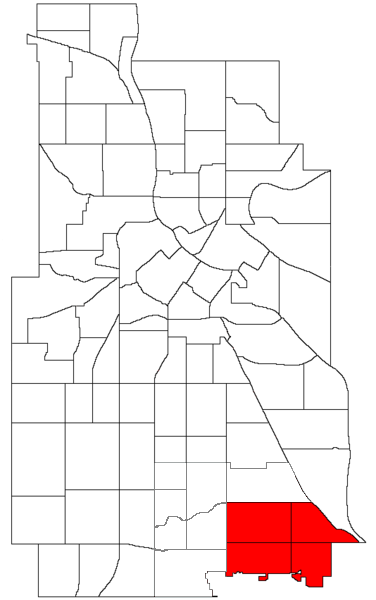
Nokomis East's Location in Minneapolis

Nokomis East is a group of neighborhoods in the southeastern corner of Minneapolis, Minnesota, United States. It consists of four neighborhoods: Keewaydin, Minnehaha, Morris Park, and Wenonah. Nokomis East contains two schools, the Nokomis Community Library, and a post office. On its western edge is Lake Nokomis, for which it is named. Two regional parks (Minnehaha and Lake Nokomis), and three neighborhood parks (Keewaydin, Bossen Field, and Morris Park) provide recreation and educational programming for all age groups. Seven churches serve residents of various denominations. Nokomis East is served by the Nokomis East Neighborhood Association (NENA). The main transportation corridors are the neighborhood boundaries: Cedar Avenue, 34th and 28th Avenues, 50th and 54th Streets, Highway 55 (Hiawatha Avenue), and Crosstown highway 62.

== History ==
Until 1880, an American Indian Village was between Lake Nokomis and Lake Hiawatha in the vicinity of the current Nokomis Community Center. Rail transit and a depot were established near the neighborhood as early as 1865.

== Nokomis East Neighborhood Association ==
Nokomis East Neighborhood Association
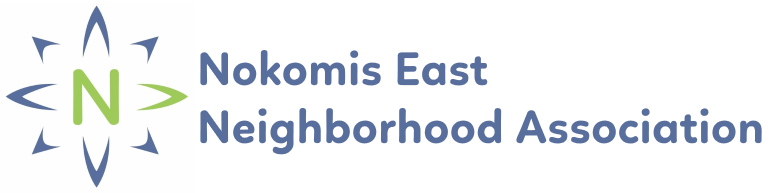
- Abbreviation: NENA
- Location: 4313 East 54th Street Minneapolis, MN 55417
- Staff: 2
- Website: Official website

The Nokomis East Neighborhood Association (NENA) is a neighborhood association that serves the Nokomis East neighborhoods of South Minneapolis. It is led by a 15-member board of directors drawn from the neighborhoods. The current chair of NENA is Jerome Evans.

=== History ===
Nokomis East Neighborhood was established in about 1988 with the goal of revitalizing and improving the neighborhood. In 1998, the association voted and was approved to be the recipient of Nokomis East's Neighborhood Revitalization Program (NRP) funds.

The neighborhood association has been responsible for many different projects and programs ranging from neighborhood planning to environment to housing to safety. These have included a commercial facade improvement program, tree planting along the Minnehaha Creek and Lake Nokomis, Earth Day cleanups of greenspaces, and the distribution of Children First grants.

NENA has two paid employees. The rest of the organization is made up of volunteers who live or work in the neighborhood. This includes the association's many committees, which each focus on different areas for improvement. A board oversees the operations of the group. In October 2014, the organization's two staff members were laid off. After a "transitional year" in 2015 when a new executive director, a program and communications manager, and a community organizer were hired, NENA moved its offices. The owners of the building at 3000 East 50th Street, where the offices had been housed for 21 years, sold it, and NENA moved to an office near the corner of 54th Street and 43rd Avenue South.

=== Events ===
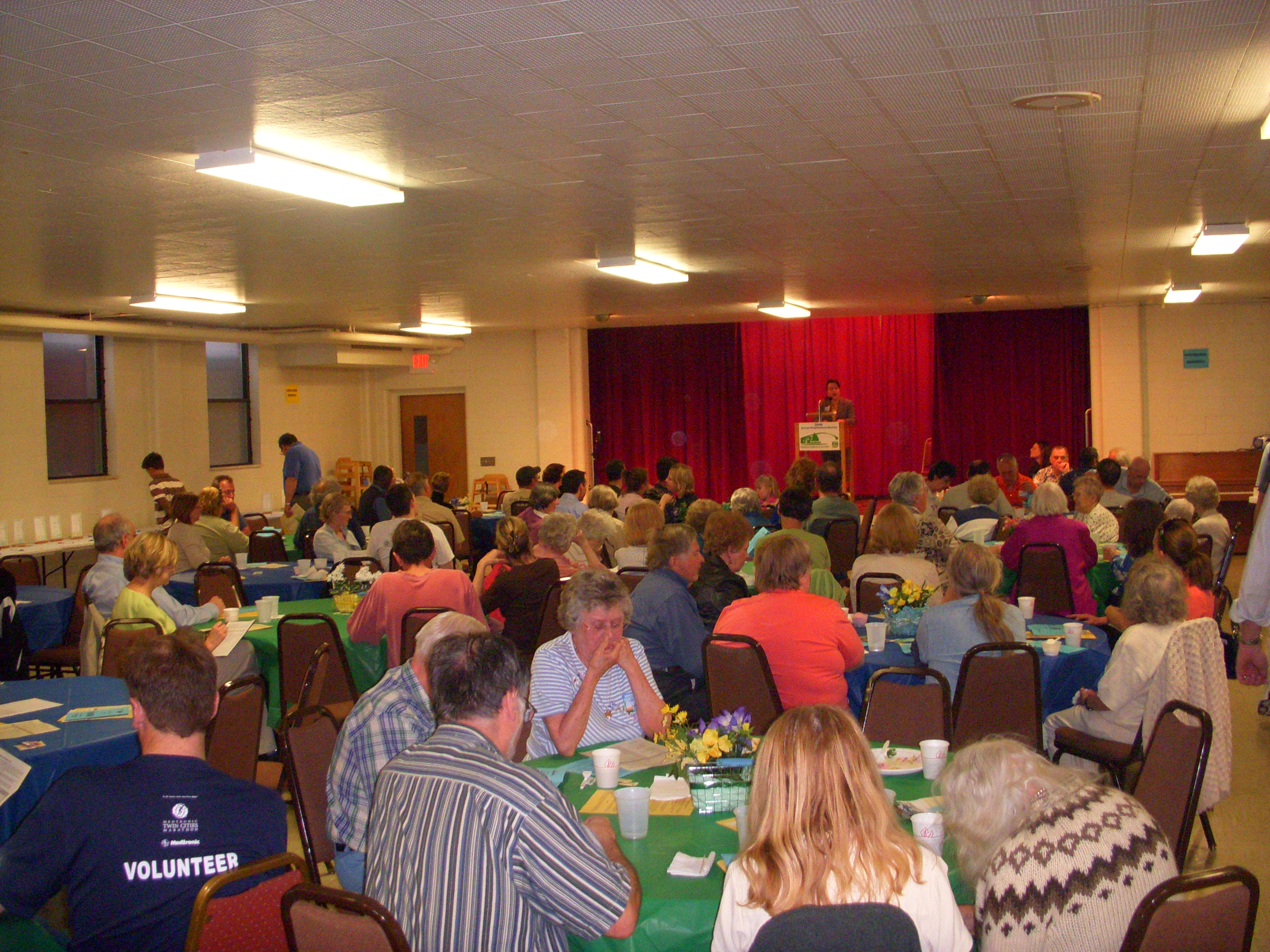
May 2008 neighborhood meeting

NENA hosts six to ten town meetings per year. These have included meetings with property developers and discussions about significant neighborhood happenings, such as the renovation of the Nokomis Library. In April or May, the NENA usually hosts a neighborhood meeting to update the public on its affairs and those of the neighborhood, and deliver its annual report. The 2008 neighborhood meeting featured state senator Patricia Torres Ray as the keynote speaker.

On December 30, NENA holds a Night Before New Year's Eve Celebration with family games, music, craftsM and horse-drawn hayrides. New Year's is celebrated at 8 p.m. instead of midnight.

=== April Fools' ===
Every April Fools' Day, fictitious stories written as news articles are posted on the association's website. Usually they involve local topics, such as the METRO Blue Line or Lake Nokomis. One such story, released in 2006, said that bull sharks had been pushed up the Mississippi River and into Minnehaha Creek after hurricanes Katrina and Rita. The story was picked up by online forums, websites and word of mouth, and at one point was averaging almost 1,000 views a day.
