= Longfellow House =

Historic home in Minnesota

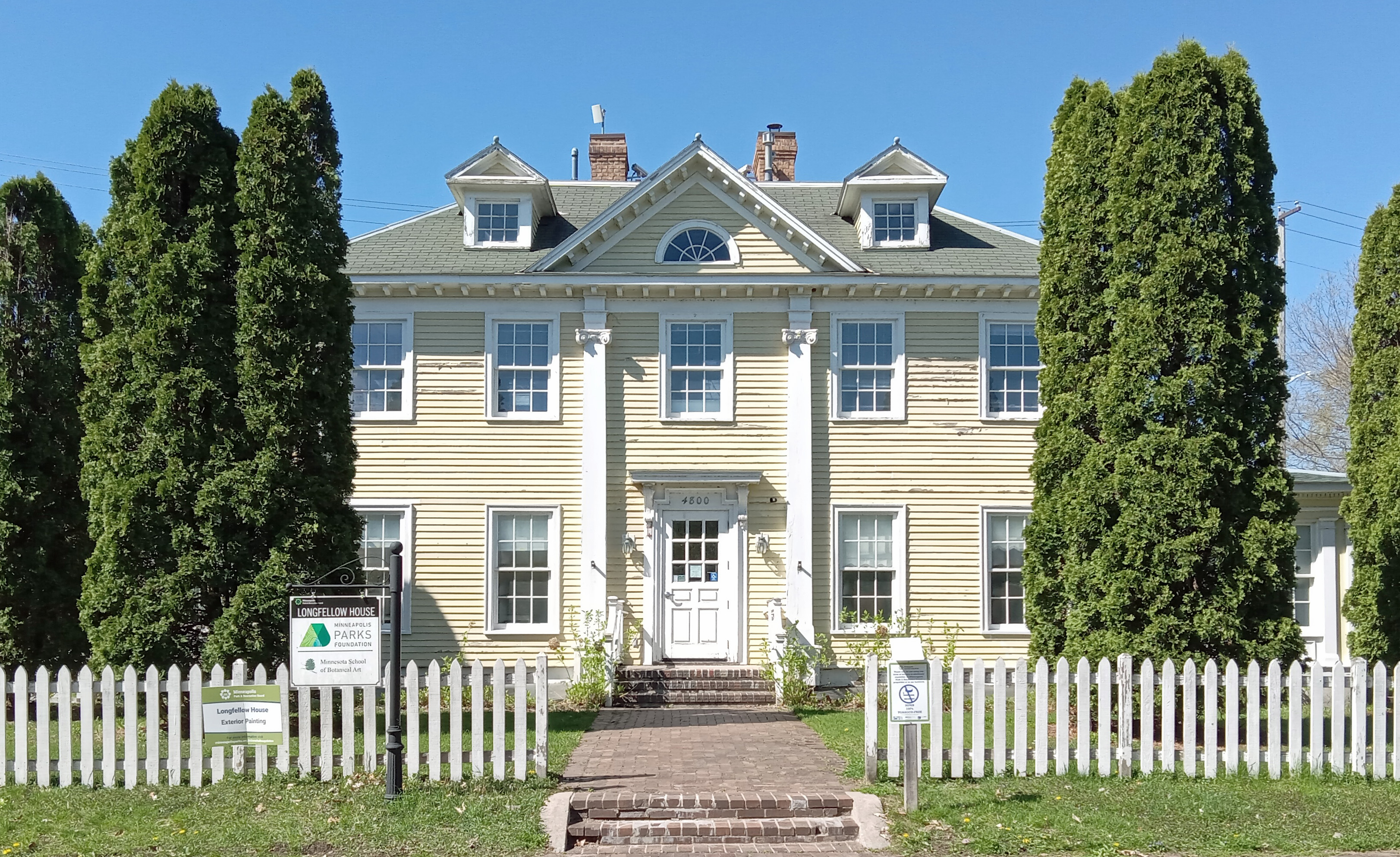
- The Longfellow House from the northeast
- Interactive map of the Longfellow House area
- Former names: Henry Wadsworth Longfellow House

General information
- Type: House
- Architectural style: Colonial
- Location: Minneapolis, Minnesota, 4800 S. Minnehaha Drive
- Coordinates: 44°54′57.5″N 93°12′49.5″W
- Current tenants: Park Board Interpretive Center
- Construction started: 1906
- Completed: 1907
- Owner: Minneapolis Park and Recreation Board

Technical details
- Floor count: 3

Design and construction
- Architect: Robert "Fish" Jones

The Longfellow House in Minneapolis, Minnesota, United States, is a 2/3-scale replica of Henry Wadsworth Longfellow's home in Cambridge, Massachusetts. Built in 1907, the house was neither seen nor lived in by Longfellow (who died in 1882), but was the home of an admiring Minneapolis businessman named Robert "Fish" Jones. Longfellow House stands within Minnehaha Park and is a contributing property to the Minnehaha Historic District.

== Early history ==
In 1885, Robert "Fish" Jones sold his downtown Minneapolis fish market, and built a zoo on the site where the Basilica of St. Mary stands today. He eventually moved his zoo a few miles south into an area next to Minnehaha Creek. He rebuilt his zoo, the Longfellow Zoological Gardens, and opened it in 1907. At the same time, he built a house for himself, styled after Henry Wadsworth Longfellow's home. A yellow frame house with porches at each end, he lived there for the next 23 years until he closed the zoo, due to complaints from nearby residents. He agreed to give the house to the City of Minneapolis, but died in 1930 before the transaction was completed.

== Longfellow Community Library ==
For four years after Jones' death, the house remained vacant, following which the Park Board was deeded the house, offering it to the Minneapolis Public Library. The library purchased it for $1,500, $500 of which was raised by neighbourhood residents. The Works Progress Administration converted the house into the Longfellow Community Library, which opened in 1937.

The library performed well, serving the south easternmost portion of Minneapolis until the 1950s, when the growing prevalence of television cut circulation numbers at the library in half. The demographic that fell the most during that time was not children, but adults. The library overcame this circulation drop, so much so that in 1967 the Library Board authorized the construction of a new library in the nearby Wenonah neighborhood. In 1968, Longfellow closed and Nokomis Community Library opened, instantly doubling Longfellow's circulation numbers.

== The House today ==
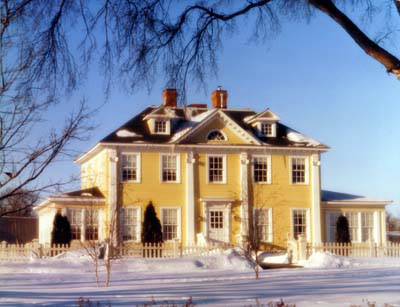
The Longfellow House in 2003

The House fell into disrepair. During the early 1980s, it was used by the March of Dimes and Minneapolis Jaycees as "Ghost Manor", a haunted house attraction every year at Halloween. In 1994, the expansion of Hiawatha Avenue was underway, the House was moved to its current location. In a partnership with the Minnesota Department of Transportation, the house was moved across the highway by Ernst Movers of Osseo, Minnesota and thus reconnected with Minnehaha Park which the house had been separated from. It was then renovated by the Kodet Architectural Group. The moving process won the Department of Transportation an honorable mention by the Federal Highway Administration in the historic preservation category. In 2001, the house opened as an interpretive information center, run by the Park Board.
