= Washburn Library =

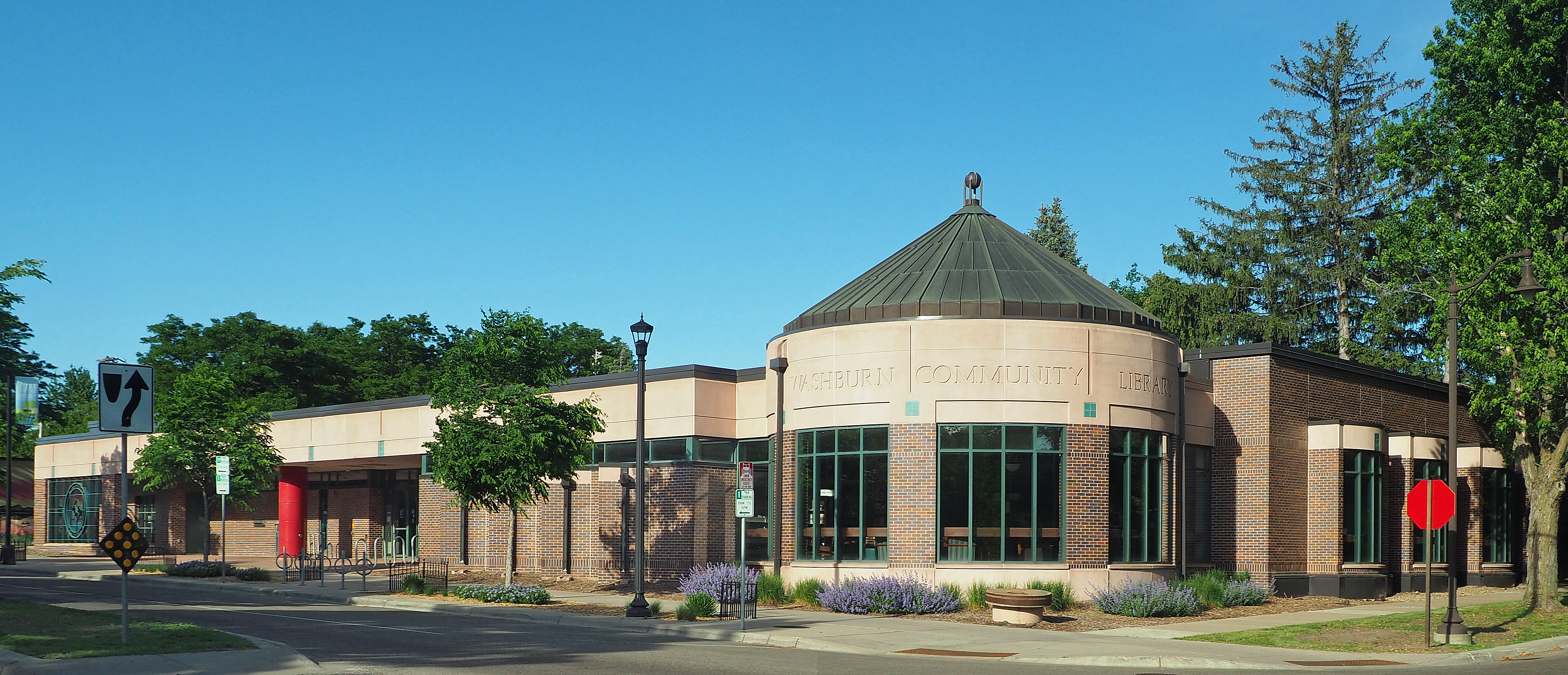
- Washburn Library viewed from the northeast
- Former names: Washburn Community Library

General information
- Type: Branch library
- Location: 5244 Lyndale Avenue South, Minneapolis, Minnesota
- Coordinates: 44°54′26″N 93°17′19″W
- Opened: September 1970
- Renovated: 1990
- Owner: Hennepin County Library

Technical details
- Floor area: 18,965 square feet (1,762 m^{2})

Design and construction
- Architect: Brooks Cavin

Renovating team
- Renovating firm: Leonard Parker and Associates

Washburn Library, formerly known as Washburn Community Library, is a public library that is part of the Hennepin County Library system. It is located in Southwest Minneapolis, near Minnehaha Creek. The library is named after William D. Washburn, a founder of the Washburn-Crosby Company (now known as General Mills) and a former United States Senator from Minnesota. Washburn Library features public art, including a millstone that honors Minneapolis's history as a center for grain milling during the 19th and 20th centuries.

The Washburn Library opened its doors in September 1970 and is located at 5244 Lyndale Avenue South in Minneapolis. Initially, the library spanned an area of 14,451 square feet (1,342.5 m²) and housed approximately 18,000 books. The building was designed by architect Brooks Cavin, who studied under Walter Gropius and Eero Saarinen, highlighting a mid-century modern design style.

Patron traffic at the Washburn Library quickly increased, breaking previous records. To accommodate the growing demand, library staff requested that materials be shared from other branches. Phonograph albums and children's books proved to be particularly popular. In its first year of operation, Washburn circulated 273,000 books, making it the most successful branch of the Minneapolis Public Library at that time.

== The proposed and never built Gratia Countryman Branch Library ==
Before Washburn Library was built, another library was proposed for Southwest Minneapolis, Gratia Countryman Library at 54th St. and Penn Ave.

In 1959 the Minneapolis Public Library Board requested the City Council to acquire by condemnation a site for the new Gratia Countryman Branch Library. The desired land was in southwest Minneapolis in the vicinity of 54th St W. and Penn Ave S.

The proposed library was to be the first neighborhood library built by MPL since 1931, when the Linden Hills branch was built. It would serve an area of about 30,000 residents, who were currently accessing library services via the bookmobile and at the nearest branch, the Linden Hills library, several miles away. The Countryman library was also scheduled to be the first in an ambitious 20-year branch expansion program which would extend library services to areas of the city not already served.

The site for the proposed Gratia Countryman Library was selected due to the lack of library service in an area with prodigious growth. Bookmobiles were unable to meet the demand for books and information. In a library survey, MPL found that 37,373 books were circulated by bookmobiles throughout the proposed area during the period from January 1 to June 30, 1960. The new proposed branch would house 30,000 books, 100 periodicals, and more than 5,000 pamphlets and clippings.

The proposed 14,000 sq. ft. building was estimated to cost $327,000 for construction, planning, site, and equipment. The library selected Graffunder-Nagle & Associates, Inc. to design the structure. Preliminary plans were approved by the library board in November, 1960.

But this is where the plans ended. The legislature passed funding for the separate Hennepin County Library system in order to serve the growing suburban population, but rejected plans for growth in the city system. MPL struggled financially and lacked sufficient funds to continue its 20-year branch expansion program. The proposed Gratia Countryman Library was put on hold and then dropped. In June, 1966, the Library Board voted to offer for sale the library property at 54th St. and Penn Ave S. for a minimum price of $37,500. The property was sold in 1969 for $18,400.

The desire to honor Gratia Countryman by naming a library after her continued. In 1984, the Library Board discussed the renaming of North Regional Library and in 2000, East Lake Library was suggested.

== Updates to the library ==
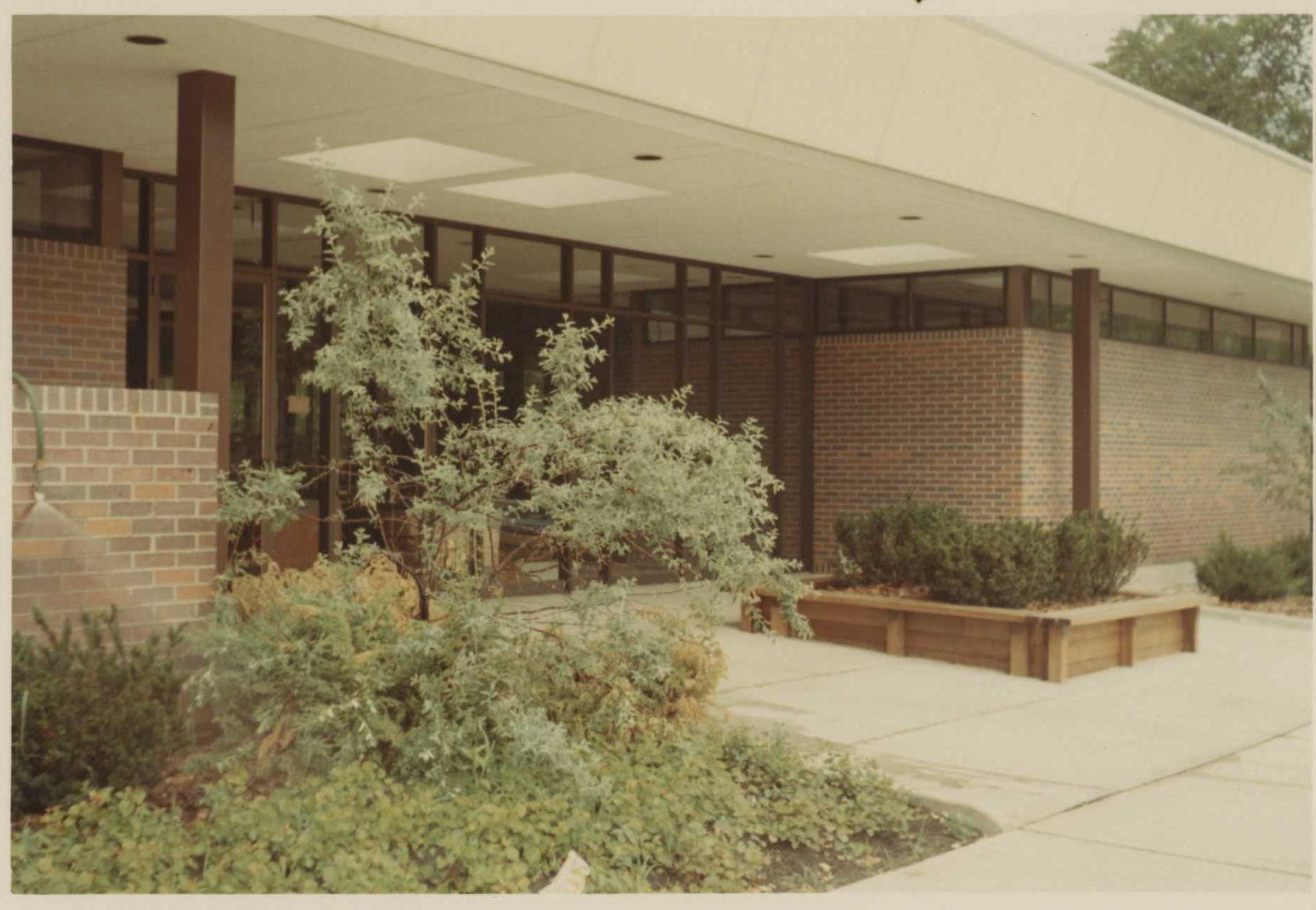
Washburn Library soon after opening in 1970

Approaching its 20th anniversary in 1989, the Washburn branch needed to be expanded and updated to meet patrons' needs. The community it served had expanded, including more children living in the neighborhoods, and demand was bustling for materials. In fact, it was the busiest of Minneapolis's 14 neighborhood branch libraries.

In 1990, Minneapolis Public Library leadership determined that the library was in need of significant remodeling and approved an expanded footprint of 18,965 square feet, a 28% increase. In serving the neighborhoods of Lynnhurst, Kenny, Armatage, Tangletown, Windom, Field, Page, Hale and Diamond Lake, it was noted in particular that significant after-school use by children warranted improving services and spaces for their use. The space needed to better meet the needs of the community's patrons: deferred maintenance needed to be performed on the building, and technology upgrades were overdue. Leonard Parker and Associates were chosen to develop the plans.

In 2014, a six-week long update to the building resulted in an open floor plan, more space for children and teens, new furniture and shelves, including technology tables for the public computers, and more electrical outlets for powering portable electronics.

== Art at the library ==
Joining the millstone in the external landscape, the update to the Washburn added a sculpture by Ann Wolfe, Mother and Child, and a large and bright whimsical mural by Virginia Bradley on the domed ceiling above the children's area.
