= East Lake Library =

- East Lake Branch Library
- U.S. National Register of Historic Places
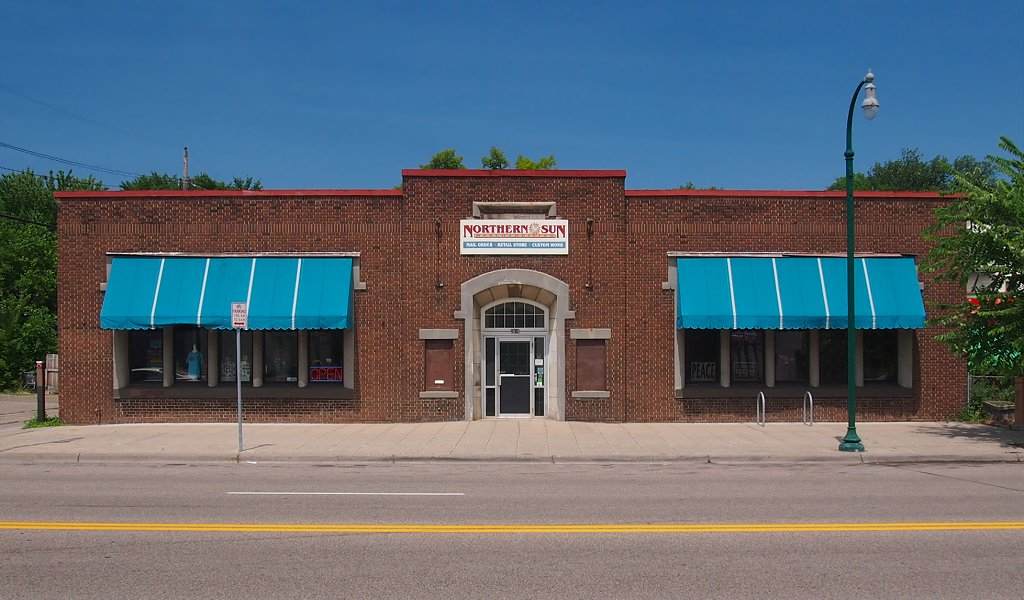
- The first East Lake Branch Library, now a store

- Location within Minnesota Location within the United States
- Location: 2916 East Lake Street; Minneapolis, Minnesota
- Coordinates: 44°56′56″N 93°13′44″W
- NRHP reference No.: 00000542
- Added to NRHP: May 26, 2000

East Lake Library is one of 41 branch libraries in the Hennepin County Library System, one of 15 branch libraries formerly in the Minneapolis Public Library System in Minneapolis, Minnesota, United States. Three different buildings have housed the library since 1924.

== Buildings ==
=== First ===
The first East Lake Community Library opened in February 1924, between the Hosmer Community Library and Roosevelt Community Library, which is modeled closely after East Lake. Situated on Lake Street, it featured simple architecture and a skylight. Because of its appearance, seemingly like a storefront, the library was called a 'Reading Factory'. East Lake was one of the last libraries built in a library 'building boom' that Minneapolis experienced starting in 1905 and ending in 1937.

The first East Lake remained until the mid-1970s when the need for a new, larger library grew. By 1974 East Lake was circulating 121,459 items and fielding tens of thousands of reference questions. In 1976 the library closed and was reopened as a Montessori day care. In 1987 Northern Sun Merchandising purchased the building and runs it there to this day. In 2000 the building was added to the National Register of Historic Places. In 2004–5, 80 solar panels (9.6 kW) were installed on the roof. The original library shelves still circle the walls of the building.

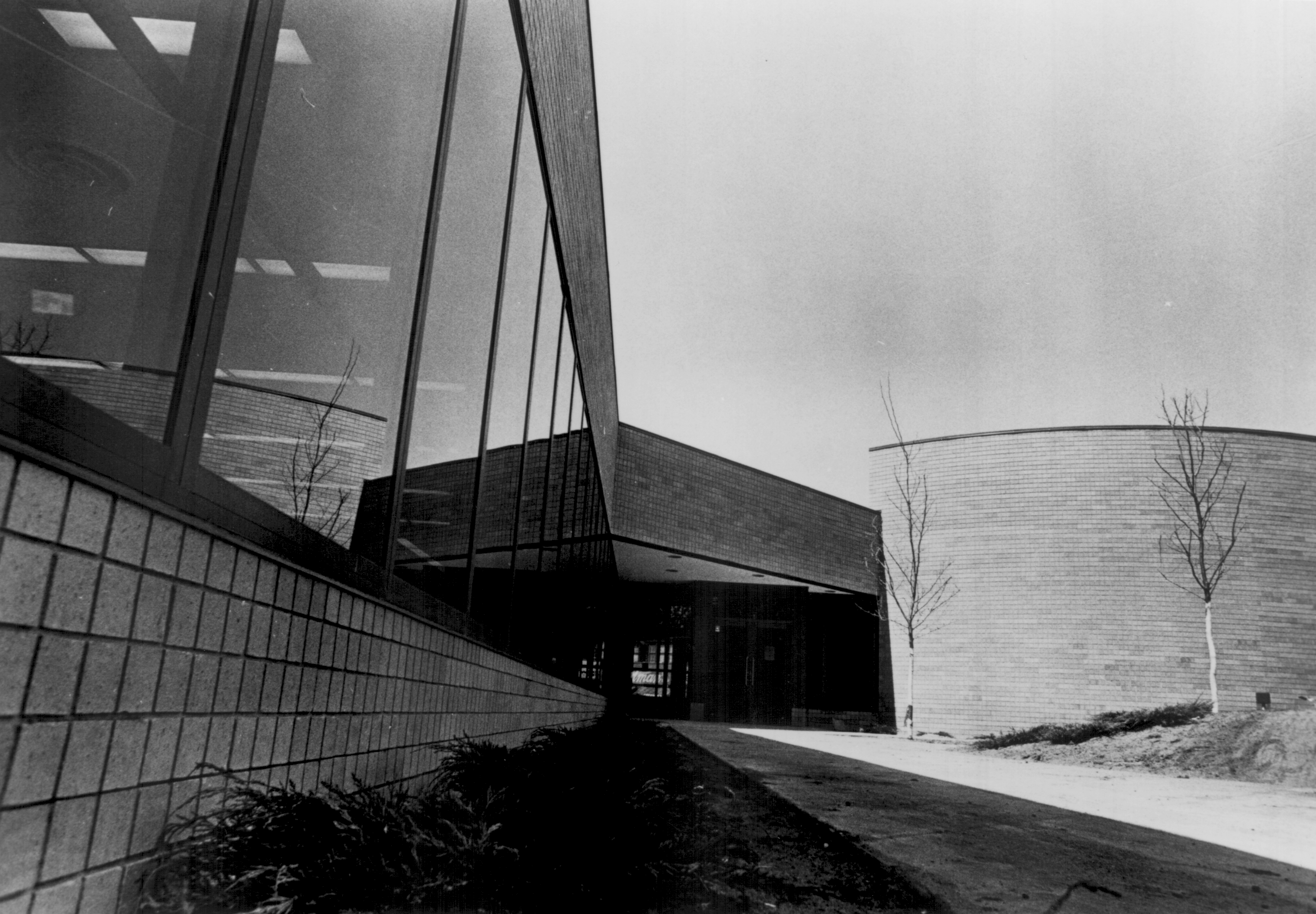
East Lake Library, 1976

=== Second ===
The second East Lake was built two blocks west of the original library. It had 15,116 square feet (1,404 m^{2}) of space and 30,000 volumes. It also had a 2,390 square feet (222 m^{2}) meeting room. The building was built by the Minnehaha Mall which included a Target and SuperValu store, and helped bring growth to the area. It served patrons of the Longfellow and Phillips neighborhoods well (second in circulation numbers to only Washburn Library), although by around the start of the 21st century, the building was beginning to show wear.

In 1999, a plan called Outlook Twenty Ten outlined some options for the renewal of the library:

- Option A called for a 6,000 square feet (557 m^{2}) expansion to the building, which was to cost almost $3 million.
- Option B outlined a 7,000 square feet (650 m^{2}) expansion and the acquisition of neighboring properties. This was to allow greater creative flexibility in the designation of a new library building. It was to cost almost $3 million.
- Option C simply had the library repaired and slightly renovated. No cost was projected.

None of Outlook Twenty Ten's original suggestions were followed, and on April 30, 2005, the second East Lake was closed to make way for the third building.

=== Third ===
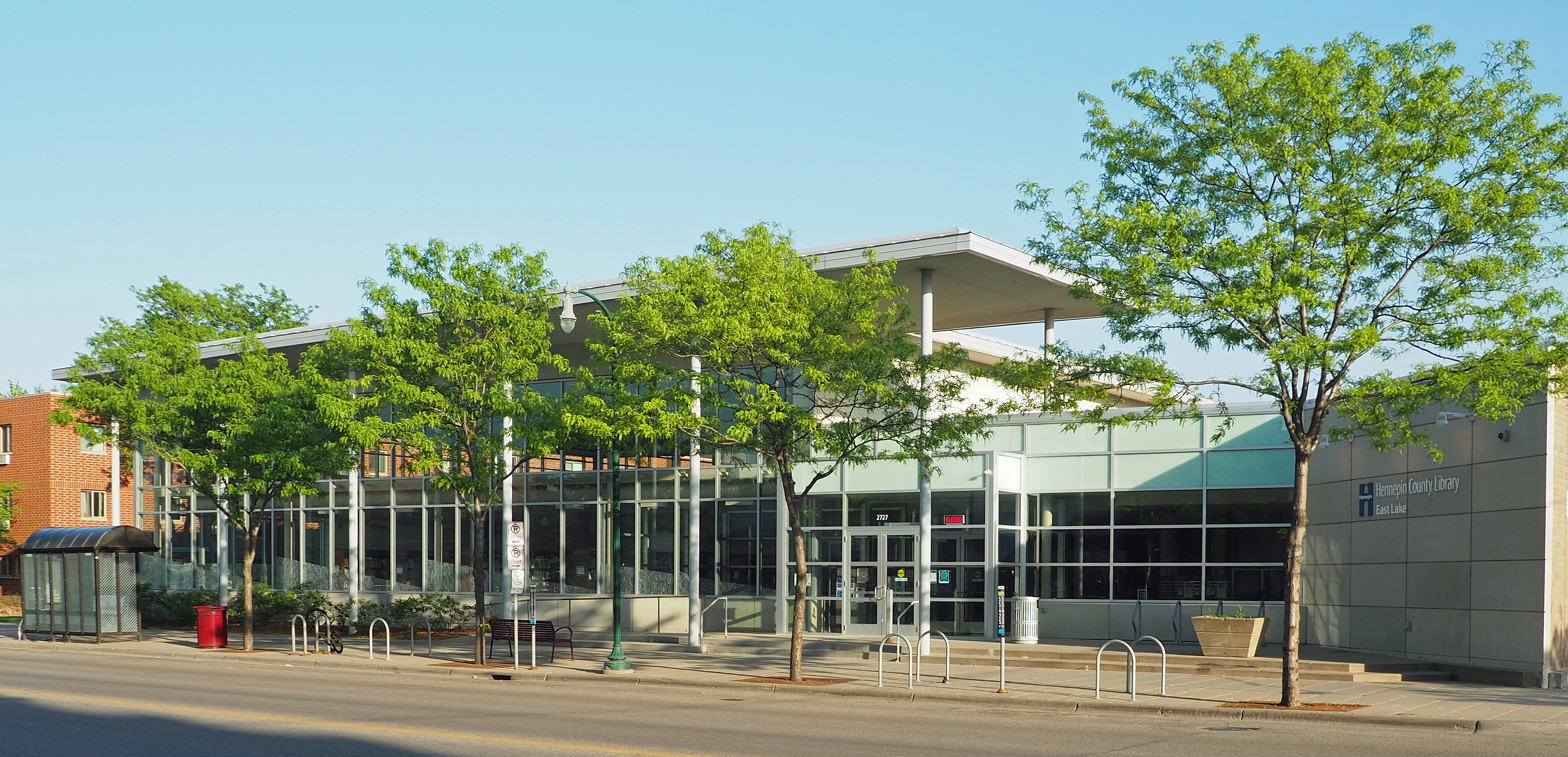
The third incarnation of East Lake library, 2019

The current East Lake was modeled after Minneapolis Central Library, which was also under construction at the time. The new East Lake facility features a glass and metal exterior and was designed by KKE Architects. It was the first green branch library in the MPL system.

The library opened on March 10, 2007. It includes a meeting room, children's area, computers, a zine collection, and fully automated checkout systems. It is located in the same place as the 1976 building, 2727 E. Lake Street.

The library building was damaged by smoke and water from arson that occurred during the overnight hours of May 27, 2020, during the George Floyd protests in Minneapolis–Saint Paul.

== Programs ==
K-12 Homework Help is a free after-school program for students in the neighborhood. East Lake also hosts a monthly Mystery Book Club, a weekly Weekly Art + Craft Practice Group, and regular visits by nonprofit and government agencies offering social supports and career services.

== Works of art ==
East Lake Library art includes Zoran Mojsilov's 2007 piece Zoomorphy, presenting large granite rocks held in place by sinuous steel rods. Weighing 26,000 pounds, Zoomorphy is located in the external rain garden. Visitors looking through the library's external windows encounter Janet Lofquist's Pages, featuring etched glass versions of literary excerpts from Dr. Seuss's Cat in the Hat, Galileo Galilei's work, and Miguel de Cervantes's Don Quixote.
