= Como Zoo =

Zoo in Saint Paul, Minnesota, United States

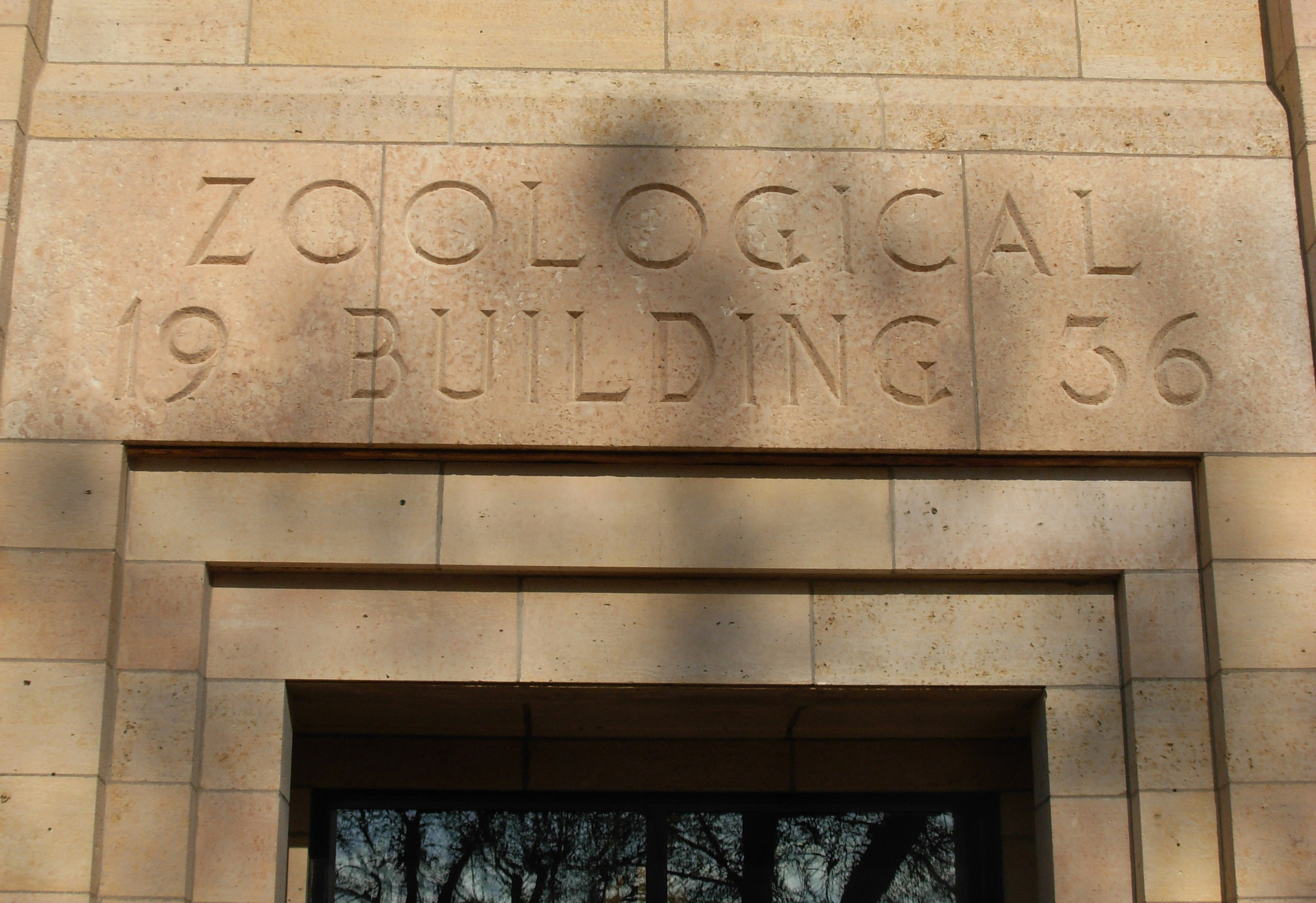
- 1936 Como Zoo Zoological Building
- Interactive map of Como Zoo
- 44°58′56″N 93°9′14″W
- Date opened: 1897
- Location: Saint Paul, Minnesota, United States
- Land area: 17 acres (6.9 ha)
- No. of animals: 1,700
- No. of species: 66
- Annual visitors: 1.9 million
- Memberships: AZA
- Public transit: Metro Transit
- Website: comozooconservatory.org

Como Zoo was the first zoo established in Minnesota. Founded in 1897, when the then mayor of Saint Paul wanted a place for his deer to live. The zoo is located within Como Park, in Saint Paul, Minnesota. Como Zoo is a member of the Association of Zoos and Aquariums (AZA).

== History ==
Early years

Como Zoo was founded in 1897 when the city of Saint Paul received a donation of three deer and provided a simple fenced in pasture for the animals.

In 1902, the animal collection at Como Zoo was expanded to include animals native to Minnesota such as elk, moose, foxes, and two cebus cattle. The zoo also received donations of pets, such as a parrot, two Mexican red birds and a monkey.

In 1915, the zoo received a donation of two bison from the future Lieutenant Governor of Minnesota Thomas Frankson. Also, in 1915, the Como Park's Marjorie McNeely Conservatory was built. The conservatory was used as a warm winter home for the animals.

In 1926, Como Zoo received the donation of an American black bear named Peggy. Her cage was built out of old iron arches already at the zoo.

The 1930s brought exotic animals to the zoo. Monkey Island was built in 1932, followed by the bear grottos, and the Main Zoological building in 1936. Along with these changes came many exotic animals from the Longfellow Gardens zoo, which closed in 1934.

In the 1940s, the zoo expanded once again to include paved parking lots, a Kiddie Zoo, and a raccoon pit which later became prairie dog hill.

1950s

The 1950s brought even more changes to the zoo including Rabbitville which later was expanded into a Children's Farm Zoo. In 1955, the city officials recommended the closing of Como Zoo because the zoo and city did not have the funds to support the zoo. Soon after a Citizen Volunteer Committee was formed to help save the zoo. In 1956, through the efforts of a rich Minnesotan business man, Archie Brand's Seal Show arrived at the zoo. Along with this many repairs were brought to the zoo, which brought new animals such as ostriches, jaguars, seals, llamas, baboons and monkeys. In 1957, a number of endangered animals joined the zoo including Siberian tigers, gorillas, and orangutans. In 1958, Toby, a Galápagos tortoise comes to live at the zoo. Small children were allowed to ride on Toby's back. Also, in 1958, the first Siberian tigers to be raised successfully in captivity were born at Como Zoo. In 1959, Casey the gorilla arrived at the Como Zoo and the Como Mobile Zoo started visiting local schools.

1960s and 1970s

The 1960s brought what seemed to be the end of Como Zoo. In 1966, the Metropolitan Zoo Report of the Citizen's League decided that Como Zoo could not become a major zoo facility, so planning for the Minnesota Zoo began. With this, many people thought that Como Zoo would close, but, in 1969, the zoo built its original primate house where the one now stands, and brought in two new lowland gorillas named Don and Donna. In 1969, the zoo was saved once again by citizens who rallied to raise funds for the zoo.

In January 1972, zoo keepers were forced to shoot Whitey, a male polar bear, to save a midnight visitor who fell into the bear grotto. In 1974, the zoo's favorite Galapagos tortoise, Toby, was moved to the Honolulu Zoo, where he still lives today. In 1976, a new Master Plan was developed to revitalize the zoo, and the State Legislature granted the zoo $8.5 million for the redevelopment process.

1980s

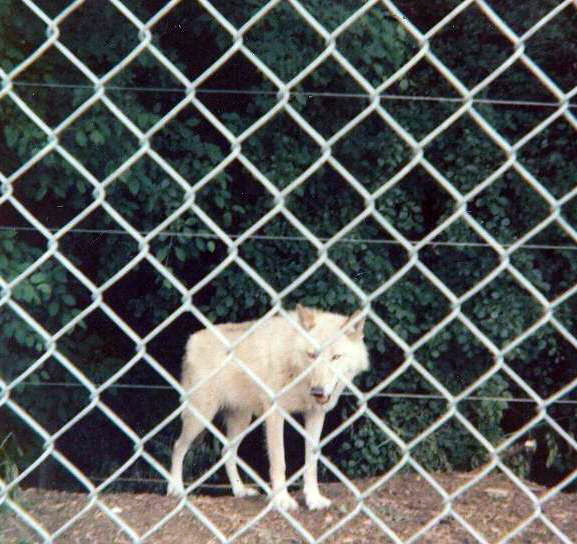
Wolf exhibit, June 1980

The 1980s marked the beginning of new buildings at the zoo, which started in 1980 with the opening of the Large Cats exhibit. In 1982, the zoo opened its new Aquatic Animal building to the public. Other additions included a new polar bear exhibit, a new show amphitheater for the Sparky the Sea Lion Show, and the conversion of Monkey Island to Seal Island. Along with this came Casey II, the grandson of the Como's original Casey from Gladys Porter Zoo in Brownsville, Texas. In 1985, Como Zoo's Primate House was rebuilt, housing gorillas, orangutans, lemurs, monkeys, and tamarins. In 1986, the new Land Bird and Water Fowl exhibit was completed with a large outdoor pool and waterfall. In 1988, the African Hoof Stock exhibit, the final exhibit from the zoo's 1970s master plan, was completed; it contained giraffes, zebras, ostriches, and two types of antelope.

1990s

In 1994, Don, the gorilla, died and Casey II jumped out of his exhibit and took a short stroll in the park before jumping back into his enclosure. With this, came plans for a new and improved gorilla exhibit which made the walls straight up and down instead of slanted. Casey II was later moved to the Audubon Zoo in New Orleans.

2000s and 2010s

In 2008, the zoo's giraffes had a baby. The baby had some problems walking and almost died before it was moved to the University of Minnesota for special treatment. The baby giraffe was returned to the zoo and went on exhibit with its parents. Also, the building of the new Polar Bear Odyssey started removing the old bear grottoes to make a polar bear exhibit seven times larger than the original.

The opening of the Polar Bear Odyssey marked the start of the 2010s decade. In 2011, Polar Bear Odyssey temporarily welcomed 3 grizzly bears that had to be evacuated from the Roosevelt Park Zoo due to flooding. Gorilla Forest opened in 2013. It is home to Schroeder, a 500-pound silverback male, 3 female companions for him, 2 daughters who were born to the females, and a bachelor group of three other males.

Past Exhibits

Permanent exhibits at the zoo that have been replaced over the years include Prairie Dog Hill, The Raccoon Pit, Monkey Island, Rabbitville, Children's Farm Zoo, Kiddie Zoo, Deer Pasture, Seal Island, and the 1936 Zoological Building.

== Exhibits ==
=== Bird Yard Exhibit ===
The bird yard is the first thing visitors of the zoo see after they leave the visitor center. The bird yard contains a large pool, waterfall, and a mill house with a water wheel. The exhibit has large rocks separating the birds from two large galapagos tortoises. Animals in the exhibit include Chilean flamingos, Galápagos tortoises, and mallard ducks.

=== Primate House ===
The first Como Zoo primate house was built in 1969 and was rebuilt in 1985. The Gorilla Forest is the largest all mesh gorilla enclosure in North America. Animals in this exhibited include, blue-eyed lemurs, patas monkeys, emperor tamarins, golden-headed lion tamarins, spider monkeys, western lowland gorillas, Sumatran orangutans, white-faced sakis, and Hoffmann's two-toed sloths.

=== Large Cats Exhibit ===
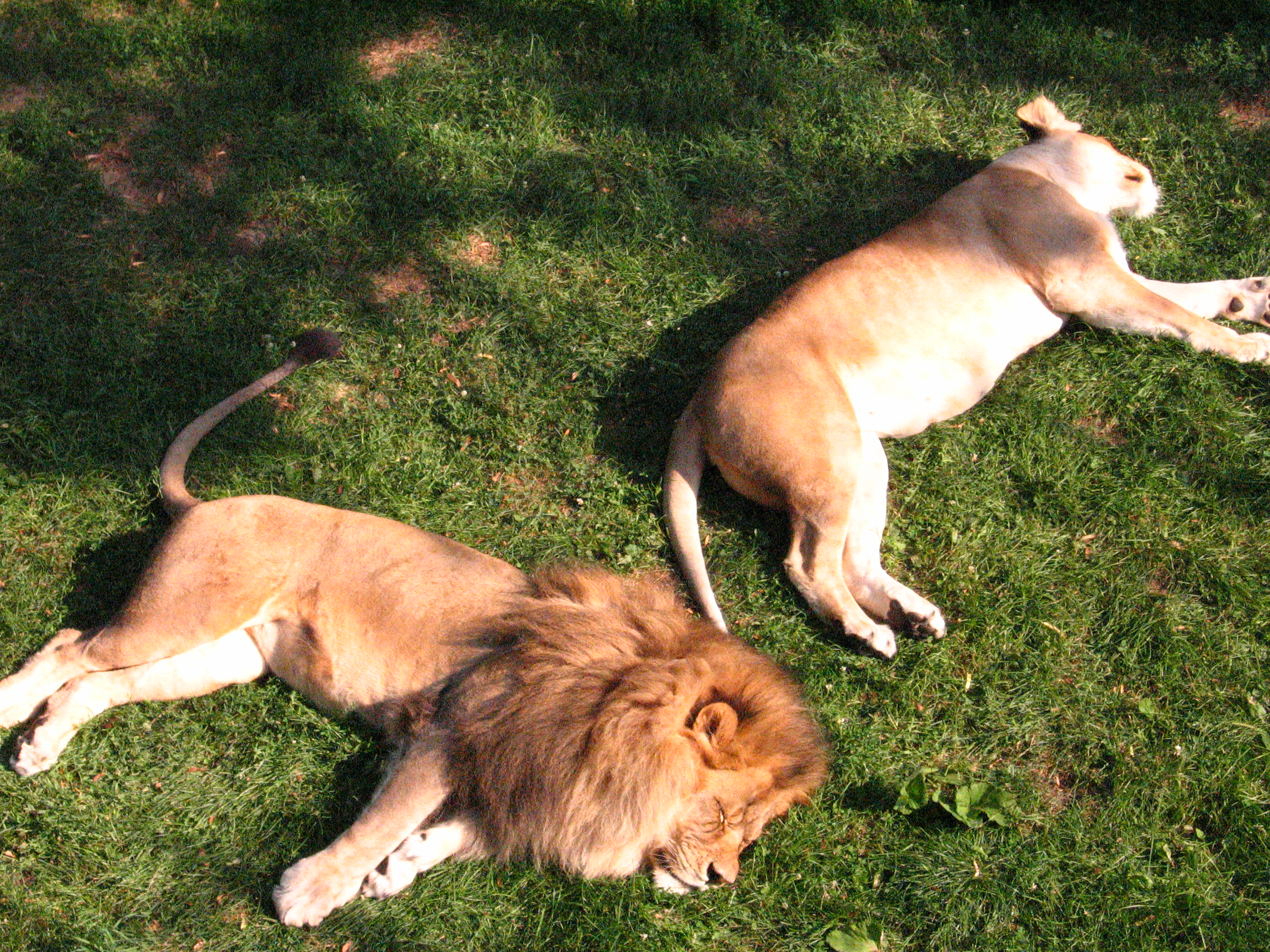
Lions napping at the Como Zoo.

The large cats exhibit was finished in 1980 and moved the large cats out of the small, original zoological building into larger enclosures. Cats in this exhibit include, Siberian tigers, lions, snow leopards and cougars.

=== Aquatic Building ===
The Aquatic Building was built in 1982, and is home to African penguins, tufted puffins, pufferfish, and African cichlids.

=== Como Harbor ===
Como Harbor opened in 2021 and is home to harbor seals, gray seals, and California sea lions.

==== Sparky Show ====
The sparky show is an educational show featuring Sparky the sea lion. The show runs most days and has been running since 1956. The show focusses on educating visitors on marine life conservation, sea lion behavior, and the training and tricks performed by Sparky. Over the years there have been many sea lions that have played Sparky.

=== African Hoof Stock ===
The African Hoof Stock exhibit was part of the 1970s zoo master plan and was finished in the mid-1980s. Animals in this exhibit include Grant's zebras, reticulated giraffes, Nyala, an African spurred tortoise, and a crowned crane.

=== Old Hoof Stock ===
The old hoof stock building is one of the oldest exhibits at the zoo and is home to plains bison and Arctic foxes.

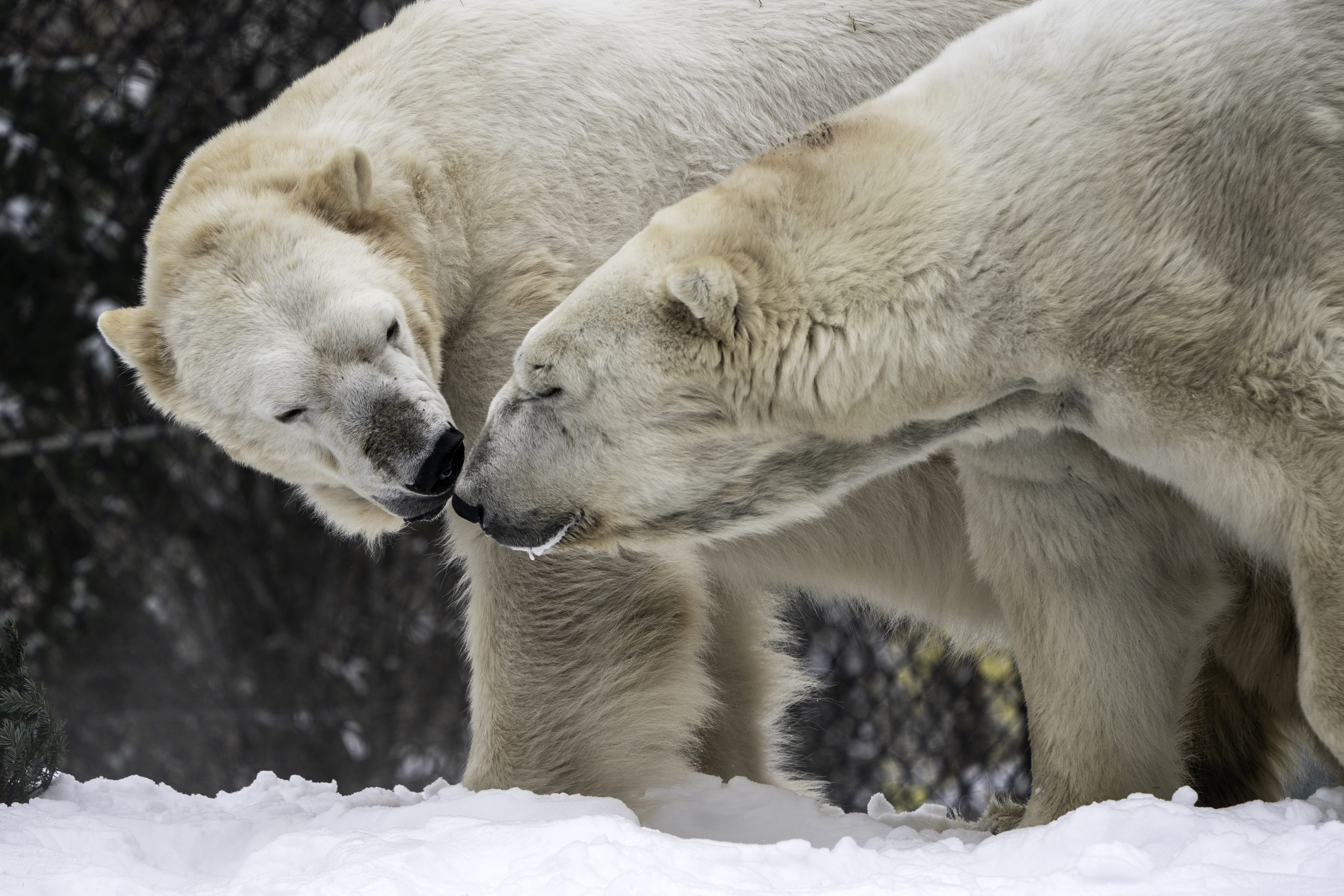
Polar bears, Buzz and Neil, part of the Polar Bear Odyssey exhibit

=== Tropical Encounters Exhibit ===
The Tropical Encounters Exhibit was created in 2005. Animals in this exhibit include Arrau turtles, bay-headed tanagers, black pacu, turquoise honeycreepers, Emerald tree boas, golden-headed manakins, mata matas, paradise tanagers, peacock bass, red-capped cardinals, redtail catfish, rufous-crowned tanagers, silver-beaked tanagers, freshwater stingrays, sunbitterns, swallow tanagers, turquoise tanagers, violaceous euphonia, yellow-rumped cacique, yellow-spotted river turtle, green anaconda, and saffron finches.

=== Wolf Woods ===
Wolf Woods is in the process of being removed and remodeled as of 2026

=== Polar Bear Odyssey ===
The Polar Bear Odyssey opened in 2010 and is home to the zoo's polar bears. It replaces the old bear grottoes, and is four times the size of the old polar bear exhibit. An inside viewing area lets visitors view the bears swimming and the bears' indoor facility. The viewing area includes interactive computers that show how the world is changing, including the glacier ice caps in the Arctic.

== Gallery ==
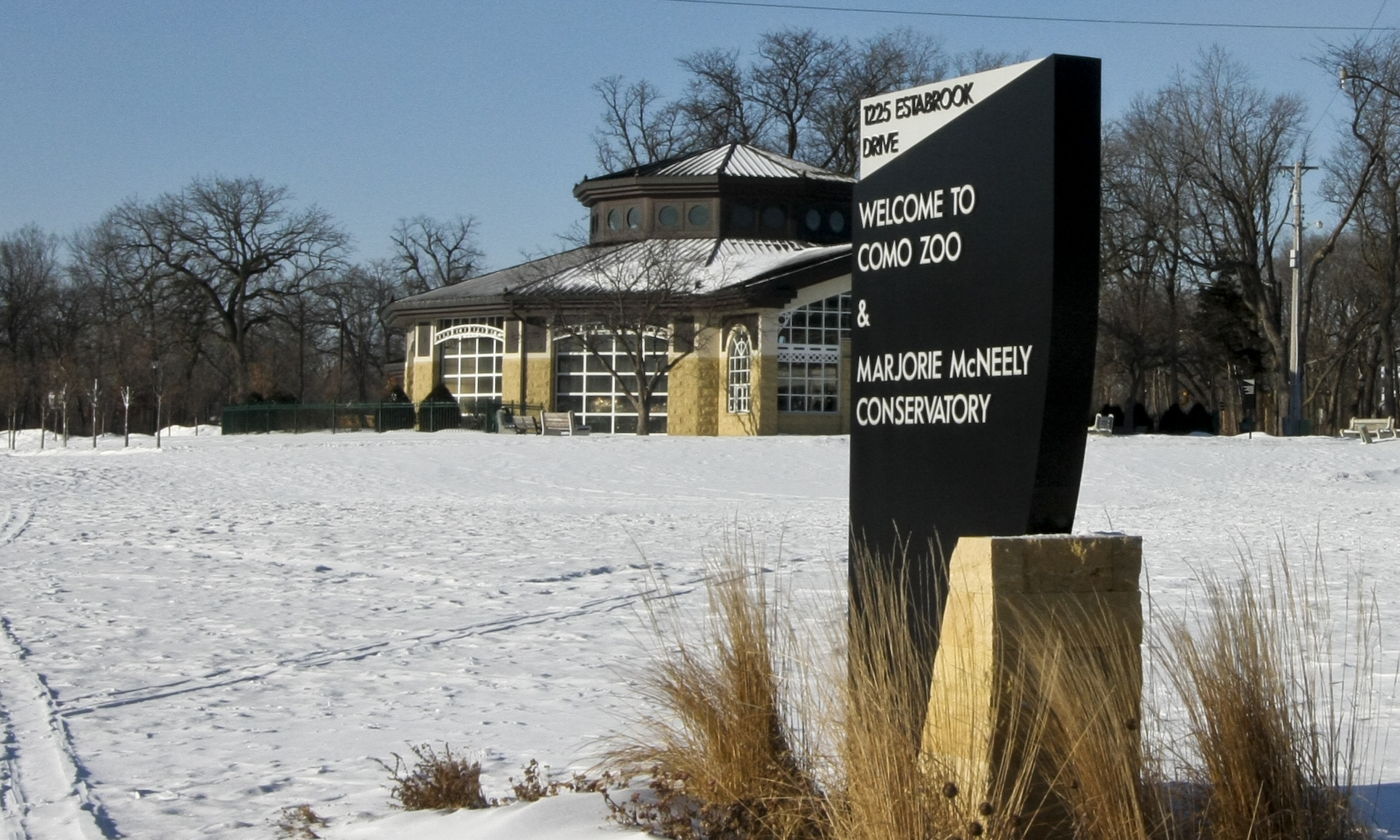
Entrance sign

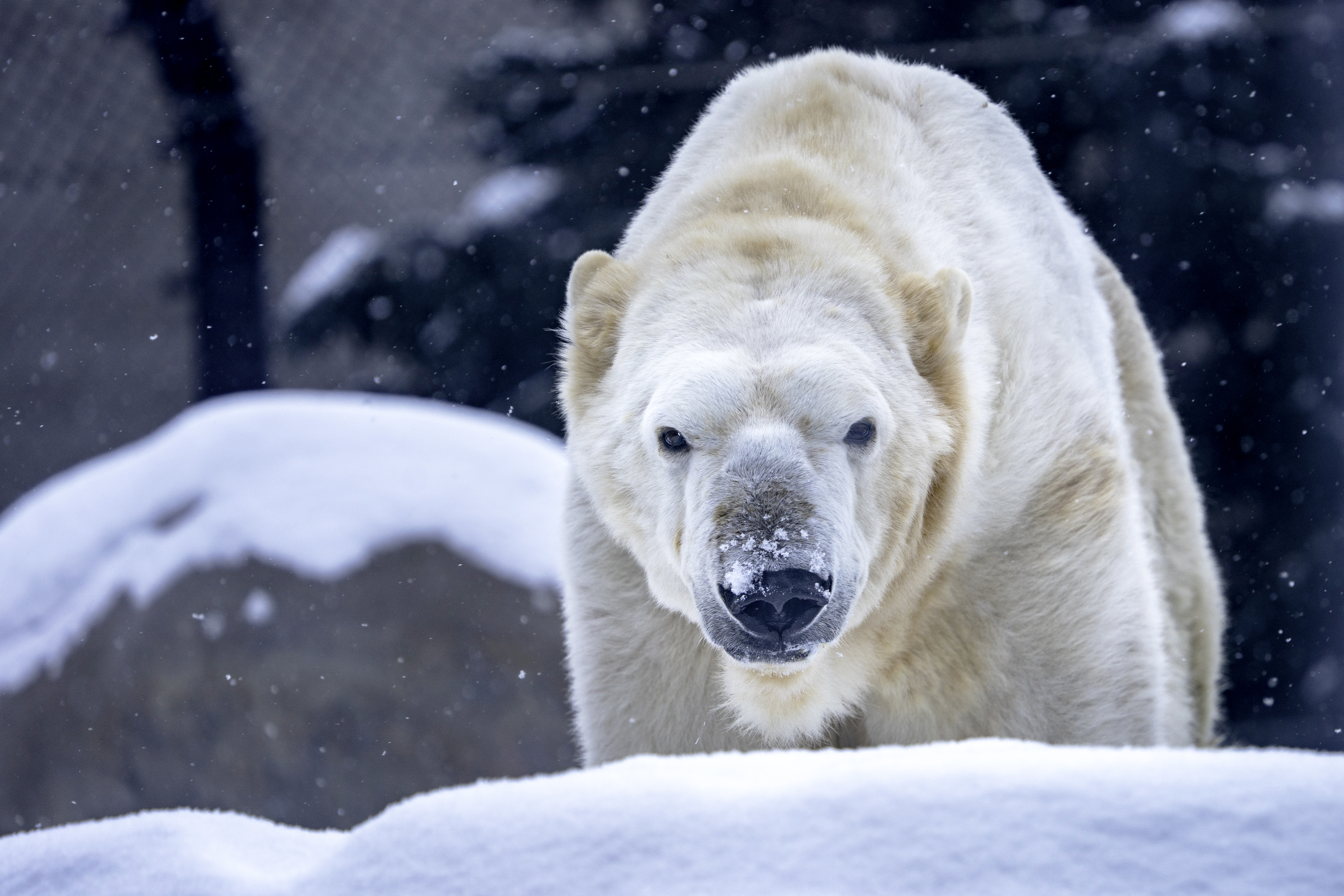
Neil, a 24-year-old polar bear

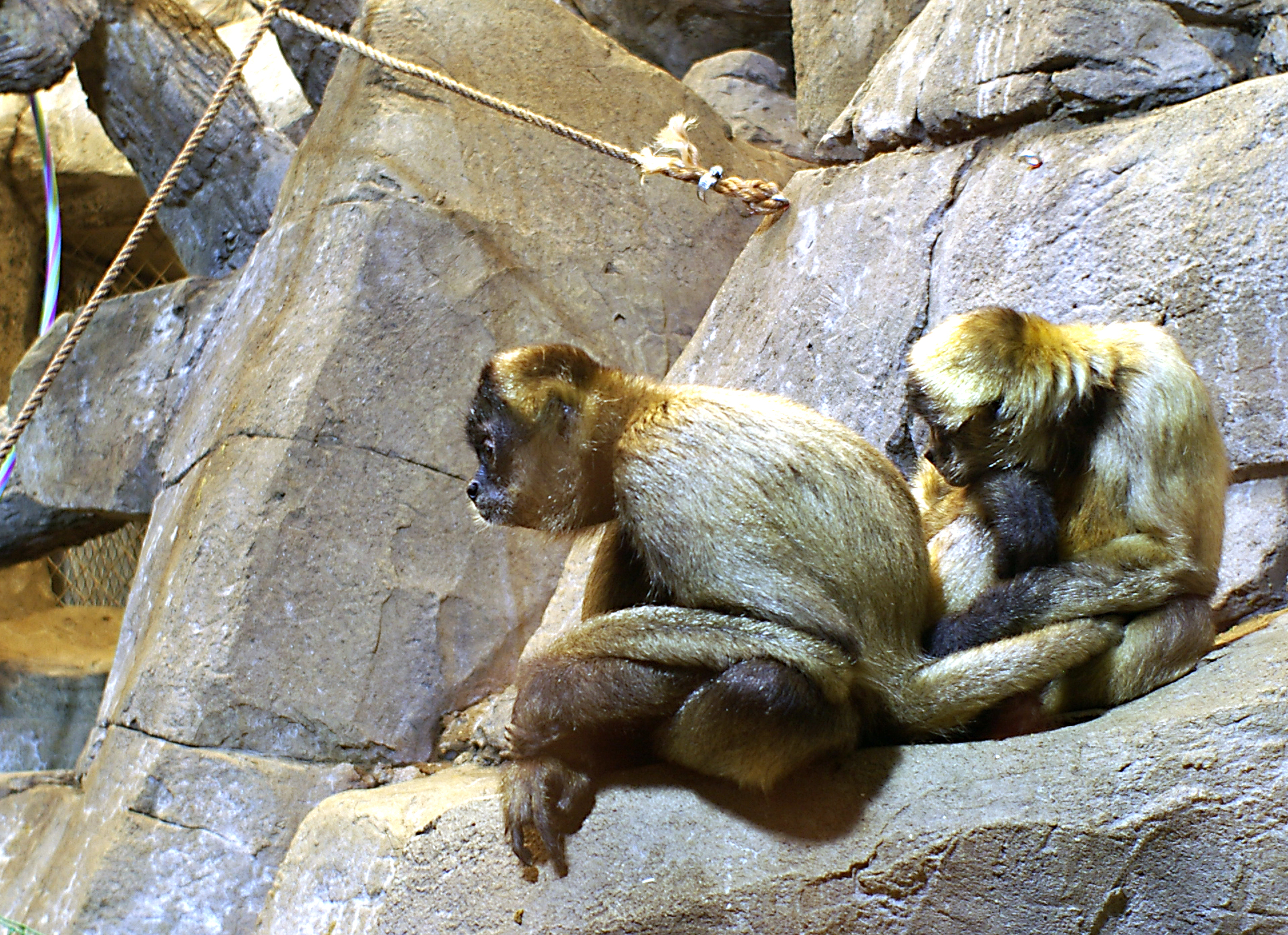
Geoffroy's spider monkey (Ateles geoffroyi) grooming

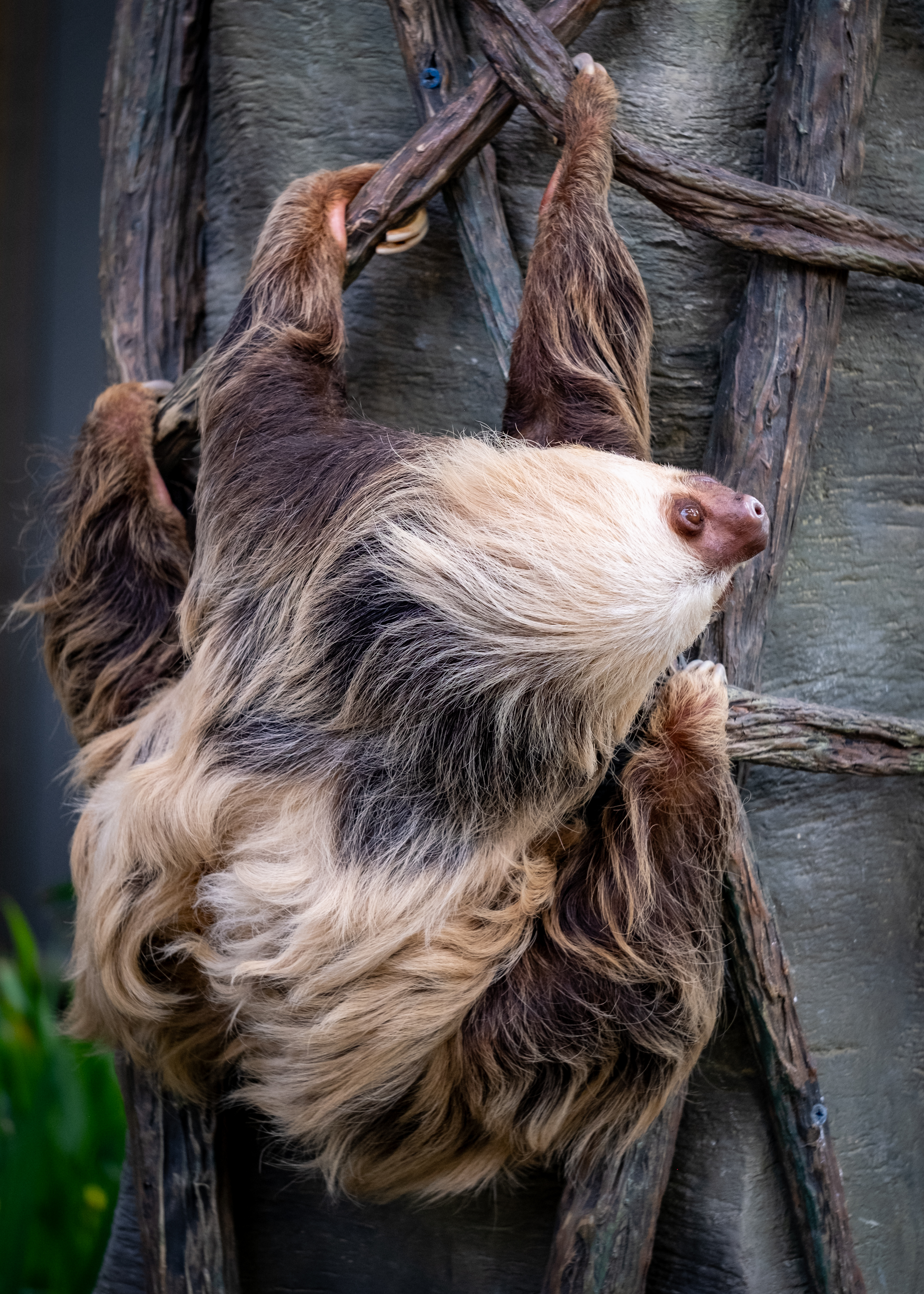
Chloe the Sloth at the zoo

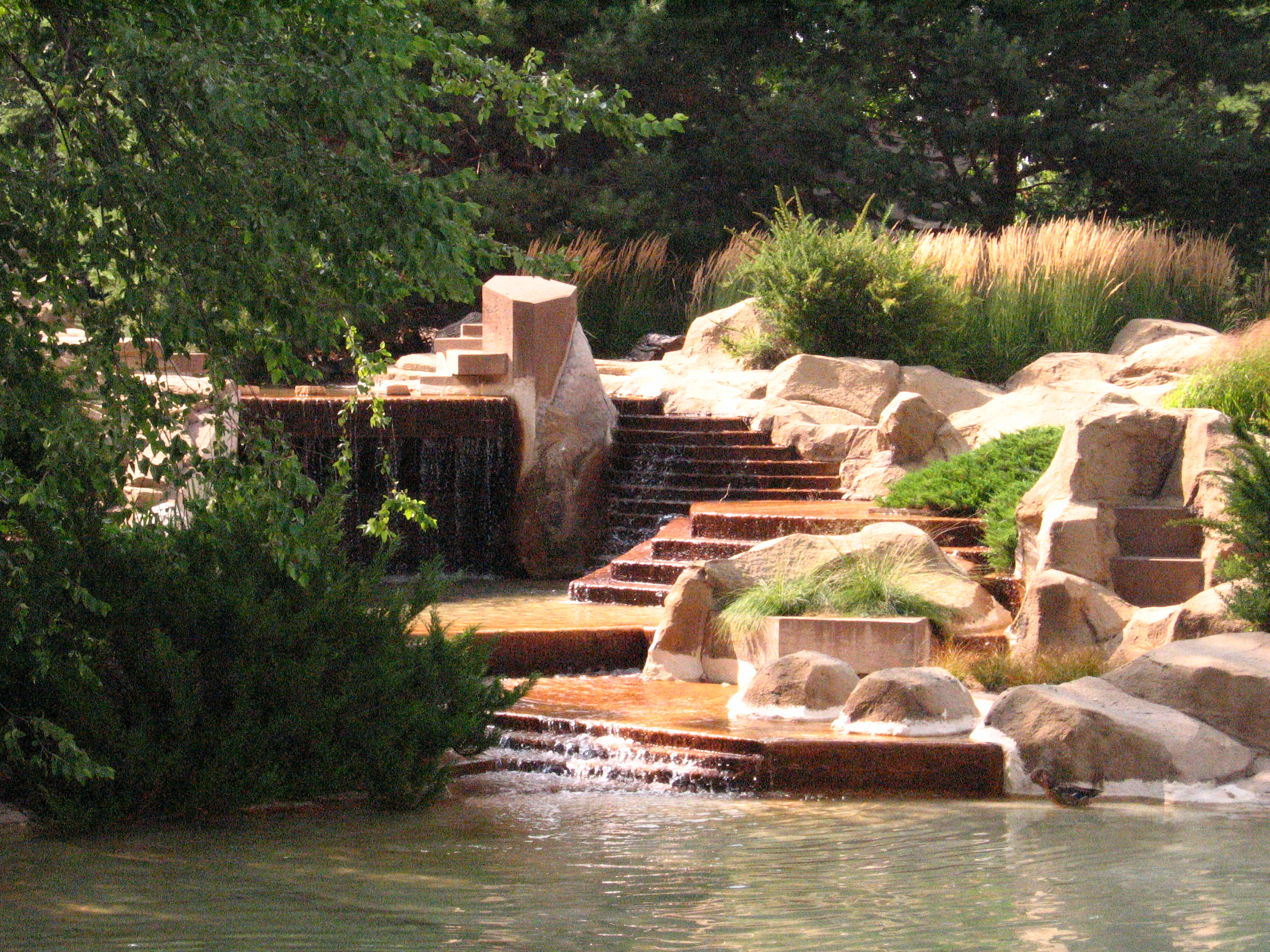
Bird habitat

Video of Blue-eyed black lemur (Eulemur flavifrons) eating

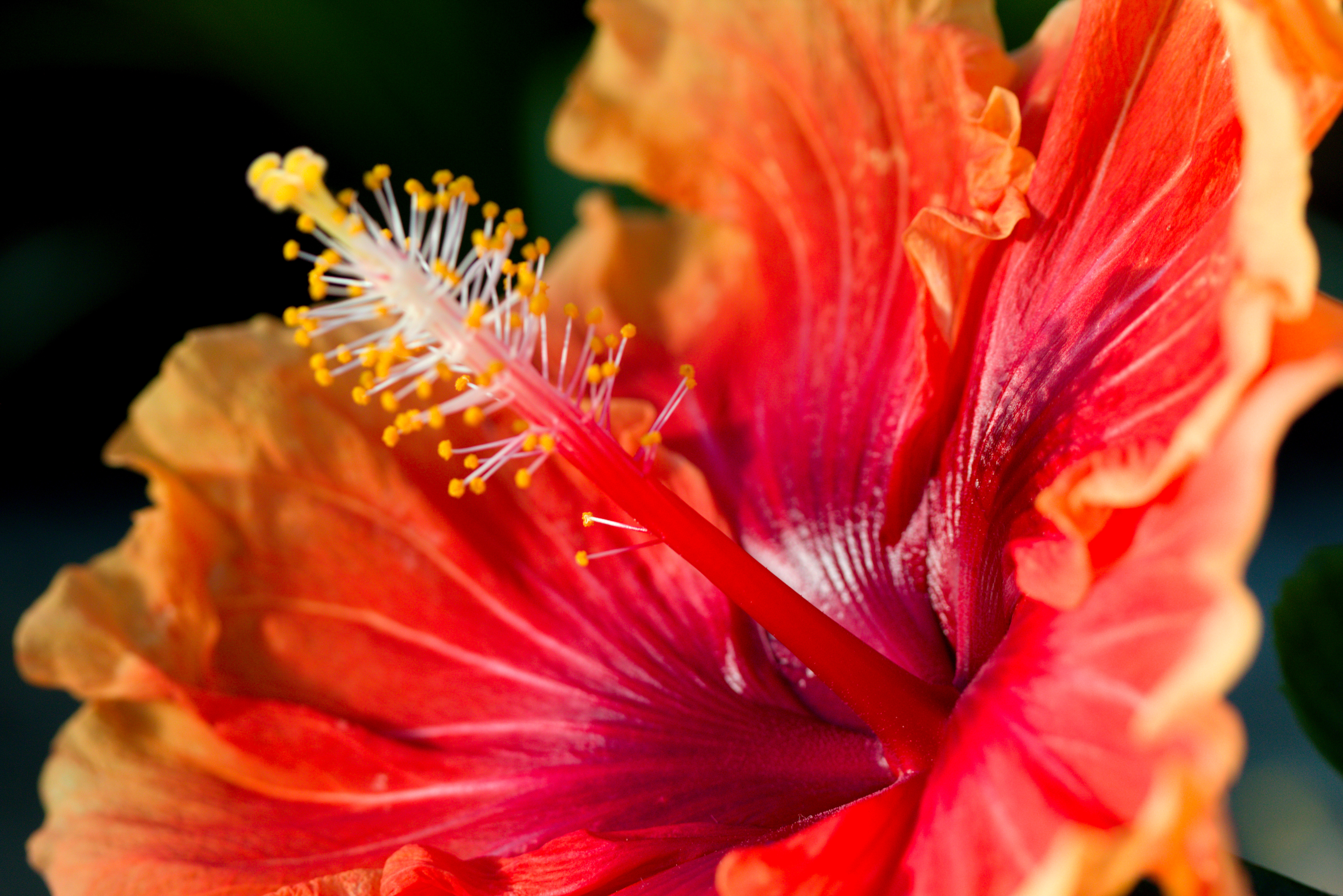
One of the many flowering plants

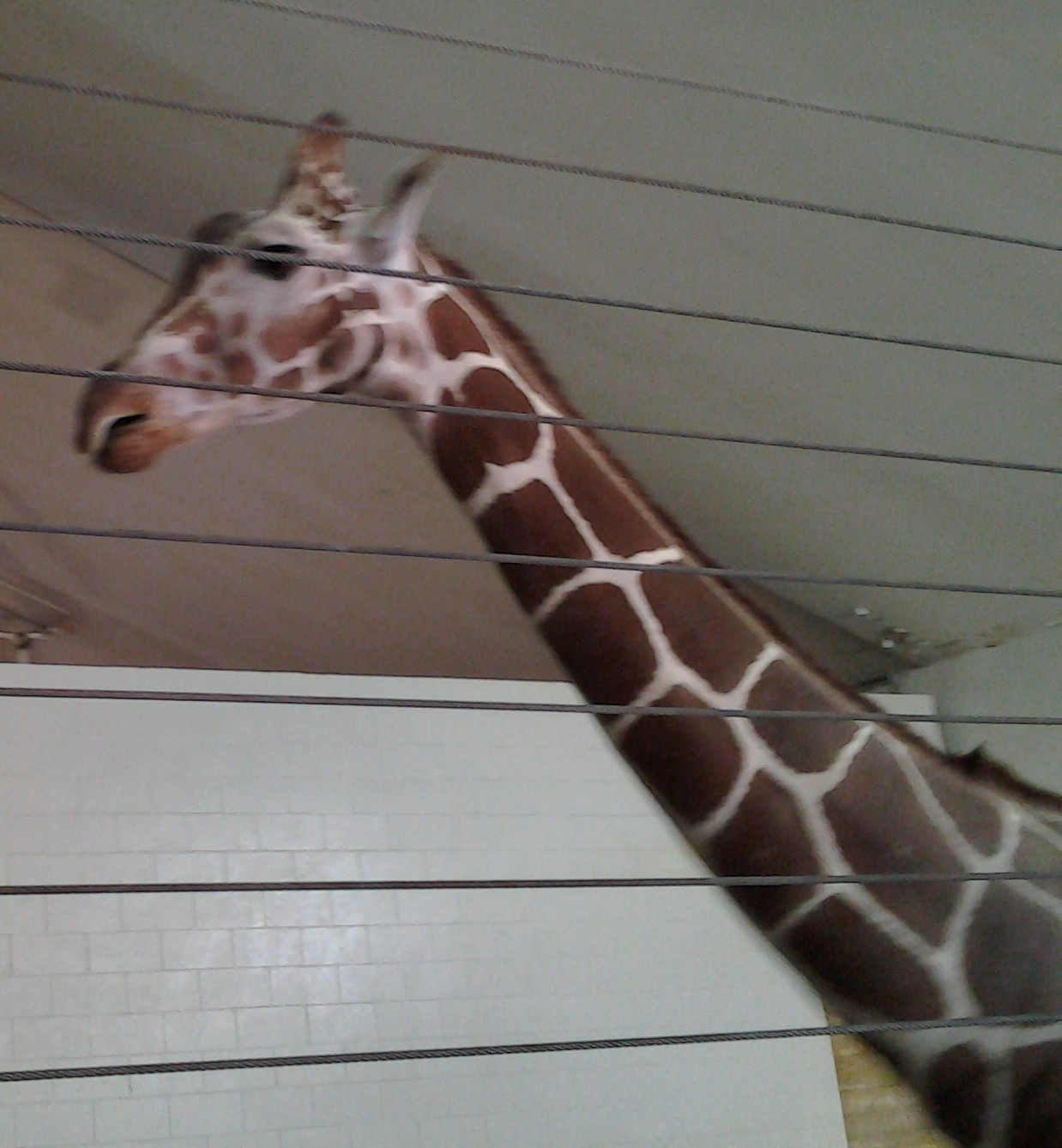
Giraffe

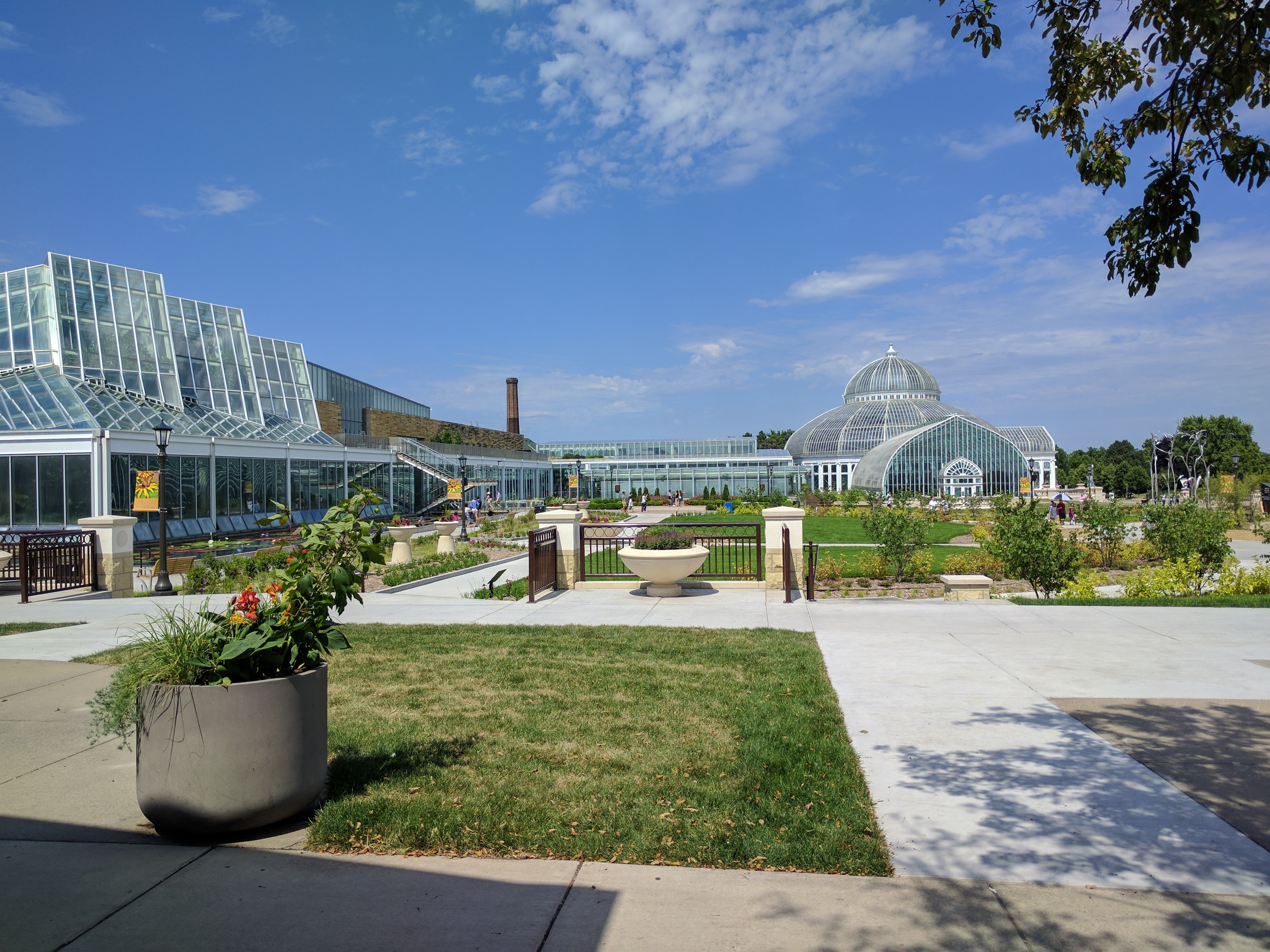
Como Zoo is connected to the Marjorie McNeely Conservatory

== See also ==
- Como Zoo and Conservatory
- Minnesota Zoo
- Zollman Zoo
