= List of Carnegie libraries in Minnesota =

The following list of Carnegie libraries in Minnesota provides detailed information on Carnegie libraries in Minnesota, United States, where 65 public libraries were built from 57 grants (totaling $969,375) awarded by the Carnegie Corporation of New York from 1901 to 1918. In addition, Hamline University in Saint Paul was awarded a $30,000 grant on March 12, 1906, to construct an academic library. In Minnesota grants were given between 1899 and 1918.

Of Minnesota's 66 original Carnegie libraries, 48 are still standing. 25 continue to house public libraries while others have been adapted into art centers or office space. Of the 18 lost libraries, one burned down and the rest were demolished, often because they were unworkably deficient in handicap accessibility. 38 of the surviving libraries are listed on the National Register of Historic Places (NRHP).

== Key ==
Building still operating as a library
Building standing, but now serving another purpose
Building no longer standing
Building listed on the National Register of Historic Places
Building contributes to a historic district on the National Register of Historic Places

== Public libraries ==
	Library	City or town	Image	Date granted	Grant amount	Location	Notes
1	Aitkin	Aitkin		Apr 23, 1908	$6,500	121 2nd St NW; 46°31′59.31″N 93°42′33.55″W	1911 library, now an art center.
2	Albert Lea	Albert Lea		Apr 11, 1902	$13,000	146 College St W 43°38′49.58″N 93°22′11.02″W	Built 1903, now offices.
3	Alexandria	Alexandria		Feb 2, 1903	$12,000	7th Ave W & Filmore St; 45°53′6.25″N 95°22′43.75″W	Built 1903, now offices.
4	Anoka	Anoka		Mar 27, 1903	$12,500	Demolished	Built 1904, razed 1965.
5	Austin	Austin		Oct 3, 1901	$15,000	Demolished	Built 1904, razed 1996.
6	Bemidji	Bemidji		Feb 10, 1908	$12,500	426 Bemidji Ave; 47°28′21.63″N 94°52′46.13″W	Built 1909, now an art gallery.
7	Benson	Benson		Apr 3, 1912	$7,500	Demolished	Built 1913, razed 1994.
8	Brainerd	Brainerd		Jan 6, 1903	$12,000	206 7th St N 46°21′30.16″N 94°11′55.91″W	Built 1904, now offices.
9	Browns Valley	Browns Valley		Jan 31, 1914	$5,500	Broadway Ave & 2nd St; 45°35′42.13″N 96°49′51.03″W	Built 1915.
10	Chatfield	Chatfield		Jul 9, 1913	$6,000	314 Main St S 43°50′40.86″N 92°11′14.44″W	Built 1915, still houses public library.
11	Coleraine	Coleraine		Dec 16, 1908	$15,000	203 Cole Ave; 47°17′14.03″N 93°25′27.45″W	Built 1910, still houses public library.
12	Crookston	Crookston		Nov 25, 1903	$17,500	110 N. Ash St. 47°46′25.43″N 96°36′17.52″W	Built 1907.
13	Dawson	Dawson		Mar 31, 1916	$9,000	677 Pine St; 44°55′43.35″N 96°3′20.42″W	Built 1918, now offices.
14	Detroit Lakes	Detroit Lakes		Dec 23, 1911	$10,000	1000 Washington Ave; 46°48′56.27″N 95°50′45.01″W	Built 1913, still houses public library.
15	Duluth (Main)	Duluth		Oct 7, 1899	$75,000	101 2nd St W 46°47′14.33″N 92°6′8.13″W	Built 1902, closed 1980.
16	Duluth Lincoln	Duluth		Oct 7, 1899	$30,000	2227 W 2nd St; 46°46′0.12″N 92°7′44.45″W	Built 1917, now an art institute.
17	Duluth West Duluth	Duluth		Oct 7, 1899	$20,000	Demolished	Built 1912, razed 1992.
18	Eveleth	Eveleth		Feb 20, 1911	$15,000	614 Pierce St; 47°27′44.69″N 92°32′8.4″W	Built 1914, still houses public library.
19	Fairmont	Fairmont		Feb 12, 1903	$10,000	Demolished	Built 1904, razed 1968.
20	Fergus Falls	Fergus Falls		Feb 20, 1904	$21,475	121 Union St N 46°17′3.52″N 96°4′41.29″W	Built 1905, now offices.
21	Glenwood	Glenwood		May 2, 1907	$10,000	108 1st Ave SE; 45°38′56.78″N 95°23′17.29″W	Built 1908, still houses public library.
22	Graceville	Graceville		May 21, 1913	$7,000	Demolished	Built 1915, razed 1999.
23	Grand Rapids	Grand Rapids		Jan 19, 1905	$10,000	21 5th St NE	Built 1905, now offices.
24	Hibbing	Hibbing		Apr 23, 1906	$25,000	Demolished	Built 1908, razed in the 1950s.
25	Hutchinson	Hutchinson		Apr 13, 1903	$12,500	50 Hassan St SE; 44°53′30.06″N 94°22′5.5″W	Built 1904, still houses public library.
26	Janesville	Janesville		May 2, 1911	$5,000	102 2nd St W 44°7′3″N 93°42′28.34″W	Built 1912, still houses public library.
27	Lake City	Lake City		Nov 7, 1917	$13,000	Demolished	Built 1917, razed 1967.
28	Litchfield	Litchfield		Feb 12, 1903	$10,000	201 Sibley Ave S 45°7′29.12″N 94°31′40.13″W	Built 1904, now commercial space.
29	Little Falls	Little Falls		Mar 14, 1902	$10,000	108 3rd St NE; 45°58′36.08″N 94°21′31.32″W	Built 1904, still houses public library.
30	Luverne	Luverne		Mar 27, 1903	$10,000	205 Freeman Ave N 43°39′19.86″N 96°12′35.69″W	Built 1904, now an art center.
31	Madison	Madison		Feb 1, 1905	$8,000	401 6th Ave; 45°0′44.9″N 96°11′36.58″W	Built 1905, still houses public library.
32	Mankato	Mankato		Feb 6, 1901	$40,000	120 Broad Rd S 44°9′56.86″N 94°0′3.56″W	Built 1902, now an art center.
33	Mapleton	Mapleton		Mar 25, 1905	$5,000	104 1st Ave NE; 43°55′42.78″N 93°57′28.03″W	Built 1910, still houses public library.
34	Marshall	Marshall		Feb 12, 1903	$10,000	Demolished	Built 1904, razed 1966.
35	Minneapolis Central Avenue	Minneapolis		Apr 3, 1912	$125,000	Demolished	Built 1915, razed 1972 and replaced with the Northeast Library.
36	Minneapolis Franklin	Minneapolis		Apr 3, 1912	—	1314 Franklin Ave E 44°57′46.74″N 93°15′21.06″W	Built 1914, still houses public library.
37	Minneapolis Hosmer	Minneapolis		Apr 3, 1912	—	347 36th St E 44°56′15.05″N 93°16′13.97″W	Built 1916, still houses public library.
38	Minneapolis Sumner	Minneapolis		Apr 3, 1912	—	611 VanWhite Memorial Blvd; 44°59′5.18″N 93°17′40.43″W	Built 1915, still houses public library.
39	Montevideo	Montevideo		Dec 16, 1905	$10,000	125 3rd St N 44°56′47.3″N 95°43′24.44″W	Built 1906, now community space.
40	Moorhead	Moorhead		Feb 29, 1904	$12,000	Demolished	Built 1906, razed 1963.
41	Morris	Morris		Dec 4, 1903	$10,000	Nevada Ave & 6th St; 45°35′8.66″N 95°55′4.11″W	Built 1905, now the Stevens County Historical Society.
42	Mountain Iron	Mountain Iron		Jan 14, 1914	$8,000	5742 Mountain Ave; 47°31′58.21″N 92°37′18.67″W	Built 1915, still houses public library.
43	Northfield	Northfield		Jan 8, 1908	$10,000	210 Washington St; 44°27′27.57″N 93°9′32.48″W	Built 1910, still houses public library.
44	Ortonville	Ortonville		Aug 11, 1913	$10,000	412 2nd St NW; 45°18′30.5″N 96°26′53.62″W	Built 1915, still houses public library.
45	Park Rapids	Park Rapids		May 8, 1908	$5,000	101 2nd St W 46°55′16.9″N 95°3′32.01″W	Open 1910–1994, now houses a museum.
46	Pipestone	Pipestone		Mar 22, 1903	$10,000	217 Hiawatha Ave S 43°59′54.81″N 96°19′2.47″W	Built 1904. Closed as unsafe. Needs $450K to $500K of repairs.
47	Preston	Preston		Dec 2, 1909	$8,000	101 Saint Paul St NW; 43°40′12.4″N 92°5′1.17″W	Built 1909, still houses public library.
48	Red Wing	Red Wing		Dec 14, 1901	$17,000	Demolished	Built 1903, razed 1968.
49	Redwood Falls	Redwood Falls		Nov 25, 1903	$10,000	334 Jefferson St S 44°32′20.24″N 95°6′59.78″W	Housed library 1904–1995, now private business offices.
50	St. Cloud	St. Cloud		Feb 16, 1901	$25,000	Demolished	Built 1902, razed 1981.
51	St. Paul Arlington Hills	St. Paul		May 8, 1914	$75,000	1105 Greenbrier St; 44°58′28.23″N 93°4′16.89″W	Public library 1917–2014, now houses the non-profit East Side Freedom Library.
52	St. Paul Riverview	St. Paul		May 8, 1914	—	1 E George St; 44°55′47.69″N 93°5′5.01″W	Built 1917, still houses public library.
53	St. Paul St. Anthony Park	St. Paul		May 8, 1914	—	2245 Como Ave W 44°58′51.56″N 93°11′36.88″W	Built 1917, still houses public library.
54	St. Peter	St. Peter		Jan 6, 1903	$10,000	429 Minnesota Ave S 44°19′20.94″N 93°57′29.35″W	Built 1904, now offices and retail, including a halal market.
55	Sauk Centre	Sauk Centre		Feb 12, 1903	$11,000	430 Main St S 45°44′5.72″N 94°57′8.31″W	Built 1904, now a public library and art center.
56	Spring Valley	Spring Valley		Mar 27, 1903	$8,000	201 Broadway Ave S 43°41′12.19″N 92°23′26.5″W	Built 1904, now city offices.
57	Stillwater	Stillwater		Jul 3, 1901	$27,500	224 3rd St N 45°3′27.12″N 92°48′37.12″W	Built 1902, still houses public library.
58	Thief River Falls	Thief River Falls		Jan 31, 1914	$12,500	102 Main Ave S 48°7′2.18″N 96°10′52.08″W	Built 1914, now county offices.
59	Two Harbors	Two Harbors		Feb 10, 1908	$15,000	320 Waterfront Dr; 47°1′21.19″N 91°40′14.32″W	Built 1909, still houses public library.
60	Virginia	Virginia		Dec 20, 1904	$10,000	Demolished	Built 1907, razed 1953.
61	Walker	Walker		Apr 8, 1910	$6,500	Demolished	Built 1910, burned down 1976.
62	White Bear	White Bear		Jul 13, 1912	$5,000	Demolished	Built 1914, razed 1973.
63	Willmar	Willmar		Jan 13, 1903	$11,000	Demolished	Built 1904, razed 1967.
64	Worthington	Worthington		Jun 1, 1903	$10,000	Demolished	Built 1905, razed 1966.
65	Zumbrota	Zumbrota		Nov 27, 1906	$6,500	320 East Avenue; 44°17′38.19″N 92°40′5.49″W	Built 1908, now an art center.

== Academic libraries ==
	Library	City or town	Image	Date granted	Grant amount	Location	Notes
1	Hamline University	Saint Paul		Mar 12, 1906	$30,000	1536 Hewitt Ave; 44°57′56.73″N 93°9′58.41″W	Built in 1907, now incorporated into the Giddens/Alumni Learning Center.

== See also ==
- List of libraries in the United States
