= Lincoln Branch Library =

- U.S. National Register of Historic Places
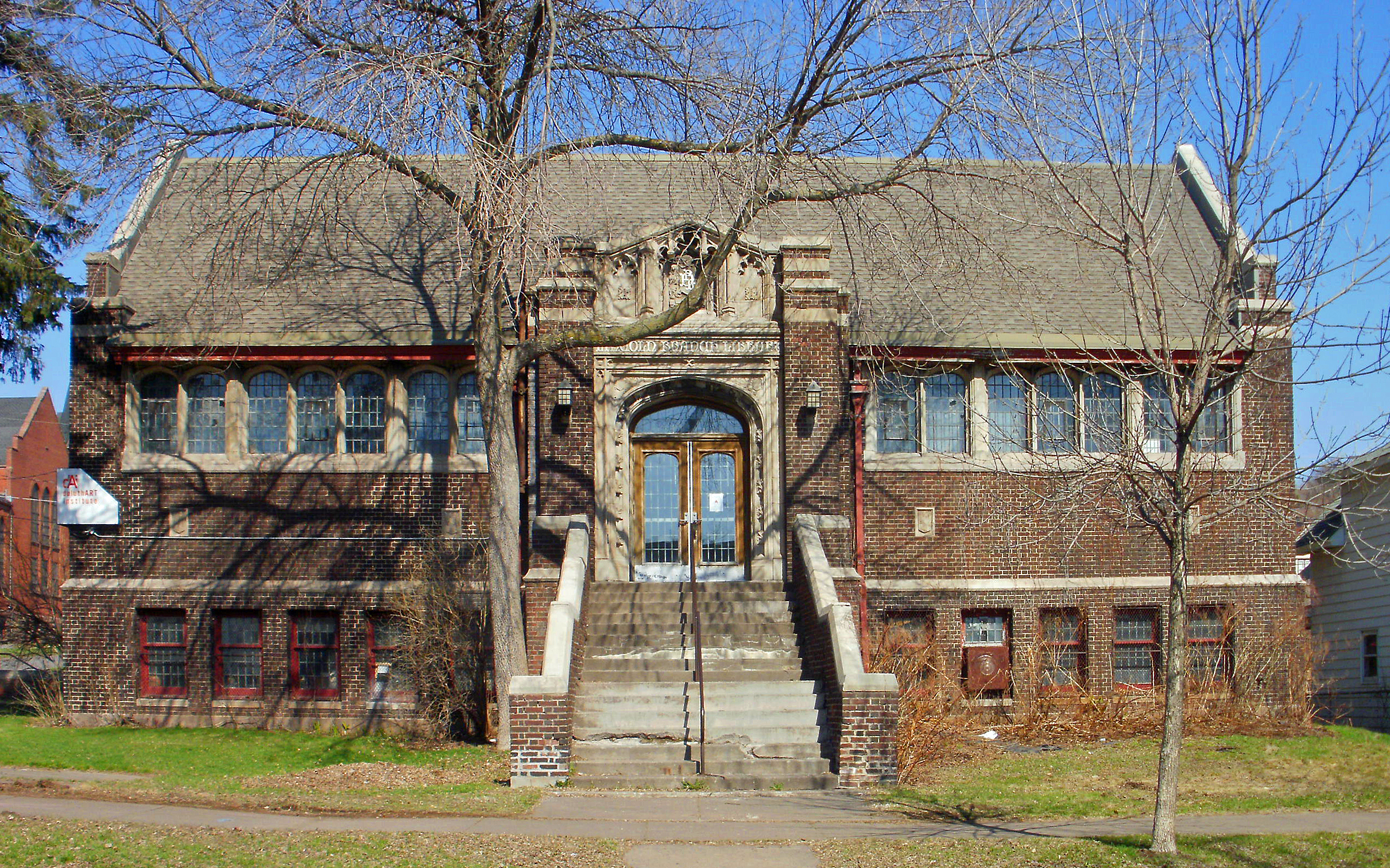
- Lincoln Branch Library viewed from the southeast

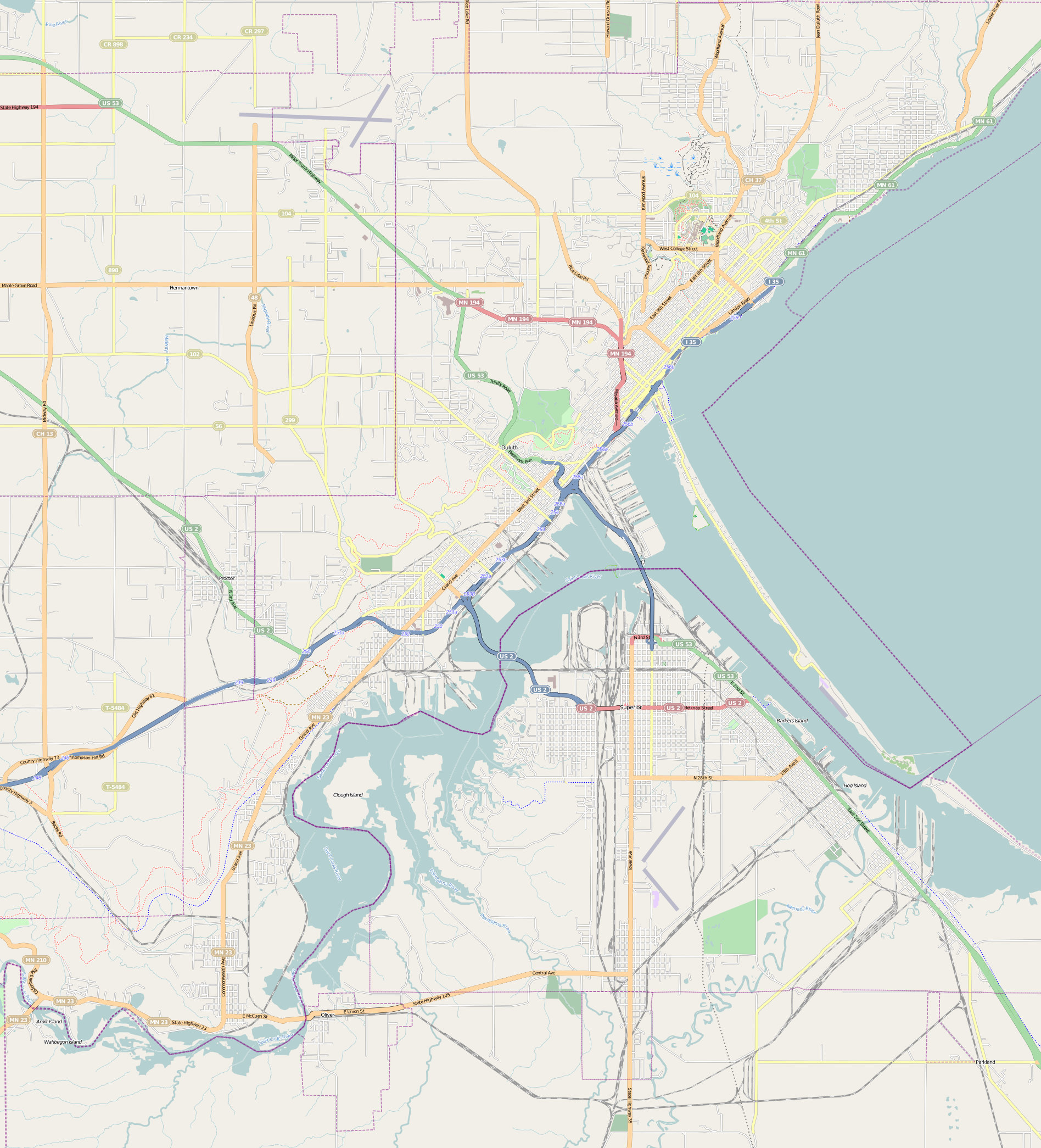
- Location within Duluth Location within Minnesota Location within the United States
- Location: 2229 W. 2nd Street, Duluth, Minnesota
- Coordinates: 46°46′0.3″N 92°7′44.5″W
- Area: Less than one acre
- Built: 1915–17
- Built by: Joseph Hanson
- Architect: Abraham Holstead & William J. Sullivan
- Architectural style: Late Gothic Revival
- NRHP reference No.: 12001175
- Added to NRHP: January 14, 2013

The Lincoln Branch Library is a former Carnegie library building in the Lincoln Park neighborhood of Duluth, Minnesota, United States. It was constructed from 1915 to 1917 as the first permanent home of a Duluth Public Library branch first established in 1892. The Lincoln Branch Library was built of brick and limestone in the Late Gothic Revival style. It was the last of the three Carnegie libraries built in Duluth.

Library services moved to a new facility in 1990. Two years later the Duluth Art Institute (DAI) purchased the vacated library building. The DAI uses the venue to host studio space, classes, and events.

In 2013 the Lincoln Branch Library building was listed on the National Register of Historic Places for its local significance in the theme of social history. It was nominated for reflecting the evolving emphasis of the Carnegie Foundation and Duluth Public Library on branch libraries and on providing services in working-class neighborhoods.

== Description ==
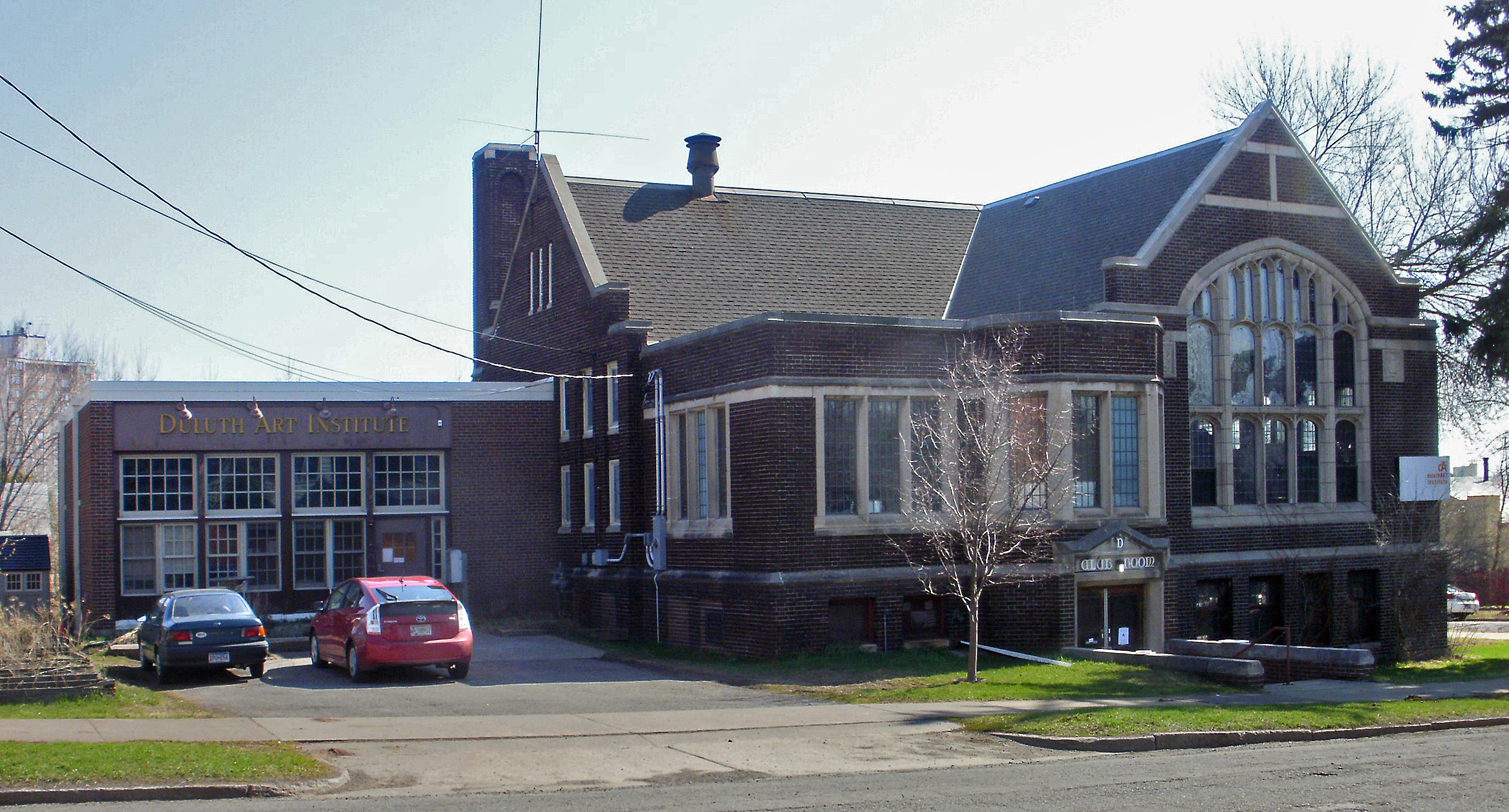
View from the west with garage addition on left

The Lincoln Branch Library is a rectangular building in Late Gothic Revival style. The original structure measures 69 by 51 feet (21 by 16 m), with a 32-by-36-foot (9.8 by 11.0 m) addition. The exterior facade is brown and dark red brickwork, arranged in Flemish bond, contrasted with limestone trim.

The southeast face of the building is symmetrical and features the library's main entrance. It was normal for Carnegie libraries to have steps to the entrance which symbolise spiritual elevation. A stairway with brick and limestone walling on each side leads to the entrance on the first floor. The entrance consists of a pair of wooden, glass-paned doors framed by limestone. The line of the eaves is interrupted by a pediment carved with an acanthus leaf design. In the middle of the pediment a shield motif bears the initials "DPL", standing for Duluth Public Library. Immediately above the doorway is carved "Lincoln Branch Library". The entrance is flanked by original, square lanterns. The ground level features two series of five 10/15 double-hung windows. The first level has two bands of seven windows flanking the entrance just below the eave. The ground and first floor are separated by a beveled limestone belt course, above which are symmetrically arranged carved stone shields. The stairway was rebuilt in 1996 using the original limestone.

The southwest façade features a large gable end with a three-tiered Gothic window framed in limestone. The window is flanked by two stone shields, and above it is a limestone band near the gable's peak in the shape of an "ɪ". The ground level 10/15 windows continue, along with the belt course separating the first and ground levels. There is a ground-level entrance to the west under a flat roof portion, consisting of a pair of wooden doors with arched glass panels. The entrance is topped by a pediment inscribed with "Club Room". A set of steps leads to the entrance, flanked by brick and limestone railings. The entrance sits on a two-story, pentagonal bay with windows wrapping around it on the first level. At the window head is another limestone course which wraps around the building's west side.

Along the northwest face is where the garage addition was built, obstructing the original façade. According to original blueprints, the addition forced the removal of windows and possibly an entrance. At ground level, four window openings appear to have been bricked over. There are two rows of three windows on the first level on the exposed area of the northwest gable end. Near the peak of the gable are three narrow, vertical windows.

The northeast face is similar to the southwest; the gable has the same window, stone shields, and I-shaped band. The belt course continues around the facade, and six 10/15 windows are arrayed at ground level. At the building's north corner is a rectangular brick chimney, capped by stone with a quoin at each corner. The corner also features five windows with a limestone course at the window head.

The building has undergone a number of renovations over its life, but most were performed to comply with building codes and did not significantly impact the library's historic integrity.

The property is minimally landscaped. A large conifer stands at the southern corner of the building, and there is a deciduous tree east of the main entrance. There is garden space next to the building along the southeast and southwest facades. The building is surrounded by a cultivated lawn.

== History ==
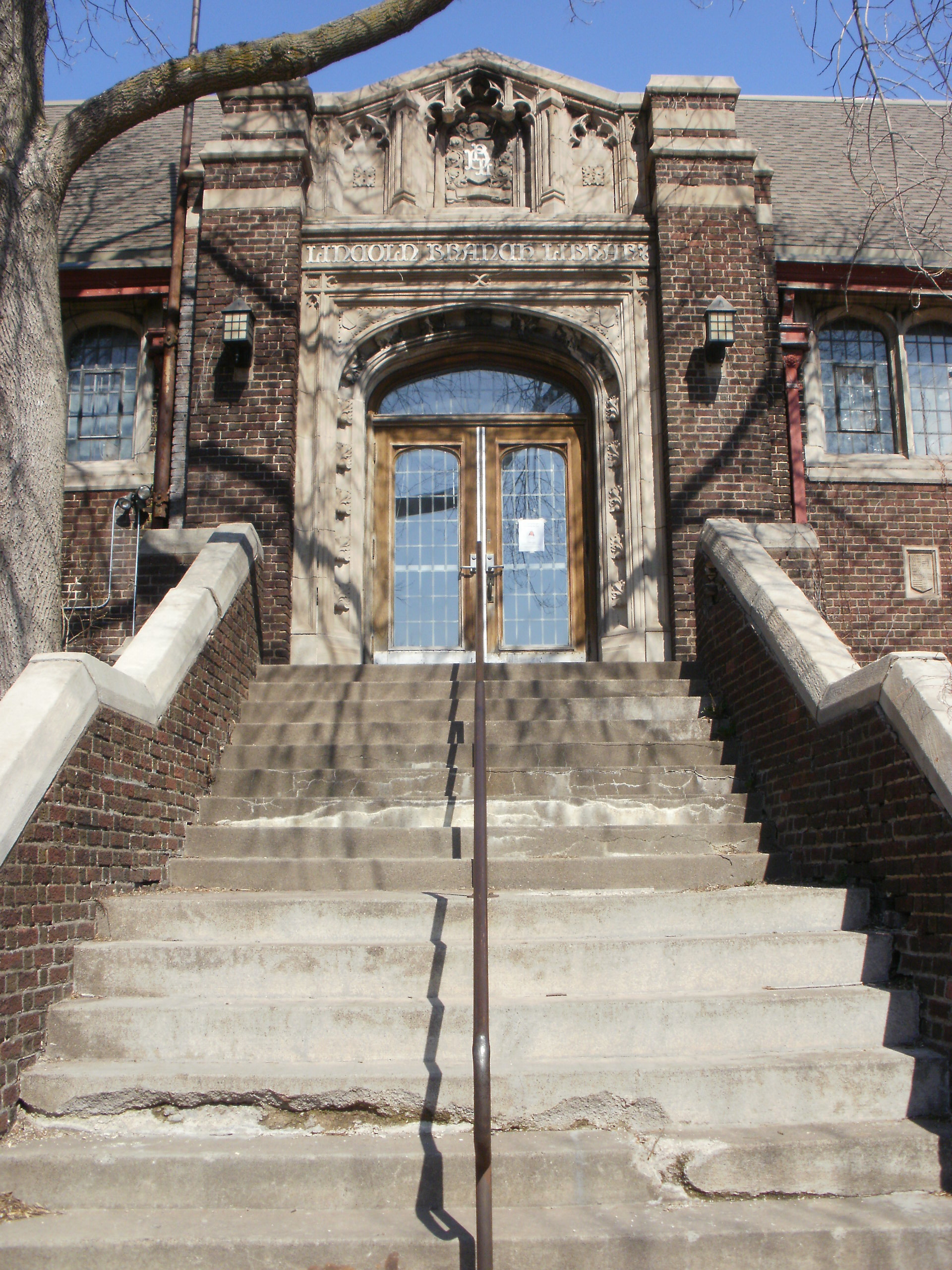
Detail of main entrance on the southeast face

In 1891, a committee of neighborhood citizens met with the Duluth Library Board to establish a library in Duluth's West End (known as Lincoln Park since 1996). The West End Branch Library, as it was initially called, opened in 1892 in a room of the Irwin–Sloan Block. It operated until the Panic of 1893 and funding cuts forced its closure. It reopened in 1895, but again faced closure in 1896. A Duluth resident made a gift to the library which helped for a time, but the library again closed around the end of 1900. The library opened again in January 1908 and, over the next several years, shifted among a number of locations but remained in operation.

An appropriation of $4,300 (equivalent to $136,850 in 2025) was made in April 1915 to purchase two lots in the West End, which were acquired in May. A request for $30,000 (equivalent to $954,770 in 2025) for a permanent library was made of and subsequently granted by Andrew Carnegie. Abraham Holstead and William J. Sullivan were chosen as the architects and Joseph Hanson served as contractor. Designs and blueprints for the library were completed by April 1916. The library was named for its proximity to Lincoln Park, located in the West End. Construction lasted through 1917. The library held its grand opening on August 30, 1917, with 500 people in attendance for a gala ceremony. The library publicly opened on September 1. The Lincoln Branch Library was the third and last Carnegie library built in Duluth, following the 1902 Duluth Public Library and the West Duluth Branch Library.

In 1966, a garage was built on the library's northeast face to house two bookmobiles. The building operated as a library until October 1990, when a new library assumed service for western Duluth. The building was bought by the Duluth Art Institute in November 1992. According to the institute, it was purchased to acquire more space and to "reach under-served communities." In 1997, the garage addition was renovated, including the replacement of the garage doors with windows.

== See also ==
- List of Carnegie libraries in Minnesota
- National Register of Historic Places listings in St. Louis County, Minnesota
