= Duluth Public Library (historic) =

- U.S. National Register of Historic Places
- The former Duluth Public Library viewed from the southeast

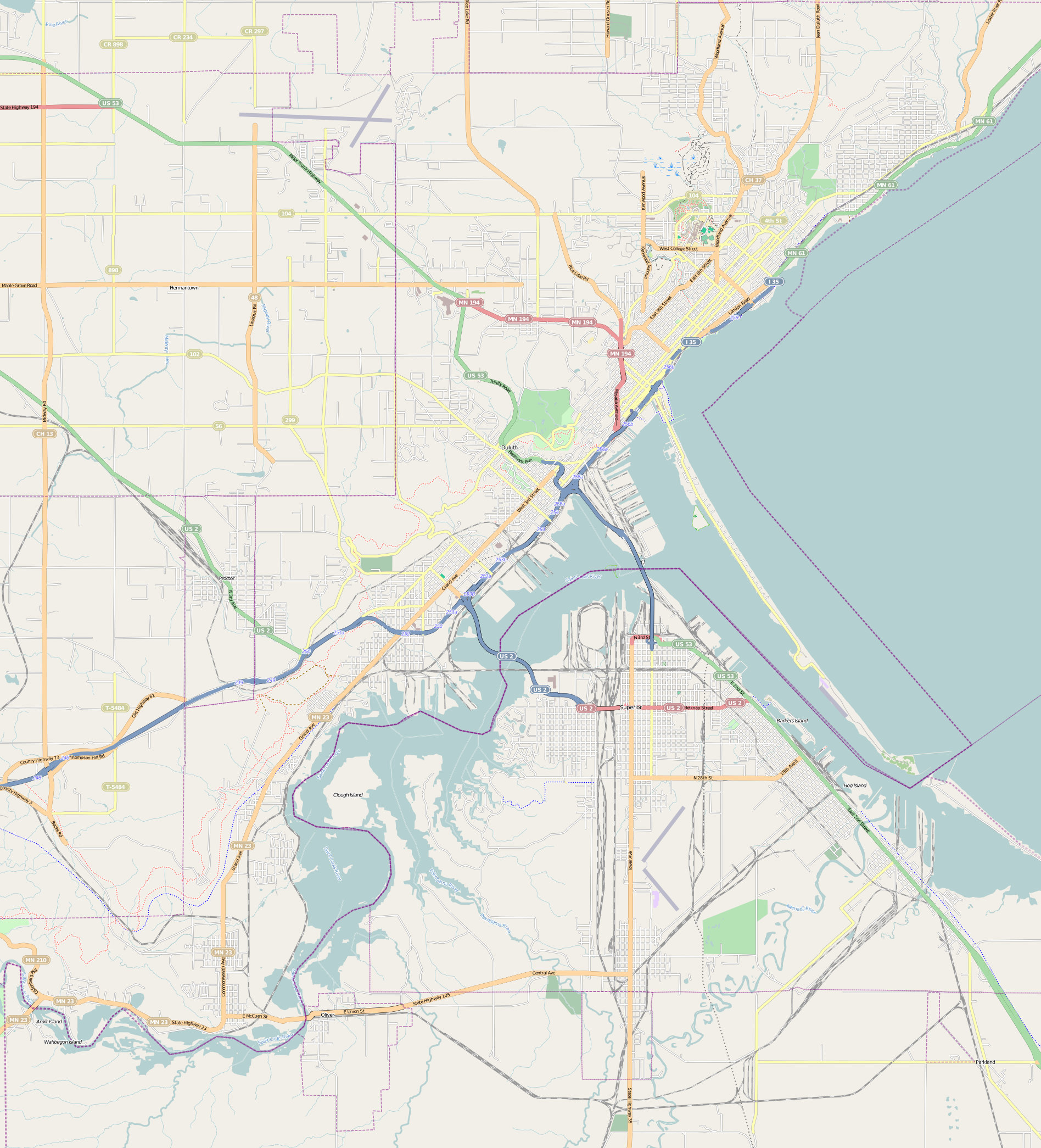
- Location within Duluth Location within Minnesota Location within the United States
- Location: 101 W. 2nd Street, Duluth, Minnesota
- Coordinates: 46°47′14″N 92°6′8″W
- Area: Less than one acre
- Built: 1902
- Architect: Adolph F. Rudolph
- Architectural style: Neoclassical
- NRHP reference No.: 78003125
- Added to NRHP: May 5, 1978

The historic Duluth Public Library is a former Carnegie library building at 101 West Second Street in Duluth, Minnesota, United States. It was constructed in 1902 as the first purpose-built facility of the Duluth Public Library. It was listed on the National Register of Historic Places in 1978 for its local significance in the themes of architecture and education. It was nominated for its Neoclassical architecture and association with early community education efforts.

Library services relocated to a new downtown facility in 1980, after which the historic library was renovated and converted into an office building.

== History ==
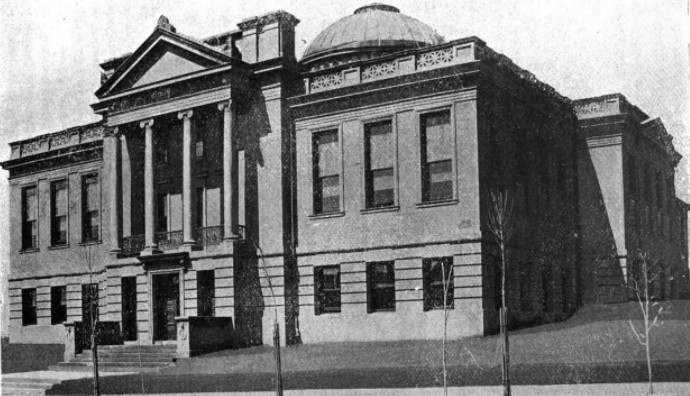
The library in 1902

In 1899, through the efforts of the Duluth Evening Herald, Andrew Carnegie gifted $50,000 for the construction of a library in Duluth. Later that year, the city purchased three lots for $16,000 on which to build the library. By 1900, the city had selected a design by architects Radcliffe & Willoughby, but later decided to go with a design by Adolph F. Rudolph instead. The designs would cost at least $50,000, so in mid-1900 the city requested and received an additional $25,000 from Carnegie for a total of $75,000.

Construction began in 1901, with the cost estimated at $68,900. The cornerstone was laid on July 4, 1901, as part of the Independence Day celebrations. By the end of construction the library cost slightly more than the $75,000 donated by Carnegie. Expenses for the property and furniture were covered separately by the city. The library opened on April 19, 1902.

The Duluth Public Library was the first of three Carnegie libraries to open in Duluth, followed by the West Duluth Branch Library in 1912 and the Lincoln Branch Library in 1917. In 1927, an addition was built at the rear of this library to house additional book stacks and other facilities.

The Carnegie library served as Duluth's main library until 1980, (Note: Various sources list different closing years for the library, including the late 1970s, 1980, and 1981.) when it moved to its new location at 520 West Superior Street. After the library ceased operations, it was renovated and became an office building.

== Architecture ==
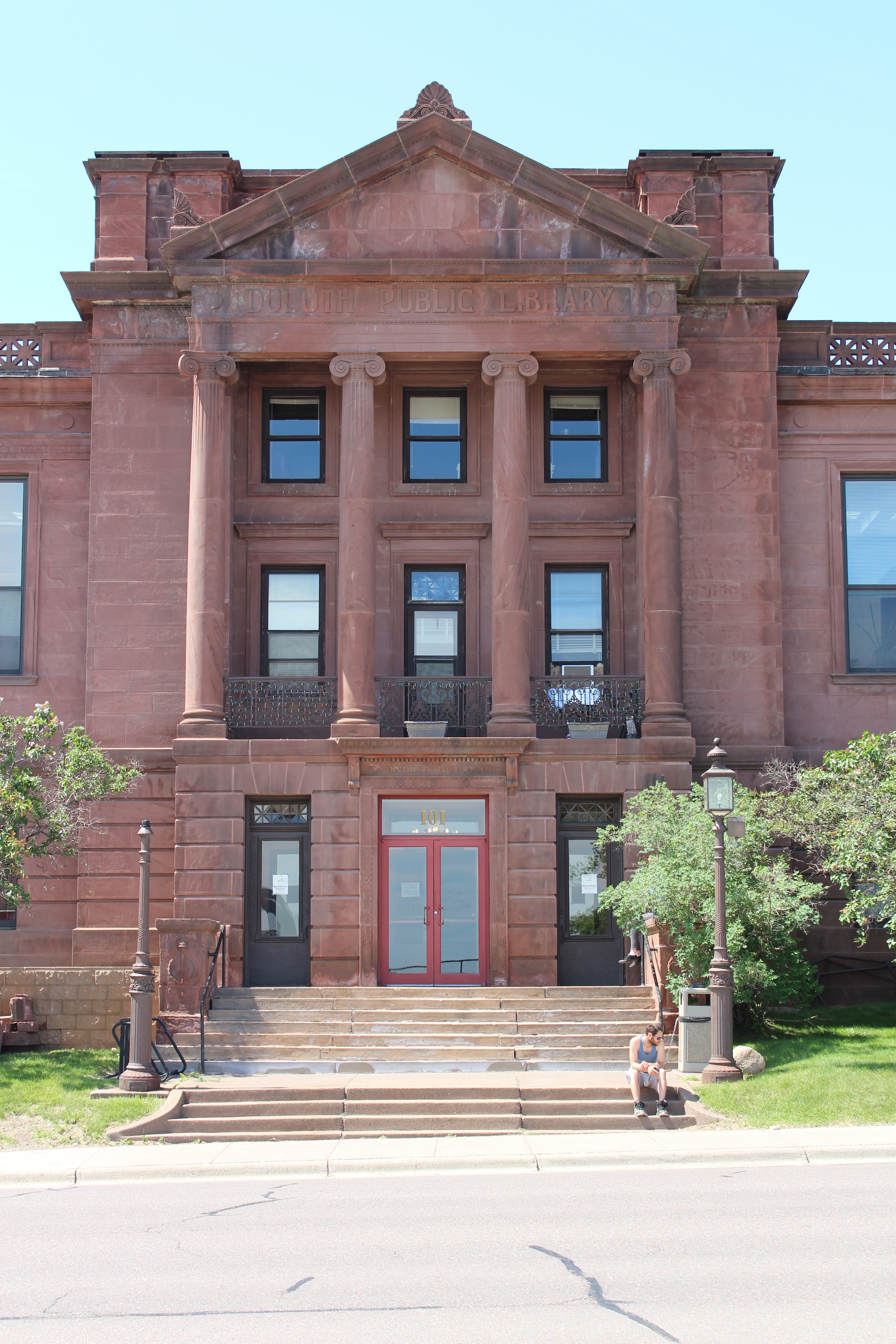
Detail of the entrance

The library is a two-story neoclassical building made of brick and Port Wing brown sandstone. The front of the building features a portico with four Ionic columns topped by a pediment decorated with the letters "DULUTH PUBLIC LIBRARY". The roof features a low circular dome near the center of the building.

As of 1977, the main entrance to the library was at the basement level; this floor housed stacks and rooms for workshops and book mending. A stairway led to the first floor which housed children's books and periodicals. A white marble staircase led to the second floor which housed the circulation desk, more stacks, and the reading and reference rooms. The reading and reference rooms were symmetric to either side of the staircase along the main facade, each featuring a stained glass window.

The stained glass windows were both designed by Anne Weston and manufactured by Louis C. Tiffany Studios. The first window, commissioned in 1893, depicts Minnehaha, a character in Henry Wadsworth Longfellow's epic poem The Song of Hiawatha, standing in front of Minnehaha Falls. It was displayed in the Minnesota Building at the 1893 World's Columbian Exposition, and then gifted to the Duluth Public Library, which was based out of the Masonic Temple at the time. The window moved to the Carnegie library after being donated to the library following a dispute with the Masonic Temple. The second window was commissioned in 1904 and depicts Park Point along Lake Superior. When the library closed in 1980, the windows were moved to the Duluth Depot. In 2011, the windows were loaned to the St. Louis County Historical Society.

== See also ==
- List of Carnegie libraries in Minnesota
- National Register of Historic Places listings in St. Louis County, Minnesota
