= Browns Valley Carnegie Library =

- Browns Valley Carnegie Public Library
- U.S. National Register of Historic Places
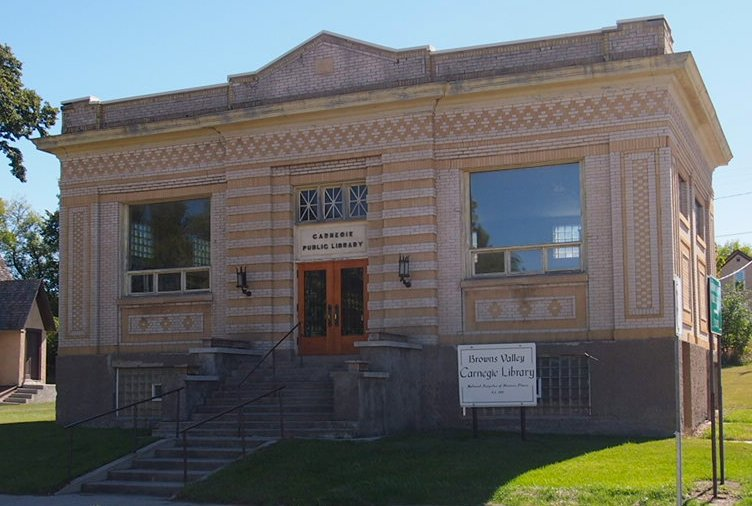
- The Browns Valley Carnegie Library from the north-northwest

- Location within Minnesota Location within the United States
- Location: Broadway Avenue & 2nd Street, Browns Valley, Minnesota
- Coordinates: 45°35′42″N 96°49′51″W
- Area: Less than one acre
- Built: 1915–16
- Built by: McClure Construction Company
- Architectural style: Neoclassical
- NRHP reference No.: 85001762
- Designated: August 15, 1985

The Browns Valley Carnegie Library is a Carnegie library building in Browns Valley, Minnesota, United States, completed in 1916. It was listed on the National Register of Historic Places in 1985 as the Browns Valley Carnegie Public Library for having local significance in the themes of architecture and education. It was nominated for being the town's most architecturally significant early-20th-century building and an example of the libraries provided to small Minnesota communities by Andrew Carnegie's philanthropy.

The Browns Valley Public Library operated out of the building until 1997, when it moved to a new facility. Since then the Browns Valley Historical Society has used it for storage.

== See also ==
- List of Carnegie libraries in Minnesota
- National Register of Historic Places listings in Traverse County, Minnesota
