= Duluth Art Institute =

The Duluth Art Institute (DAI) is a contemporary, fine art and cultural institution that specializes in contemporary art from the Twin Ports Region and the Upper Midwest. It was founded in Duluth in 1907 and is one of the oldest art centers in the U.S. state of Minnesota. Based on the curatorial model of the German "kunsthalle", the DAI is a community arts center that works closely with artists and the community, creating associated symposia, workshops, and studios.

The Duluth Art Institute has two locations. The main exhibition space is located in the Duluth Depot, the historic train station in Duluth that also houses the Lake Superior Railroad Museum, the St. Louis County Historical Society Museum, a Veteran's Memorial Hall, and several performing arts organizations. A second location is situated in the former Lincoln Branch Library, a 1915 Carnegie library building in the Lincoln Park neighborhood. It serves as a community center for arts education and houses multipurpose classroom spaces, a darkroom, ceramics studios, a fiber studio, and professional development services for artists.

== History ==
The Duluth Art Institute originated as an art club established by Bishop McGolrick in 1897. In 1907, the Duluth Art Association was officially incorporated. The original Board of Trustees included G.G. Hartley and Chester Adgate Congdon. In the 1930s, the Duluth Art Institute Association, a separate arts organization, was active. The organizations merged in 1946, retaining the name Duluth Art Institute Association. The organization later dropped the Association from their name. In 1976, the Duluth Art Institute relocated to the St. Louis County Heritage and Arts Center. The arts organization opened an additional location in the old Lincoln branch library in 1993.

The Duluth Art Institute hosts a biennial that dates back to 1919. Formerly called the Arrowhead Art Exhibit, it is now known as the Arrowhead Biennial Exhibition.

In 1990, the DAI auctioned off the eight paintings in its permanent collection because it was not equipped to care for the works. The paintings included pieces by Knute Heldner, Henri de Toulouse-Lautrec, Charles Rosen, and David Ericson. The auction was criticized by the St. Louis County Historical Society and residents who wanted the art to stay in the community.

== Artist residency ==
In March 2017, The Duluth Art Institute started an artist-in-residence program. The first artist to participate in the program was Duluth-based Paul LaJeunesse. The current artist-in-residence is painter Adam Swanson, who is working on a Public Art project to be unveiled in the summer of 2018.
