= Northeast Library =

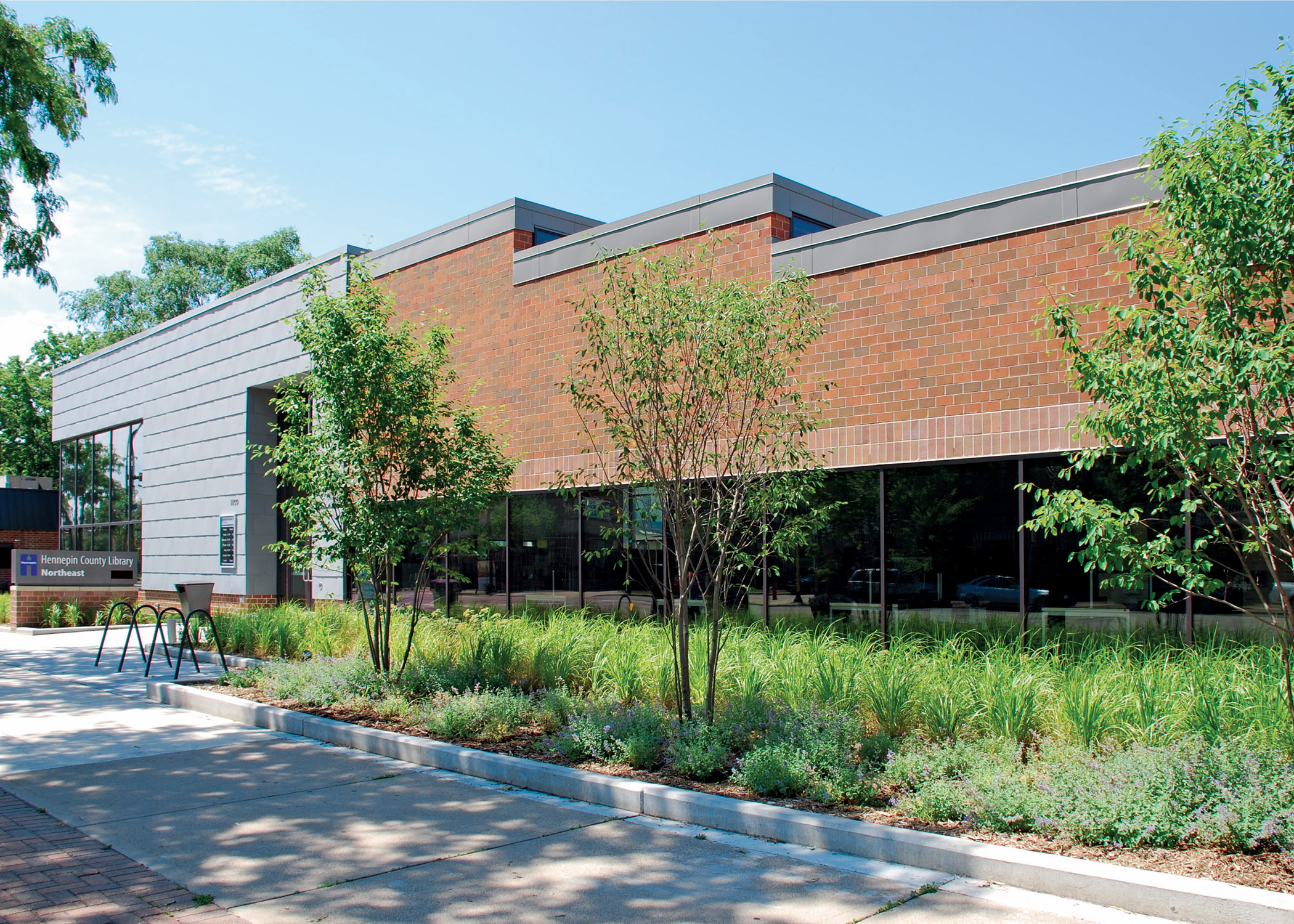

General information
- Address: 2200 Central Avenue Northeast
- Town or city: Minneapolis, MN
- Coordinates: 45.0111000°N 93.2501000°W
- Opened: 1973

Northeast Library is a public library in Minneapolis, Minnesota, United States. It is part of the Hennepin County Library system. Since opening in 1973, Northeast Library at 2200 Central Avenue Northeast in Minneapolis serves a vibrant metropolitan community, Northeast, Minneapolis. At 15,275 square feet, the space held about 30,000 books and featured a fireplace to welcome patrons in winter. The 1973 building was itself a replacement for a Carnegie library which was on the site from 1915 until 1972.

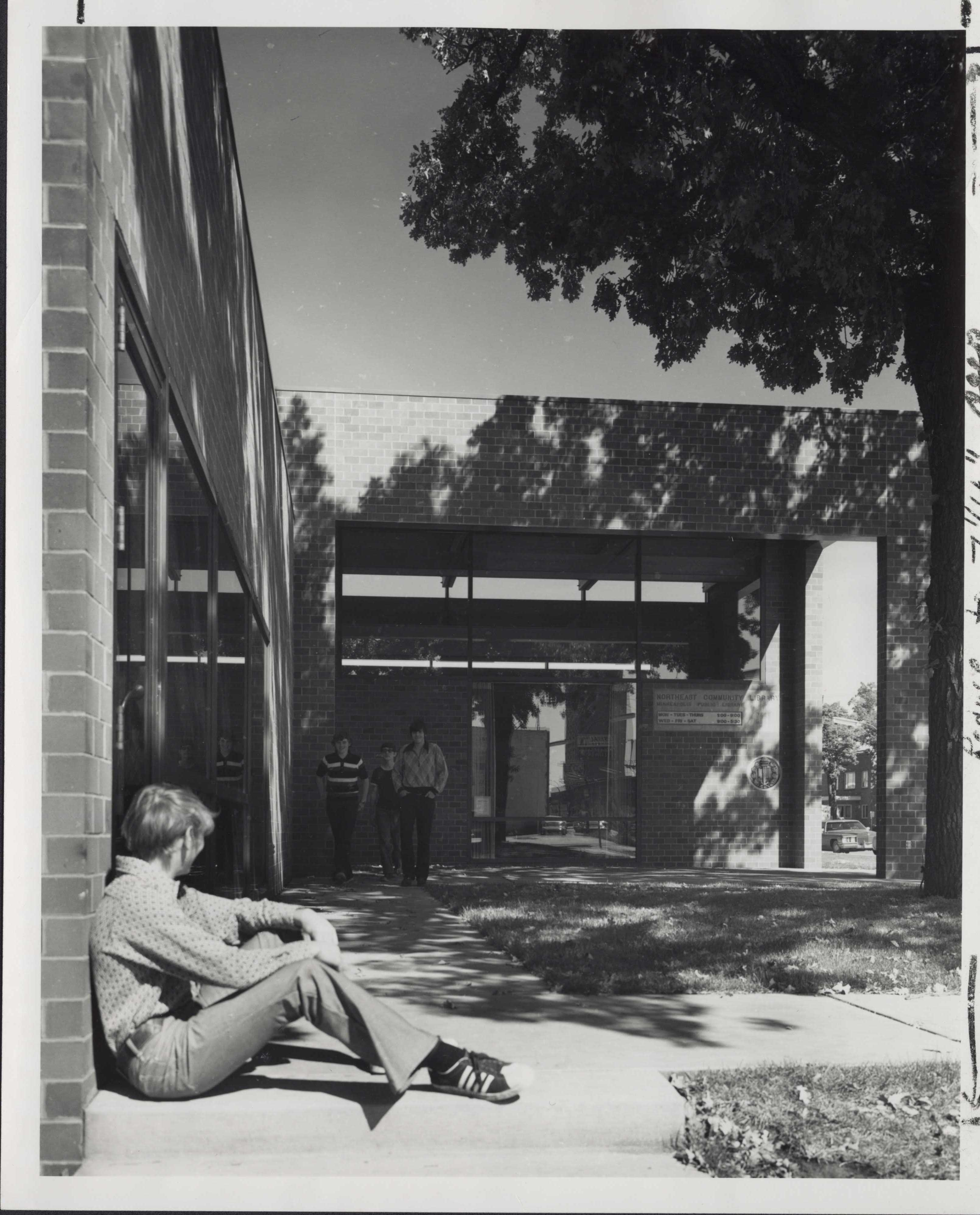
The Northeast Library was built at 2200 Central Avenue N.E. in Minneapolis in 1972 to replace the 1915 Central Ave. branch of Minneapolis Public Library.

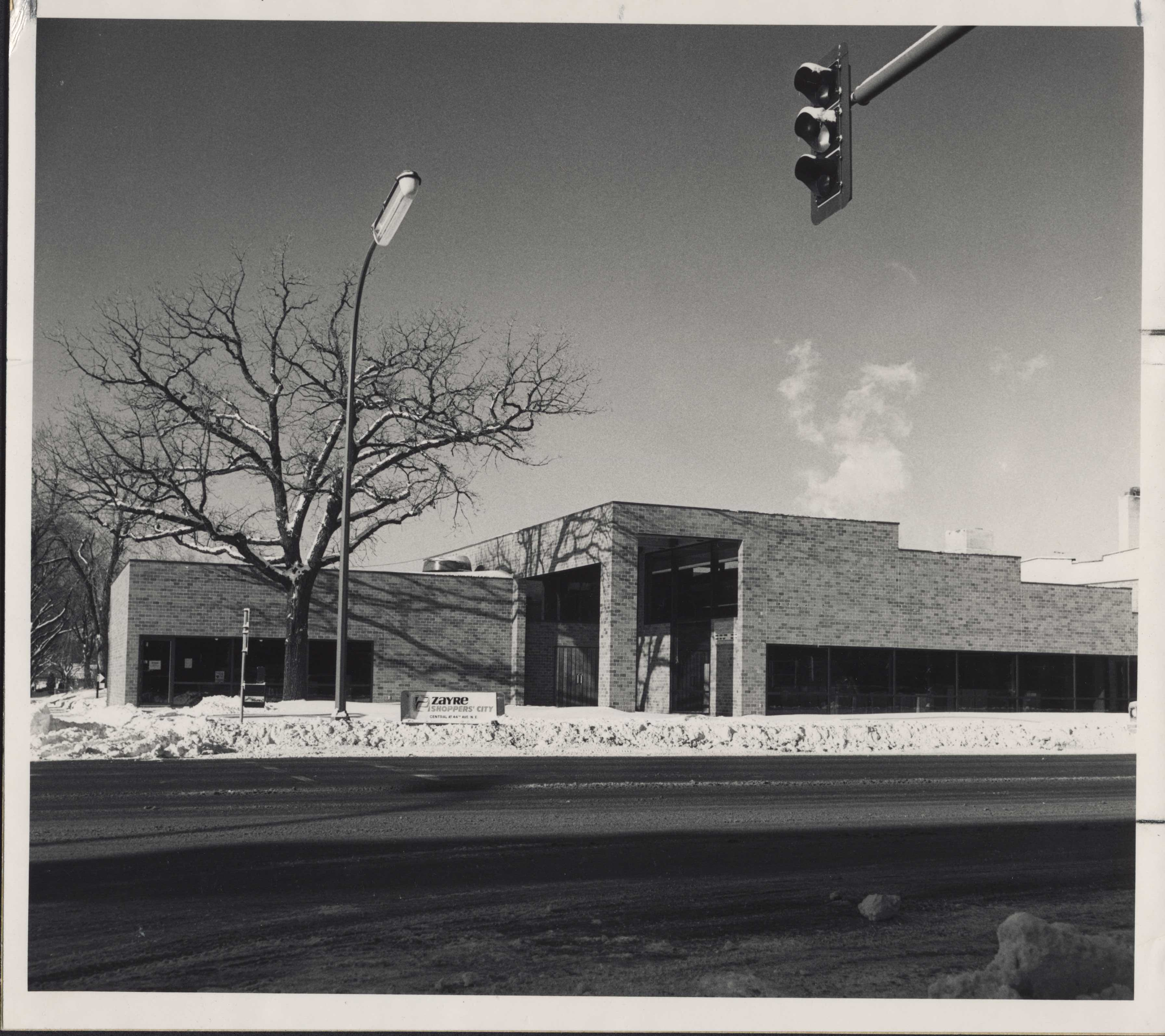
The Northeast Library was built at 2200 Central Avenue N.E. in Minneapolis in 1972 to replace the 1915 Central Ave. branch of Minneapolis Public Library.

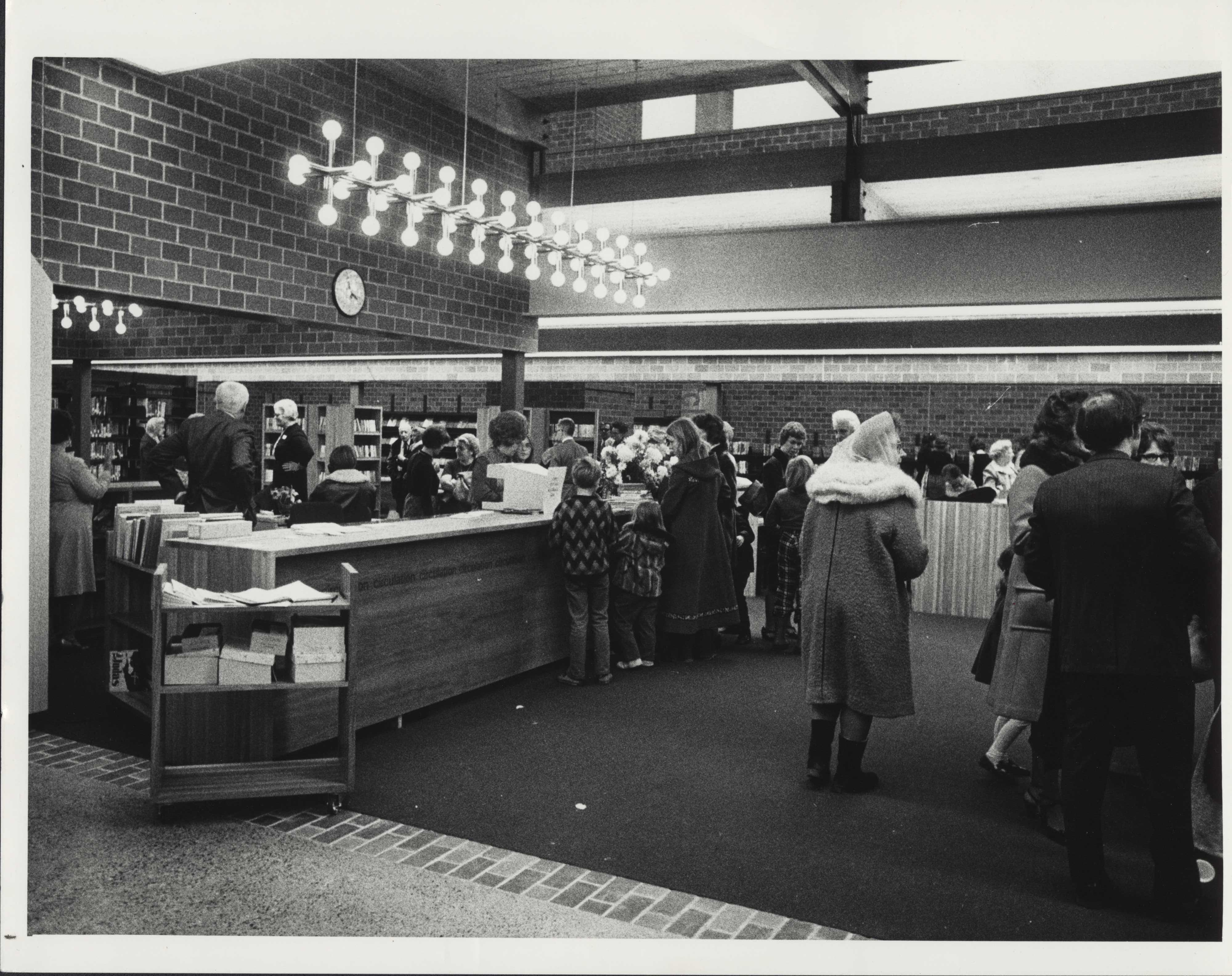
The Northeast Library was built at 2200 Central Avenue N.E. in Minneapolis in 1972 to replace the 1915 Central Ave. branch of Minneapolis Public Library.

== Previous Northeast Minneapolis libraries, 1892–1972 ==
The first library service for the "New Boston" community in Northeast Minneapolis was a deposit station "H," located at Moody's Drug Store, 25th and Central in 1892. In the early 20th century, Gratia Countryman, Director of the Minneapolis Public Library, tracked patron metrics of branch libraries and determined that the New Boston Branch, which had opened in January 1907, was busy enough to warrant moving from a rented space at Central Ave. and 24th Ave. NE into a purpose-built library. The Central Avenue branch, the second of Andrew Carnegie's four libraries in Minneapolis, opened on November 15, 1915 and quickly became one of the most active and important branches of the Minneapolis Public Library System.

The Carnegie building served newly arrived immigrants of German, Polish, and Scandinavian descent, hosted programming for adults, and collaborated with the neighborhood's schools. The branch held weekly story times for children and Americanization classes. Initially, all library services were held on the main floor of the library and the basement held a meeting room and an auditorium, but eventually the children's room was moved to the basement. Mirroring the Minneapolis Public Library's other Carnegie branches, children constituted a significant portion of the library's patronage, and many children who grew up in Northeast Minneapolis before the library was razed, remember the Central Avenue branch as their neighborhood library.

The Central Avenue branch was the only Carnegie library in Minneapolis to be torn down. The building was in very poor condition at several points in its existence, and multiple renovations of the branch in 1936 and 1950 could not keep it from falling into disrepair again by the 1960s. In 1970, Minneapolis Public Library Director Ervin Gaines announced that the cost of renovating the Central Avenue branch was higher than the cost of a new building. The Central Avenue branch was razed in 1972, and in 1973 Northeast Library was dedicated on the same site.

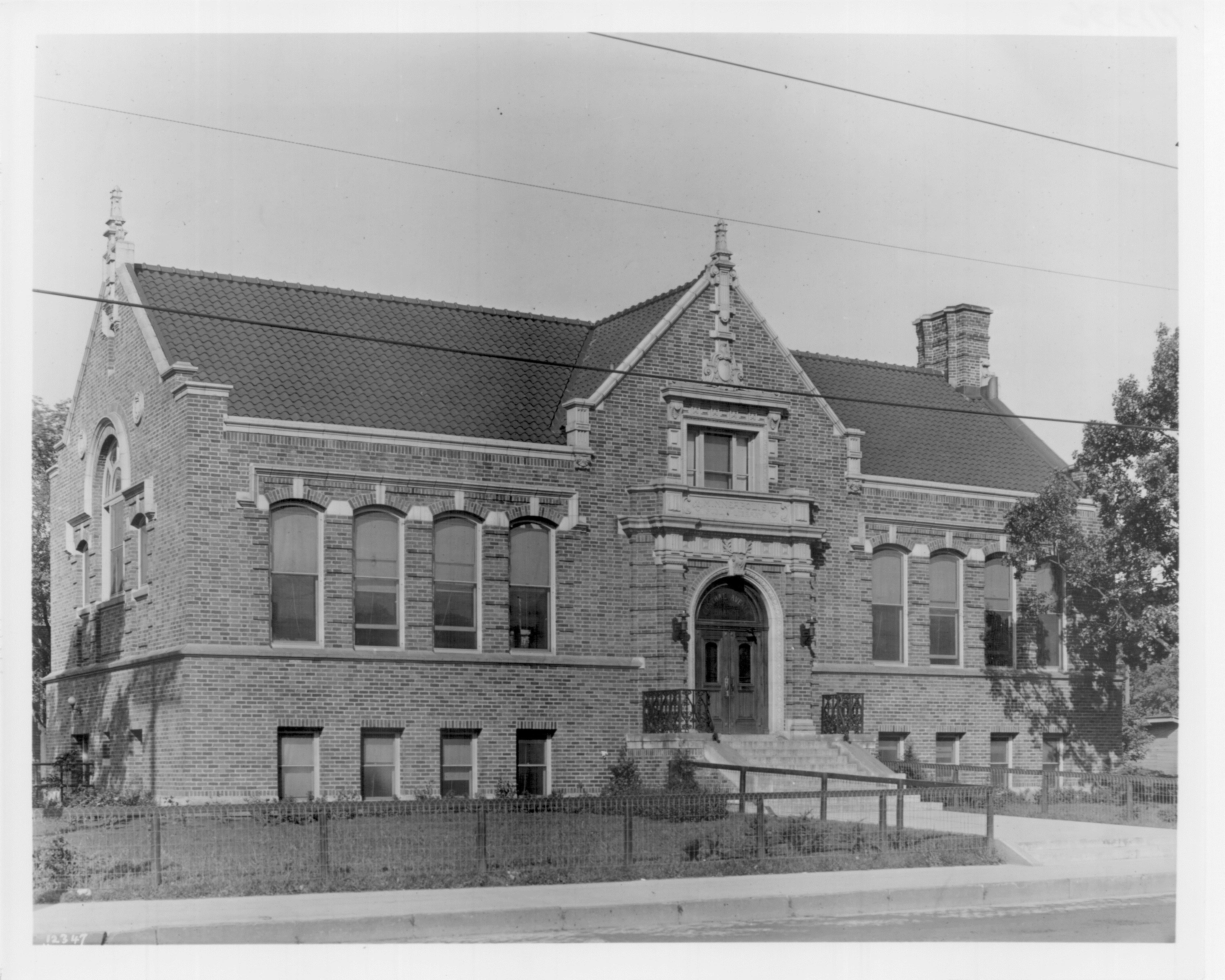
With community support and funds from Andrew Carnegie the Central Avenue Branch of the Minneapolis Library opened on November 15, 1915. It stood until 1972 when it was razed for Northeast Library.

== Updates to the 1973 building ==
Having served its original design for 34 years, Northeast was in need of several updates. The allocation of funds for the remodeling was one of the last votes taken by the former Minneapolis Public Library Board, taken on December 9, 2007, just before the Minneapolis Public and Hennepin County Libraries systems merged. In anticipation of the funding, in 2007 the City of Minneapolis chose Cuningham Group Architecture to design the renovation.

Leadership from the Minneapolis Public Library and Lois Porfiri, the head Northeast Librarian, met with residents of the neighborhoods served by the library, receiving extensive input about the goals of the remodeling. The 2010 Hennepin County Government operating budget details the infrastructure requirements of the building: heating and cooling systems needed to be improved, technology upgrades were necessary, and a new roof was required.

Completed in the spring of 2011 at a cost of $5.2 million, the remodeling included a 2,400 square foot addition to the building. The goal was to make use of ample daylight with the greater use and strategic placement of windows. In addition to the infrastructure repairs and updates, environmentally sound zinc panels are used on a portion of the outside of the building, complementing the original brick facade. Funding for the remodeling came from the City of Minneapolis Library Referendum vote in 2000 ($3.8 million) and Hennepin County ($1.45 million. Accessibility was improved and better use of the space supported the needs of the updated collection and the state-of-the-art technology resources. Wood from the library's beloved oak tree which was felled to make way for the expansion was recycled into tables made by a neighborhood artist for the updated library.

== Neighborhood connections ==
The Friends of the Northeast Library launched in September 2010. The Friends of the Northeast Library sponsors library programs and holds book sales including sales at the Northeast Farmer’s Market. Library programming is offered for community members of all ages, throughout the year. Baby and Family story times are held once a week for young children. The library collaborates with local schools to provide field trip opportunities and promote library services to children and their families.

== Treasures and artists in residence ==
Art in the Library includes a frieze representing the talents of the neighborhood. Measuring 40 feet by 4 feet, it is a collection of images of art by residents of Northeast Minneapolis who are artists. In fact, the Northeast branch is a member of the Northeast Minneapolis Arts Association. Andy Sturdevant has recently been a writer in residence at Northeast Library. Among the unique resources he found at the Northeast branch are a collection of Edison High School's yearbooks dating from 1927, and The Northeaster neighborhood newspaper.
