= Morris Carnegie Library =

- U.S. National Register of Historic Places
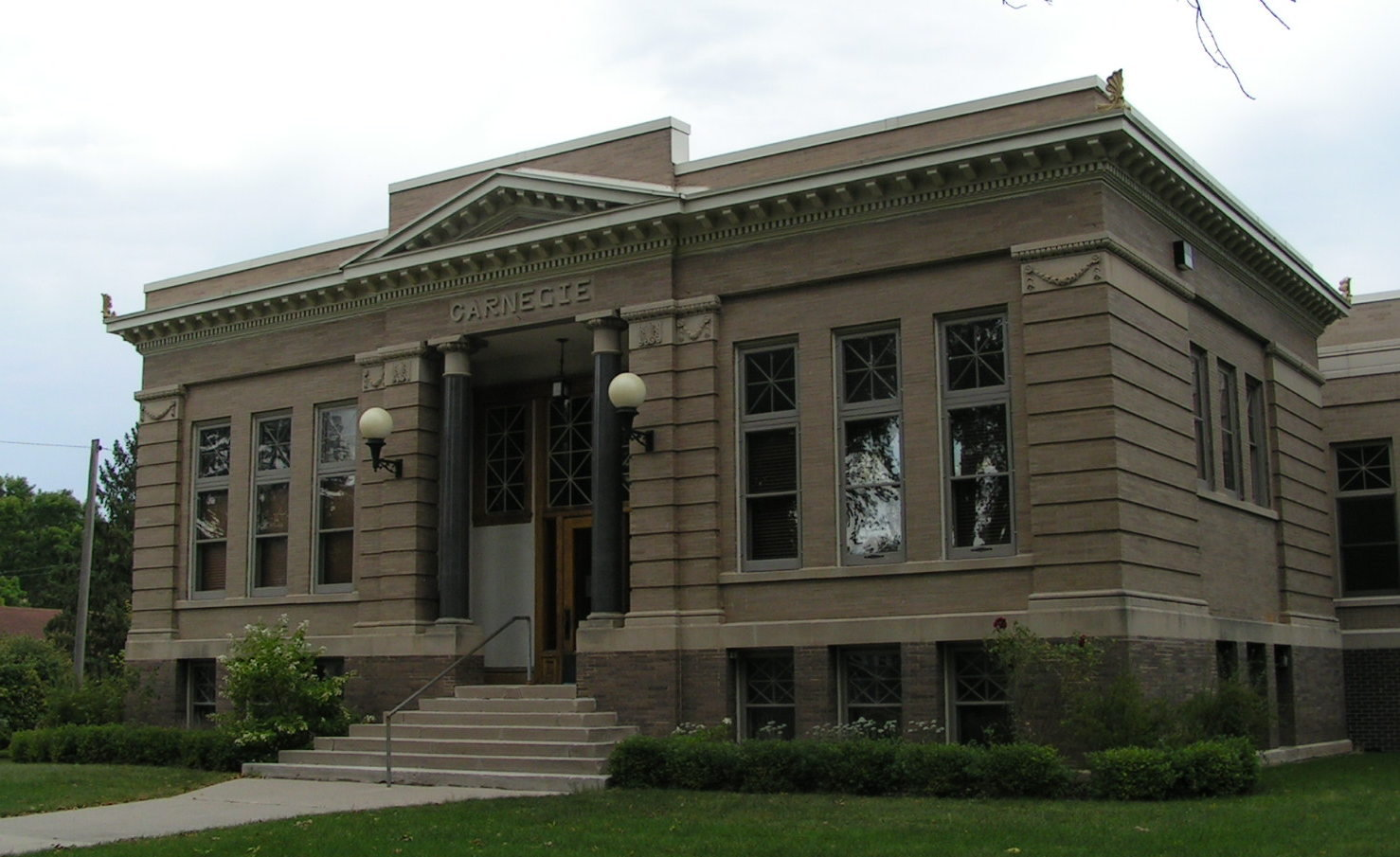
- The Morris Carnegie Library from the east

- Location within Minnesota Location within the United States
- Location: 116 West 6th Street, Morris, Minnesota
- Coordinates: 45°35′8.6″N 95°55′4″W
- Area: Less than one acre
- Built: 1905
- Architect: Sedgwick & Saxton
- Architectural style: Neoclassical
- NRHP reference No.: 83000943
- Added to NRHP: January 27, 1983

The Morris Carnegie Library is a former library building in Morris, Minnesota, United States, now occupied by a historical society. It was built in 1905 as one of the 2,500 Carnegie libraries funded by steel magnate Andrew Carnegie. It was listed on the National Register of Historic Places in 1983 for having local significance in the themes of architecture and education. It was nominated for being a longstanding focus of education in Morris, with locally distinctive and well preserved Neoclassical architecture.

The Morris Public Library relocated to a new facility in 1968. The 1905 Carnegie building has since been maintained by the Stevens County Historical Society as its headquarters and museum.

== See also ==
- List of Carnegie libraries in Minnesota
- List of museums in Minnesota
- National Register of Historic Places listings in Stevens County, Minnesota
