= Two Harbors Carnegie Library =

- U.S. National Register of Historic Places
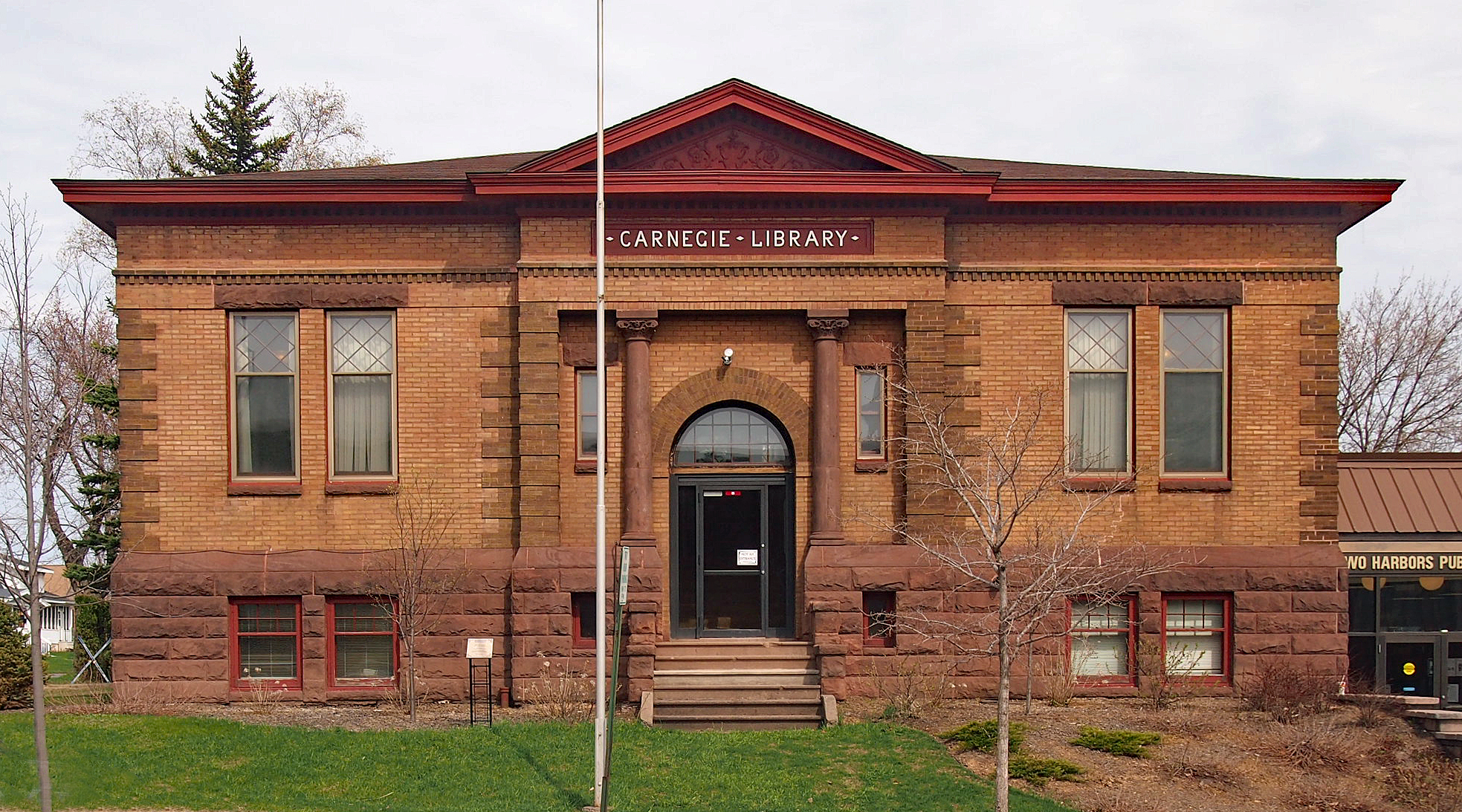
- The Two Harbors Carnegie Library from the west

- Location within Minnesota Location within the United States
- Location: Two Harbors, Minnesota
- Coordinates: 47°1′20.68″N 91°40′14.44″W
- Built: 1909
- Architect: Austin Terryberry
- Architectural style: Classical Revival
- NRHP reference No.: 86002121
- Added to NRHP: July 31, 1986

The Two Harbors Carnegie Library, located at 320 Waterfront Avenue, Two Harbors, Minnesota, United States, is a public library building built in 1909 with a $15,000 grant from Andrew Carnegie. This was one of over 3,000 libraries in 47 states funded by Carnegie. It was built in the Classical Revival style with brick and sandstone.
