= Austin Public Library (Minnesota) =

Library in Minnesota, United States

- 43.670651°N 92.971115°W
- Location: 323 4th Ave. NE; Austin, MN 55912-3773
- Established: 1884

Collection
- Size: 103,000

Access and use
- Population served: 30,000

Other information
- Director: Julie Clinefelter
- Website: www.aplmn.org

The Austin Public Library is a public library in Austin, Minnesota. It is a member of Southeastern Libraries Cooperating, the SE Minnesota library region.

== History ==
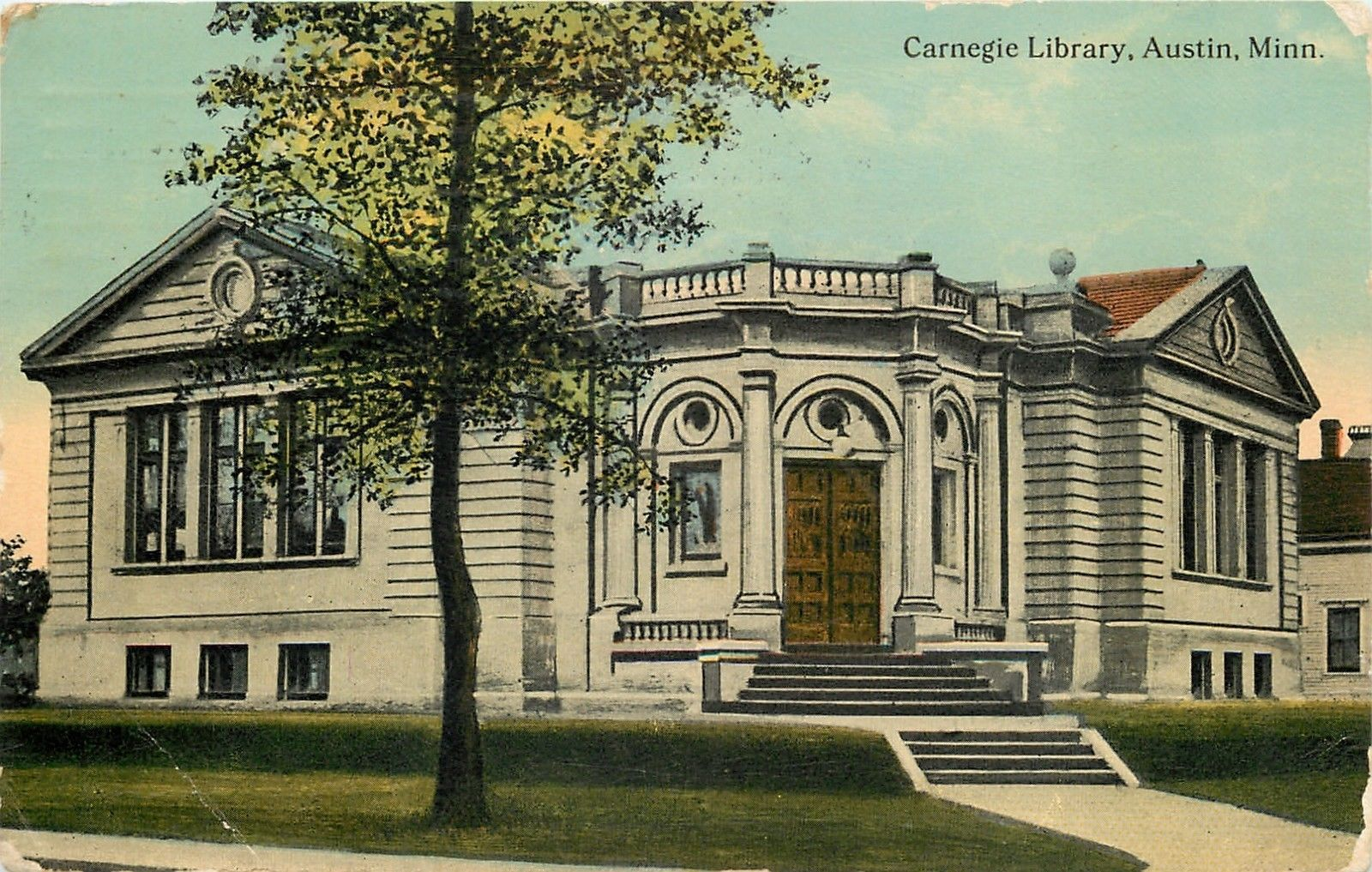
The original Carnegie Library in Austin

The library began in 1884 out of the basement of the Mower County courthouse. By the turn of the century there became an increased need in more library space so the city of Austin reached out to Andrew Carnegie to petition for funds for a new building. An initial request for $25,000 was turned down and replaced with an offer of $12,000. Citing a growth in population the city requested more, and on October 3, 1901, Carnegie agreed to donate $15,000 with the stipulation the city agree to pay a $1,500 annual upkeep and maintenance fee on the building. Upon its completion the Austin Ladies' Floral Club donated 3,425 of the volumes in its own library to the new Carnegie library.

The Carnegie building was the main public library of Austin until its replacement in 1996.
