= Duluth Public Library =

Library in Minnesota, USA

Coordinates: 46.7827778°N 92.1063889°W

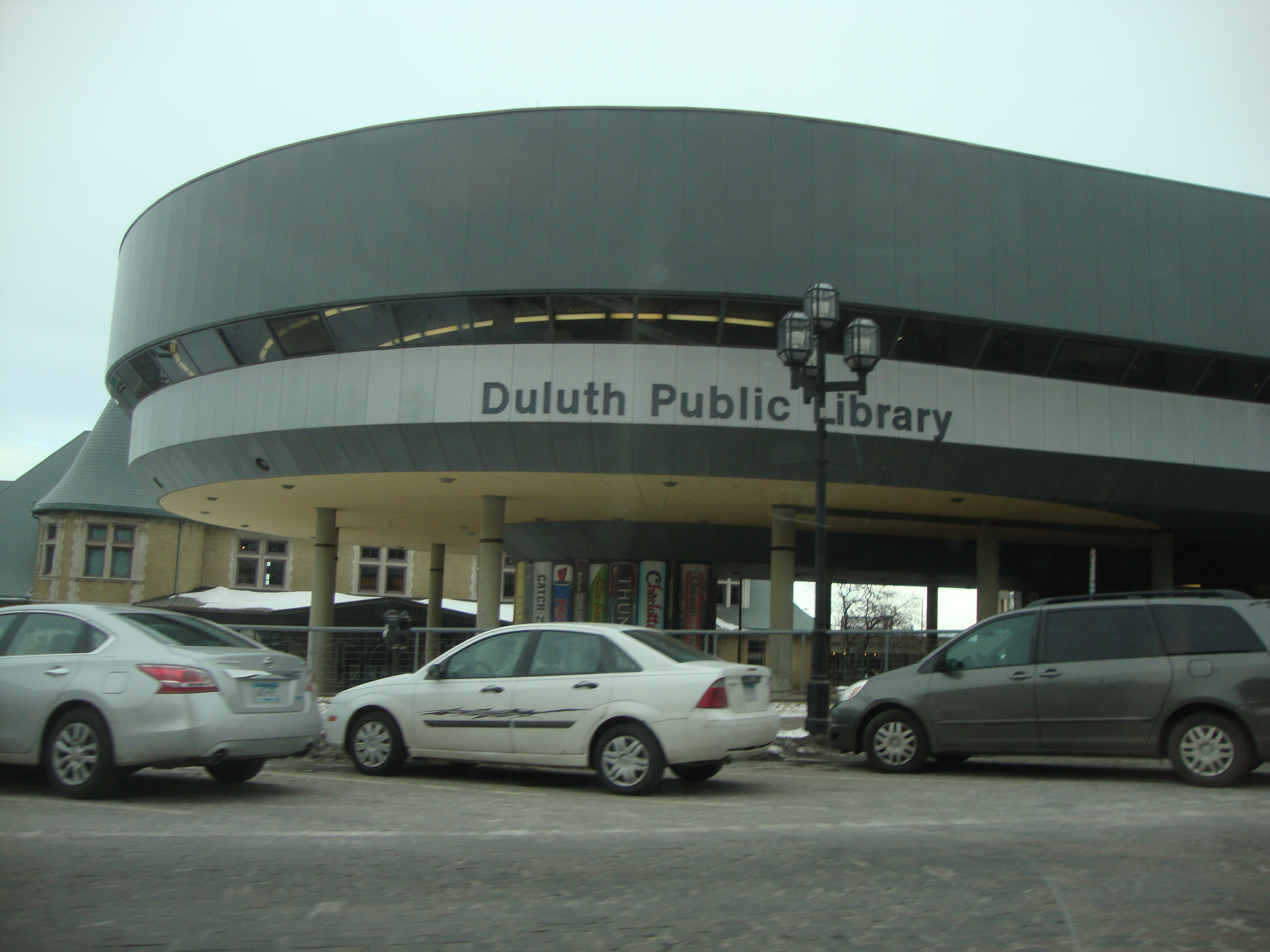
- Duluth Public Library
- Location: Duluth, Minnesota, United States
- Established: 1980
- Branches: 3

Collection
- Size: 413,586

Access and use
- Population served: 86,319

Other information
- Director: Carla Powers
- Public transit access: Duluth Transit Authority
- Website: Duluth Public Library

The Duluth Public Library is a library in downtown Duluth, Minnesota. It is a part of the Arrowhead Library System and serves a population of 86,319.

== Services ==
The Duluth Public Library’s collection includes books, audiobooks, downloadable e-books and audiobooks, DVDs, CDs, large-print materials, maps, pamphlet files, government documents, newspapers, serials, and microfilm. The library provides free access to computers with Internet access, word processing, classes on computer use, reference database subscriptions, children’s games, and printers. Free wireless Internet access is also available.

Other services include interlibrary loan, and research and reference help.

== History ==
In 1980, a new Duluth Public Library building opened at 520 W. Superior Street. At this time, library services moved from the previous location, the Duluth's Carnegie library built in 1902. Architect Gunnar Birkerts designed the new building. In 2008, the building was renovated, including an expanded computer lab, new carpeting throughout, and new furniture. Later that year, Duluth Mayor Don Ness made extensive cuts to the city budget, and as a result, library employees were laid off and hours were reduced. A referendum was passed in 2011 that changed the way Duluth's city parks were funded and thereby freeing up funds to restore library hours and staff. Currently, the main library is open six days a week (five days a week during the summer), and each of the branches is open five days a week.

In July 2009, the Bill & Melinda Gates Foundation gave the Duluth Public Library an Opportunity Online Hardware Grant to be used for the purchase of new computers. The grant required that the library and community raise matching funds within two years. The Friends of the Duluth Public Library began an active fundraising campaign. Between public donations and a grant from the John S. and James L. Foundation, matching funds were raised.

== Special Collections ==
- The Duluth Collection includes books by or about Duluth residents, as well as materials on local history, politics, architecture, business, and education.
- The Minnesota Collection includes books by Minnesota authors, as well as materials related to Minnesota and Lake Superior.
- Views of Duluth is a collection of William Norman's framed lithographs depicting scenes of Duluth.
- Book Club in a Bag is a collection of book club kits that each include ten copies of a book and a study guide.
- The Toy Collection is an assortment of games, toys, and flash cards available for circulation.

== Programs and events ==
- One Book Northland is a community reading project that encourages citizens to read a particular book. A committee chooses a new book each year and the library plans supplementary programs and lectures.
- Storytimes for children are held weekly.
- Annual Used Book Sale is organized by the Friends of the Duluth Public Library to raise money for library programs and materials.
- Kaleidoscope is a series of entertainment programs for children, held on the Library Plaza every summer.
- Tax Preparation Help is provided every year by accounting students from the University of Minnesota-Duluth.
- The Olga Walker Awards celebrate those who have made a significant contributions to the foundation and library.

== Locations ==
- Main Library

520 W. Superior St.

- Mt. Royal Branch

105 Mt. Royal Shopping Circle

- West Duluth Branch

5830 Grand Avenue

== 2011 statistics ==
- Circulation: 902,221
- Number of visits: 376,817
- Reference questions answered: 79,443
- Total number of materials: 463,418

== 2021 statistics ==
- Circulation: 549,697
- Number of visits: 140,997
- Reference questions answered: 17,108
- Total number of materials: 407,845
