= Northfield Public Library =

Public library in Northfield, Minnesota

Coordinates: 44°27′28″N 93°09′32″W

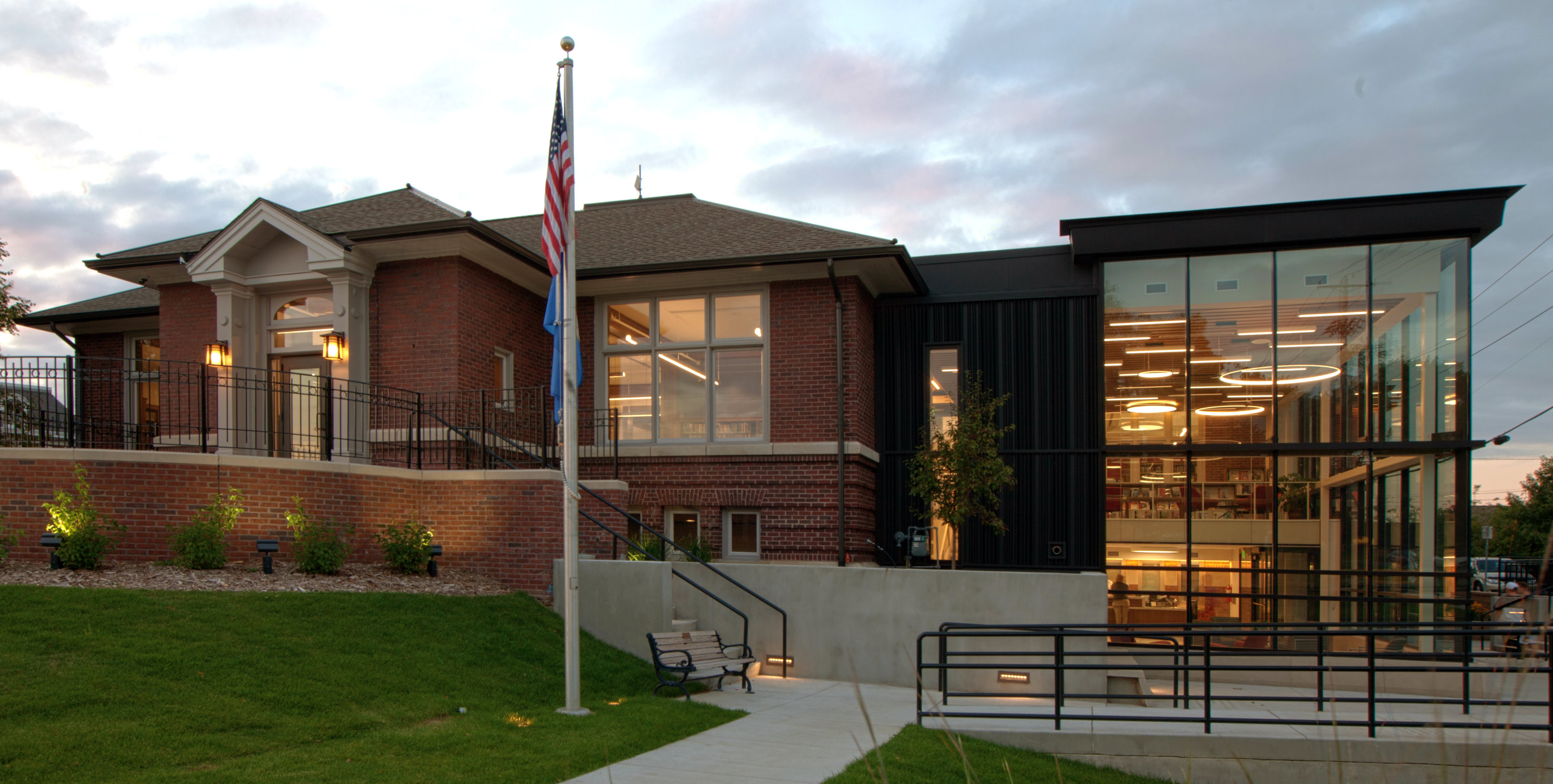
- Northfield Public Library
- Location: 210 Washington; Northfield MN 55057

Collection
- Size: 89,000

Access and use
- Circulation: 395,266
- Population served: 31,747

Other information
- Budget: $960,000
- Director: Natalie Draper
- Website: http://mynpl.org

The Northfield Public Library is a public library in Northfield, Minnesota. It is a member of Southeastern Libraries Cooperating, of the Southeast Minnesota library region. The Carnegie Library was built in 1910 with a major addition built in 1985. The library was renovated from 2015 to 2016, with library services moving temporarily to City Hall during that time. The library reopened in its original location on Saturday, May 7, 2016.

== History ==
In 1908, the City of Northfield was awarded a $10,000 grant by Andrew Carnegie to build and maintain a free public library, on which construction began in 1909. The library opened to the public on April 25, 1910, and immediately began lending its collection of nearly 5,200 items. Located in the center of town, the library provided Northfield with a central community space as well as a quiet place to read and borrow books. Throughout the first half of the 20th century, the library made improvements including the addition of a card index for local newspaper, a repository for historical materials, and the creation of a popular "Story Hour" for children.

Between 1950 and 1980, Northfield continued to grow and expand its collection to include materials like records, cassette tapes, and videos. Its well regarded children's department grew as well with new programs and added materials. Circulation and visitors both increased dramatically as the library struggled to find space to accommodate them. The building's accessibility issues also added limits to potential visitors. Minor renovations occurred throughout the 60s and 70s, but it wasn't until the mid-1980s that the library was able to expand. With help from the League of Women Voters, library staff successfully campaigned to pass a bonding referendum to add to the facility. In 1985, the library reopened with an additional 8,000 square feet and room for thousands of new materials.

By 2009, nearly 75 percent of area residents had a library card, more than 400,000 items were checked out yearly, and roughly 600 people came through the doors every day. With these numbers and demand, the library began to explore the possibility of another addition. Under new director Teresa Jensen, the city and private fundraising efforts agreed upon a $3.1 million renovation to address structural and spatial issues. This created a spacious atrium on the Washington St. side of the building, modernized much of the building's infrastructure, and added new computers. Natalie Draper was named the director in 2021.

== About ==
Today the library has nearly 15,000 square feet, 16 public computers, free wireless internet, a genealogy area, two public meeting rooms, and access to numerous databases and e-library services. Three book clubs: Contemporary Women's Authors, Science-Fiction, and Mystery, are held monthly and are run by library staff. The library also offers technology assistance, proctoring services, notary services, and interlibrary loan. Children's storytimes are generally held weekly and both children's and adult programming occur throughout the year.
