= Spring Valley Public Library =

- U.S. National Register of Historic Places
- Spring Valley Public Library

- Location within Minnesota Location within the United States
- Location: 121 E. Jefferson St. Spring Valley MN 55975
- Coordinates: 43°41′19.5″N 92°23′22.5″W
- Built: 1904
- Architect: H. J. Amlic
- Architectural style: Beaux-Arts
- MPS: Fillmore County MRA
- NRHP reference No.: 82002951
- Added to NRHP: April 27, 1982

The Spring Valley Public Library is a library in Spring Valley, Minnesota. It is a member of Southeastern Libraries Cooperating, the SE Minnesota library region.

The building, an example of Beaux Arts Classicism, is listed on the National Register of Historic Places. It is a single-story brick building on a raised Kasota stone basement. It was completed in 1904 with funding from an $8,000 Carnegie grant.
