= Spring Valley, Minnesota =

City in Minnesota, United States

Spring Valley
- City
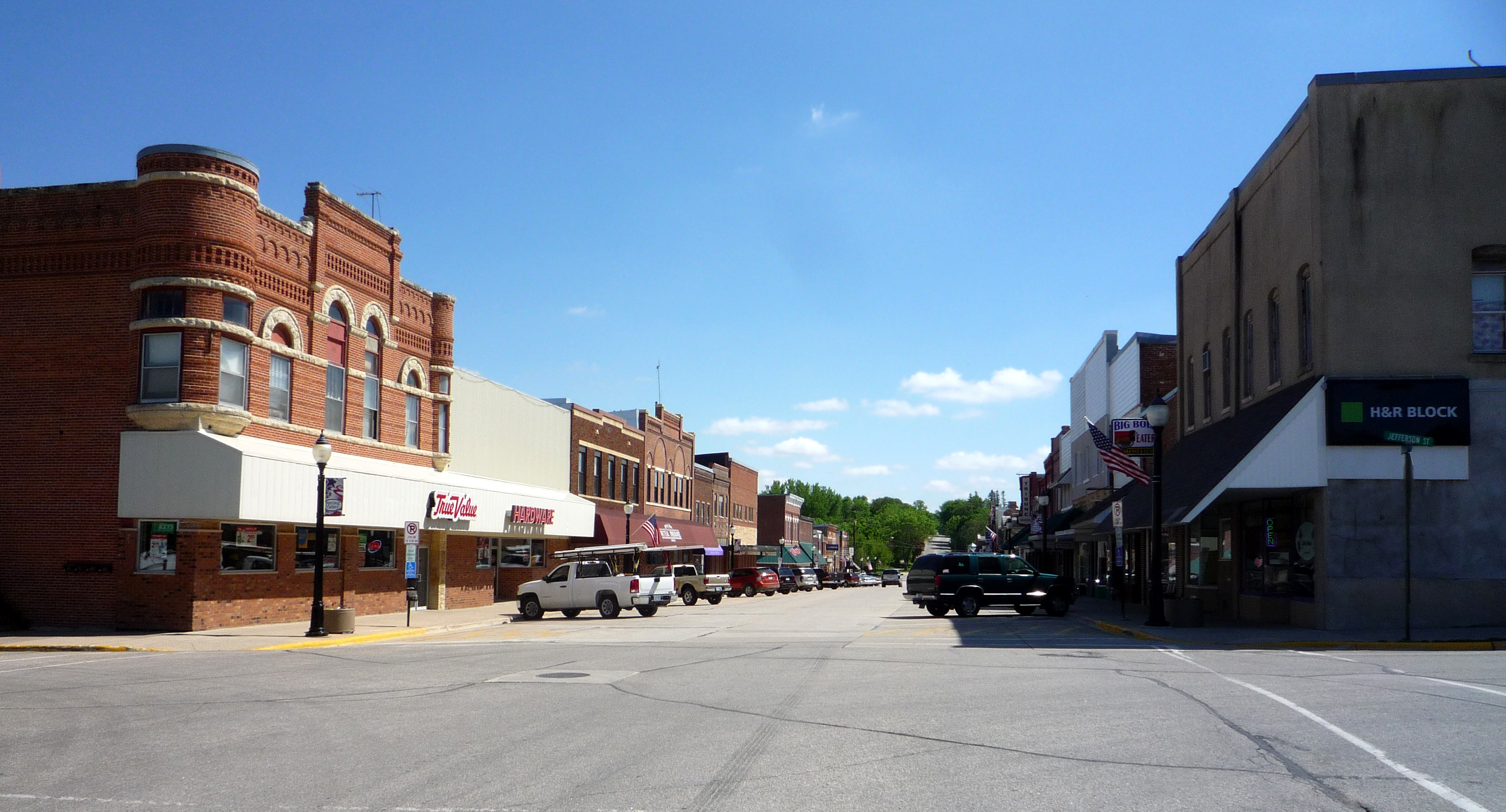
- Downtown Spring Valley
- Nickname: The Valley
- Location of Spring Valley within Fillmore County and state of Minnesota
- Coordinates: 43°41′25″N 92°23′21″W
- Country: United States
- State: Minnesota
- County: Fillmore

Area
  - Total: 2.96 sq mi (7.66 km^{2})
  - Land: 2.96 sq mi (7.66 km^{2})
  - Water: 0 sq mi (0.00 km^{2})
- Elevation: 1,276 ft (389 m)

Population (2020)
  - Total: 2,447
  - Density: 827.3/sq mi (319.44/km^{2})
- Time zone: UTC-6 (Central (CST))
  - Summer (DST): UTC-5 (CDT)
- ZIP code: 55975
- Area code: 507
- FIPS code: 27-62104
- GNIS feature ID: 2395937
- Website: www.springvalley-mn.com

Spring Valley is a city in Fillmore County, Minnesota, United States. The population was 2,447 at the 2020 census.

== History ==
Spring Valley was laid out in 1855, and named for a spring near the town site. A post office has been in operation at Spring Valley since 1855. Spring Valley was incorporated in 1872.

== Geography ==
According to the United States Census Bureau, the city has an area of 2.53 square miles (6.55 km^{2}), all land. U.S. Route 63 and Minnesota State Highway 16 are two of the town's main routes.

== Demographics ==
Historical population
Census	Pop.	Note	%±
1880	1,256		—
1890	1,381		10.0%
1900	1,770		28.2%
1910	1,817		2.7%
1920	1,871		3.0%
1930	1,712		−8.5%
1940	2,133		24.6%
1950	2,467		15.7%
1960	2,628		6.5%
1970	2,572		−2.1%
1980	2,616		1.7%
1990	2,461		−5.9%
2000	2,518		2.3%
2010	2,479		−1.5%
2020	2,447		−1.3%
U.S. Decennial Census

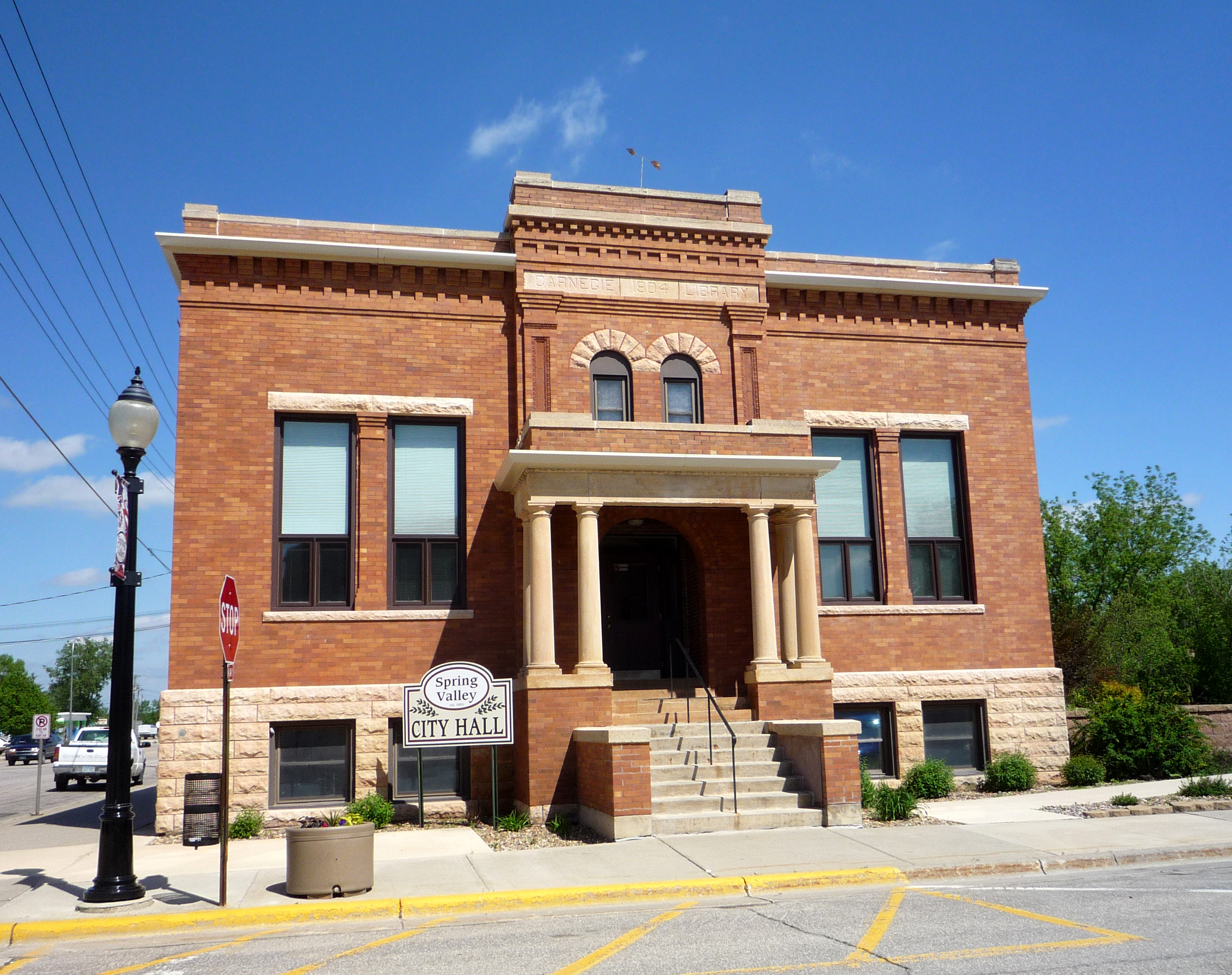
Spring Valley City Hall was originally built in 1904 as a Carnegie library.

=== 2020 census ===
As of the 2020 census, Spring Valley had a population of 2,447. The median age was 41.4 years. 21.9% of residents were under the age of 18 and 21.5% of residents were 65 years of age or older. For every 100 females there were 94.5 males, and for every 100 females age 18 and over there were 95.0 males age 18 and over.

0.0% of residents lived in urban areas, while 100.0% lived in rural areas.

There were 1,079 households in Spring Valley, of which 26.1% had children under the age of 18 living in them. Of all households, 43.3% were married-couple households, 21.6% were households with a male householder and no spouse or partner present, and 27.2% were households with a female householder and no spouse or partner present. About 36.6% of all households were made up of individuals and 15.6% had someone living alone who was 65 years of age or older.

There were 1,148 housing units, of which 6.0% were vacant. The homeowner vacancy rate was 0.6% and the rental vacancy rate was 7.5%.

Racial composition as of the 2020 census
Race	Number	Percent
White	2,312	94.5%
Black or African American	26	1.1%
American Indian and Alaska Native	1	0.0%
Asian	11	0.4%
Native Hawaiian and Other Pacific Islander	0	0.0%
Some other race	17	0.7%
Two or more races	80	3.3%
Hispanic or Latino (of any race)	22	0.9%

=== 2010 census ===
As of the census of 2010, there were 2,479 people, 1,074 households, and 651 families living in the city. The population density was 979.8 inhabitants per square mile (378.3/km^{2}). There were 1,172 housing units at an average density of 463.2 per square mile (178.8/km^{2}). The racial makeup of the city was 97.6% White, 0.6% African American, 0.1% Native American, 0.5% Asian, 0.1% from other races, and 1.0% from two or more races. Hispanic or Latino of any race were 0.7% of the population.

There were 1,074 households, of which 31.1% had children under the age of 18 living with them, 45.6% were married couples living together, 10.5% had a female householder with no husband present, 4.5% had a male householder with no wife present, and 39.4% were non-families. 35.2% of all households were made up of individuals, and 16.7% had someone living alone who was 65 years of age or older. The average household size was 2.27 and the average family size was 2.90.

The median age in the city was 39.5 years. 23.8% of residents were under the age of 18; 8.4% were between the ages of 18 and 24; 24.2% were from 25 to 44; 24.8% were from 45 to 64; and 19% were 65 years of age or older. The gender makeup of the city was 48.8% male and 51.2% female.

=== 2000 census ===
As of the census of 2000, there were 2,518 people, 1,026 households, and 662 families living in the city. The population density was 1,003.3 inhabitants per square mile (387.4/km^{2}). There were 1,090 housing units at an average density of 434.3 per square mile (167.7/km^{2}). The racial makeup of the city was 98.93% White, 0.08% African American, 0.24% Native American, 0.08% Asian, 0.04% from other races, and 0.64% from two or more races. Hispanic or Latino of any race were 0.44% of the population.

There were 1,026 households, out of which 32.4% had children under the age of 18 living with them, 51.3% were married couples living together, 10.0% had a female householder with no husband present, and 35.4% were non-families. 30.1% of all households were made up of individuals, and 14.7% had someone living alone who was 65 years of age or older. The average household size was 2.40 and the average family size was 3.00.

In the city, the population was spread out, with 26.1% under the age of 18, 8.3% from 18 to 24, 25.9% from 25 to 44, 20.4% from 45 to 64, and 19.4% who were 65 years of age or older. The median age was 38. For every 100 females, there were 89.9 males. For every 100 females age 18 and over, there were 87.1 males.

The median income for a household in the city was $32,688, and the median income for a family was $42,468. Males had a median income of $28,438 versus $22,225 for females. The per capita income for the city was $16,735. About 7.4% of families and 8.6% of the population were below the poverty line, including 10.4% of those under age 18 and 12.6% of those age 65 or over.

== Notable people ==
- Richard Sears, founder of Sears, Roebuck and Company, was born in nearby Stewartville and grew up in Spring Valley.
- Almanzo Wilder, husband of Laura Ingalls Wilder, lived on a farm near Spring Valley.

== See also ==
- Spring Valley Public Library
