= Chatfield Public Library =

Public library in Chatfield, Minnesota, US

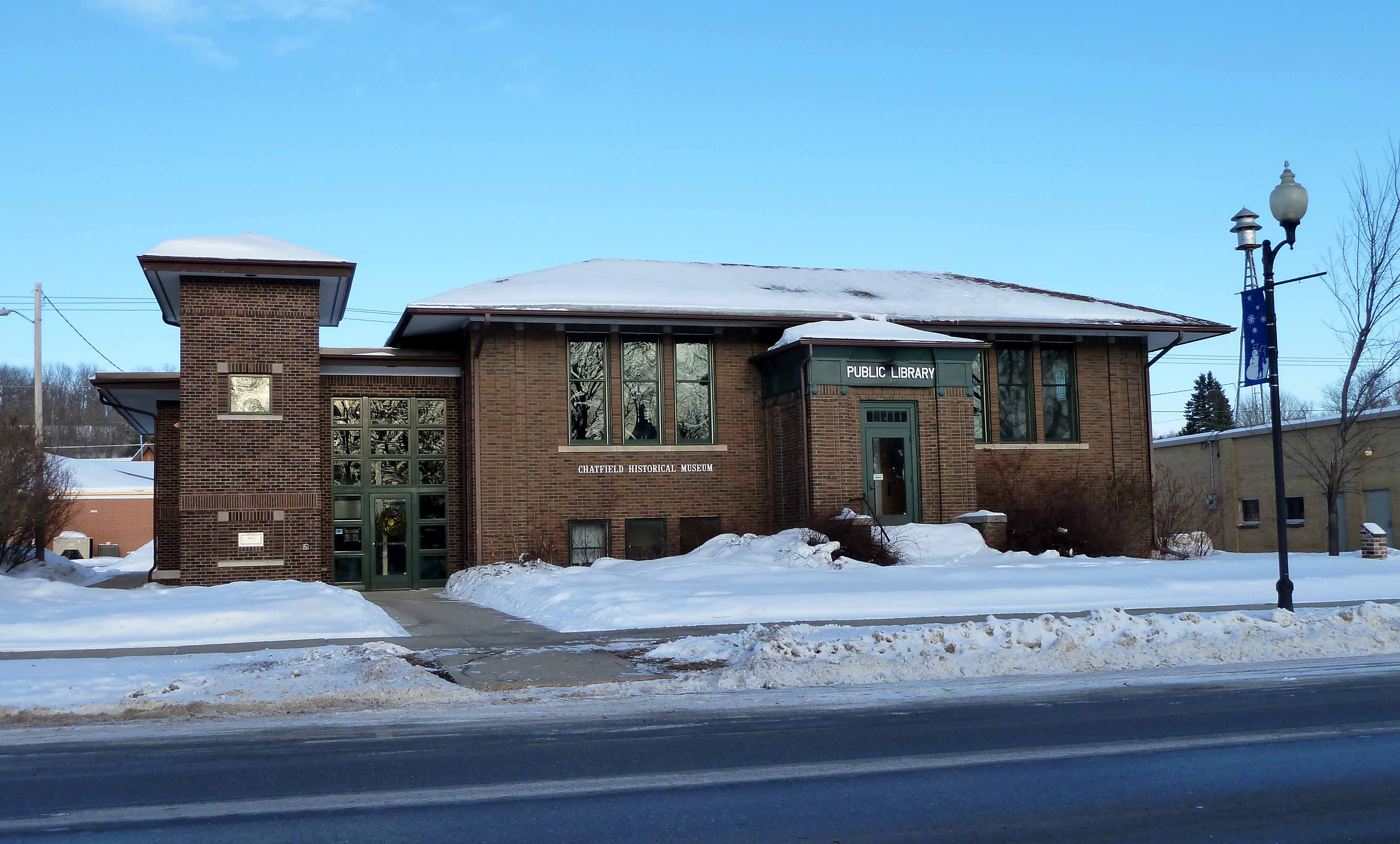
- Chatfield Public Library
- Location: 314 S. Main; Chatfield MN 55923
- Architect: Claude and Starck

Other information
- Director: Monica Erickson
- Website: http://www.chatfieldpubliclibrary.org/

- Chatfield Public Library
- U.S. National Register of Historic Places
- Location within Minnesota Location within the United States
- Location: Main St., Chatfield, Minnesota
- Coordinates: 43°50′41″N 92°11′14″W
- Built: 1913
- Architect: Claude & Starck
- Architectural style: Prairie School
- MPS: Fillmore County MRA
- NRHP reference No.: 82005033
- Added to NRHP: April 27, 1982

The Chatfield Public Library is a public library in Chatfield, Minnesota. It is a member of Southeastern Libraries Cooperating, the SE Minnesota library region.

The building, a Prairie School structure, is listed on the National Register of Historic Places.

== Hours ==
Tuesday 10:00am – 6:30pm
Wednesday 10:00am – 6:30pm
Thursday 10:00am – 8:30pm
Friday 9:00am – 5:00pm
Saturday 9:00am – 2:00pm
