= 2020–2023 Minneapolis–Saint Paul racial unrest =

Series of protests and riots in the U.S. state of Minnesota

- Part of the United States racial unrest (2020–2023)
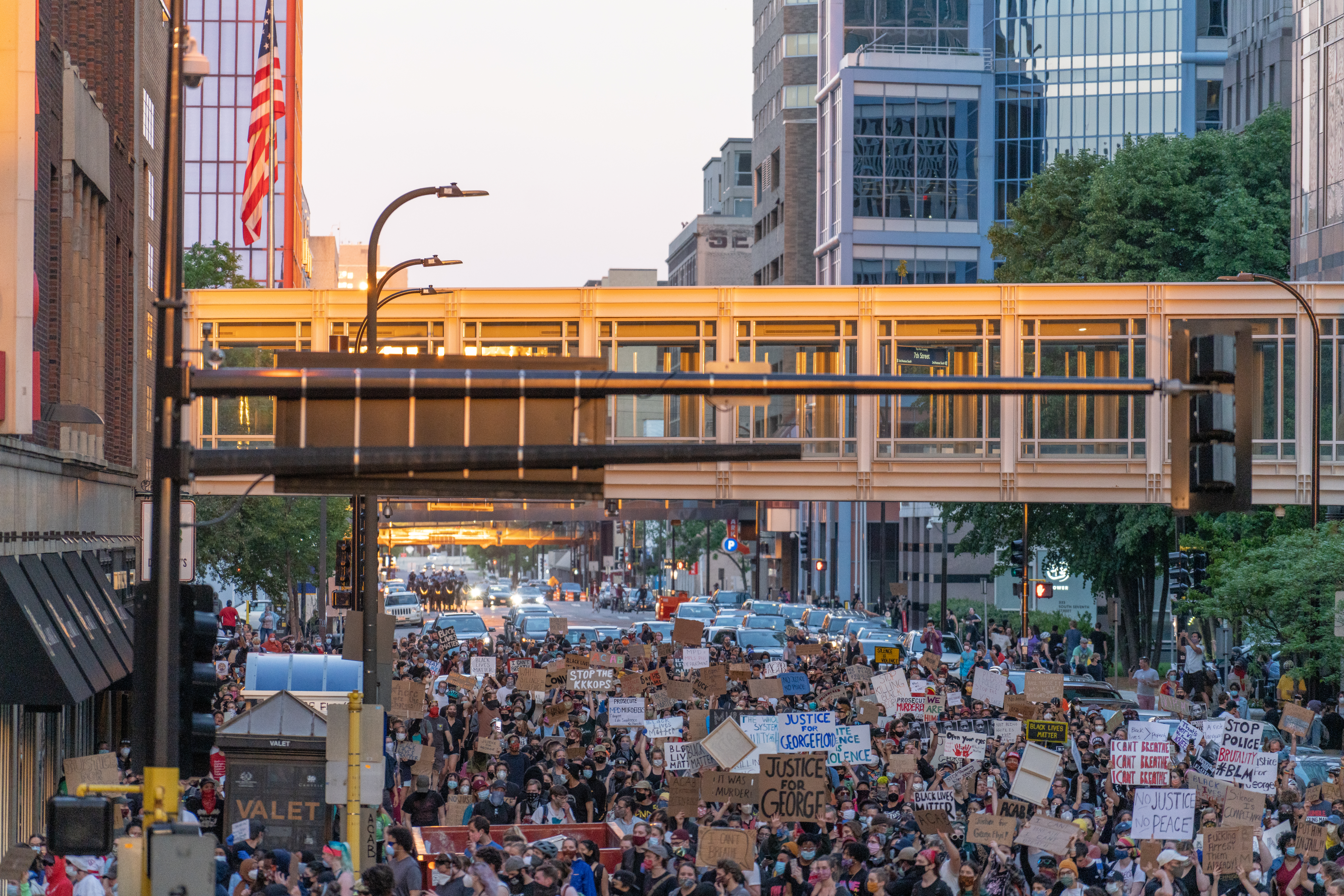
- Protesters march in downtown Minneapolis on May 28, 2020, three days after the murder of George Floyd.
- Date: May 26, 2020 – May 2, 2023 (2 years, 11 months and 1 week)
- Location: Minneapolis and Saint Paul, Minnesota, U.S.
- Caused by: Reaction to the murder of George Floyd by the Minneapolis Police Department; Reaction to other law enforcement killings; Institutional racism against African Americans; Economic, racial and social inequality
- Goals: Justice for George Floyd and others killed as a result of police brutality; End to police brutality; Address historic racial injustice
- Methods: Protests, demonstrations, civil disobedience, civil resistance, riots

Casualties
- Deaths: Calvin Horton Jr. (May 27, 2020); Oscar Lee Stewart Jr. (May 28, 2020); Deona Marie Knajdek (June 13, 2021); Deshaun Hill Jr. (February 9, 2022)
- Damage: $500 million for the period of May 26 to early June 2020

In the early 2020s, the Minneapolis–Saint Paul metropolitan area in the U.S. state of Minnesota experienced a wave of civil unrest, comprising peaceful demonstrations and riots, against systemic racism toward black Americans, notably in the form of police violence. A number of events occurred, beginning soon after the murder of George Floyd, an unarmed black man, by a white Minneapolis police officer on May 25, 2020. National Public Radio characterized the events as cultural reckoning on topics of racial injustice.

Many specific protests over Floyd's murder were described as peaceful events, but Minneapolis–Saint Paul experienced widespread rioting, looting, and property destruction over a three-night period in late May 2020 that resulted in $500 million in property damage, the second-most destructive period of local unrest in U.S. history, after the 1992 Los Angeles riots. Local protests sparked a global protest movement over police brutality and racial justice, and affected state and local policies, local economic conditions, and residents' well-being.

Unrest over Floyd's murder continued as protesters sought justice for Floyd and made broader calls to address structural racism in Minnesota and residents reacted to other incidents, with many protest events part of the larger Black Lives Matter movement. While some demonstrations were violent and generated controversy, protesters from varying backgrounds came to rally against what they perceived as the normalization of the killings of innocent black people.

== Events in 2020 ==
Arrangement is chronological by the beginning date of each notable event series; timelines for some topics overlap.

=== George Floyd protests, May 26, 2020 – May 2, 2023 ===
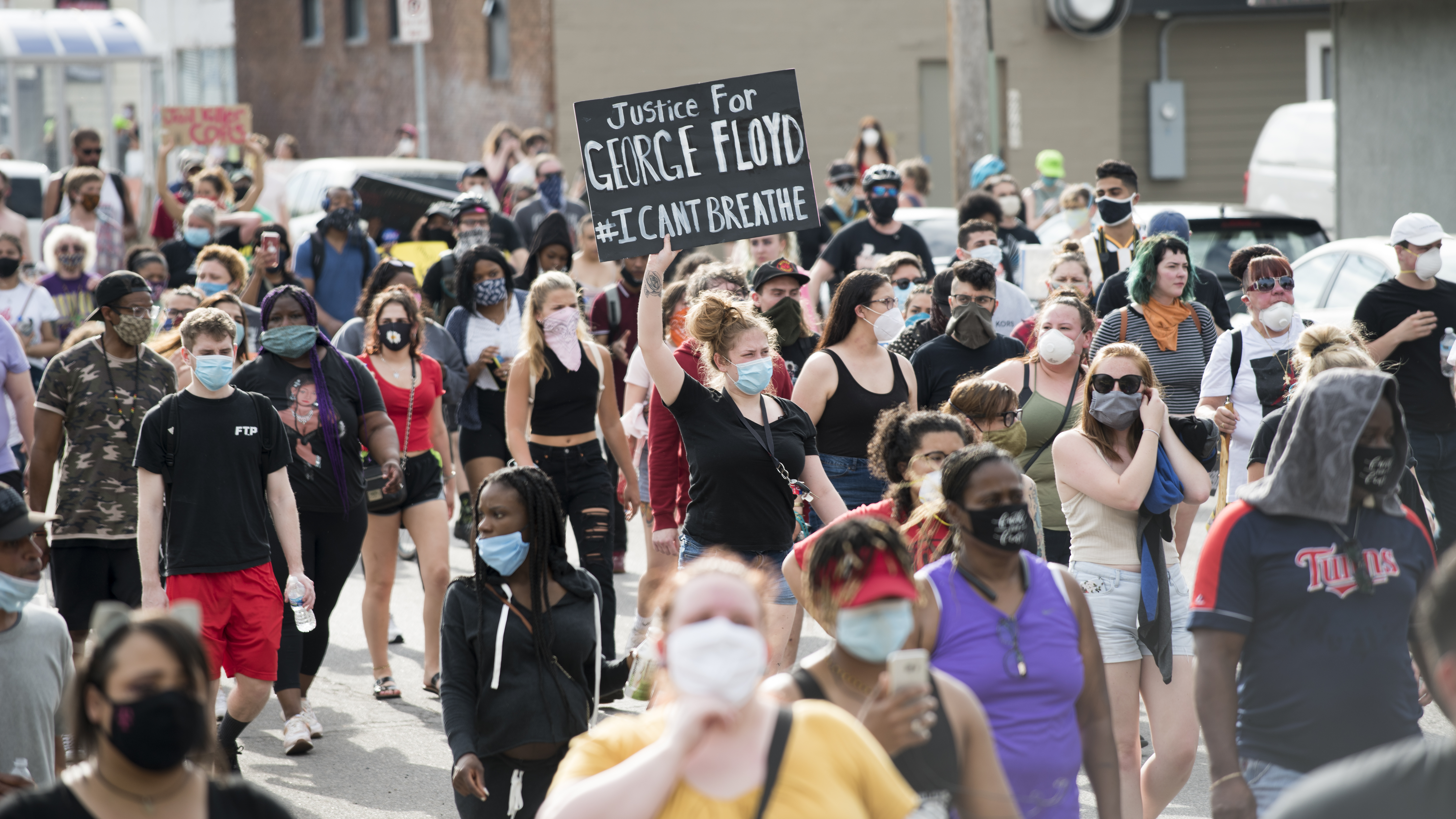
Protesters marching in Minneapolis on May 26, 2020, the day after Floyd's murder. A protester's sign reads, "Justice for George Floyd" and "#I CANT BREATHE".

Protests began in Minneapolis on May 26, the day after the murder of George Floyd, when a video of the incident had circulated widely in the media. By midday, people had gathered by the thousands at the location of Floyd's murder and created a makeshift memorial. Organizers of the rally emphasized keeping the protest peaceful. Protesters and Floyd's family demanded that all four officers at the scene of his arrest and death be charged with murder and that judicial consequences be swift. That evening, the protest rally turned into a march to the Minneapolis Police Department's third precinct station, where the officers were believed to work. After the main protest group disbanded, a small skirmish the night of May 26 resulted in minor property damage at the station and the police firing tear gas at demonstrators.

Protests were held at several locations in the Minneapolis–Saint Paul metropolitan area in subsequent days. The situation escalated on the nights of May 27 to 29, when widespread arson, rioting, and looting took place, in contrast to daytime protests that were characterized as mostly peaceful. Some initial acts of property destruction on May 27 by a 32-year-old man with ties to white supremacist organizations, who local police investigators said was deliberately inciting racial tension, led to a chain reaction of fires and looting. The unrest, including demonstrators overtaking the Minneapolis third precinct police station and setting it on fire the night of May 28, garnered significant national and international media attention. After state officials mobilized Minnesota National Guard troops in its largest deployment since World War II, the violent unrest subsided and mostly peaceful protests resumed.

Violence and property destruction in May 2020 resulted in two deaths, 617 arrests, and more than $500 million in property damage to 1,500 locations, making it the second-most destructive period of local unrest in U.S. history, after the 1992 Los Angeles riots.

=== George Floyd Square occupation protest, May 26, 2020 – 2003 or 2024 ===
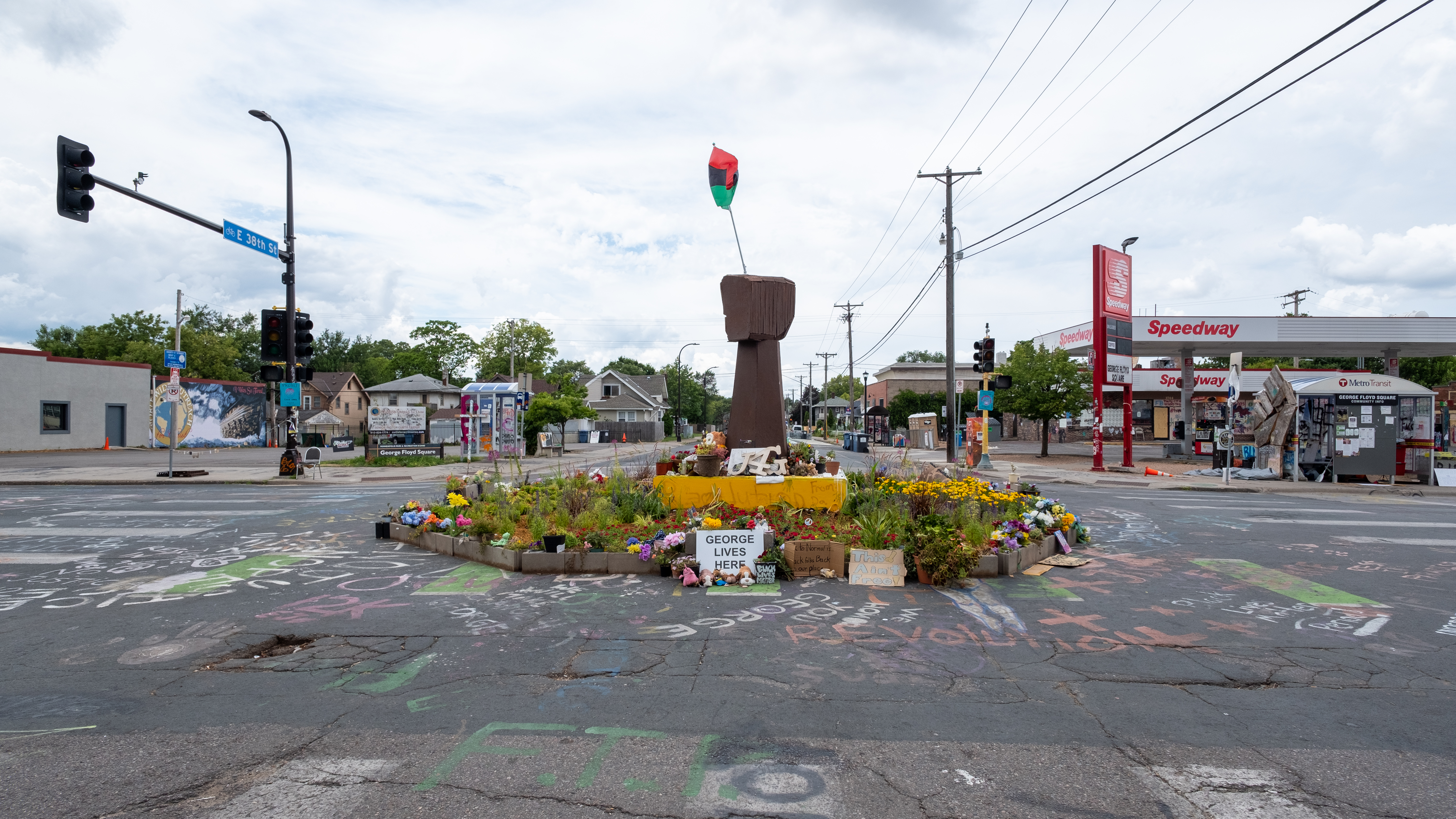
George Floyd Square, August 2020

On May 26, the day after George Floyd's murder, an occupation protest emerged at the intersection of East 38th Street and Chicago Avenue in Minneapolis, where Floyd was murdered. Protesters turned the area into a makeshift memorial and erected barricades to keep automobile traffic out, and police officers largely avoided the area in the following months. Thousands of visitors protested and grieved at the site, which was adorned with public art installments and described as like a "shrine". When Minneapolis city officials attempted to negotiate reopening the intersection in August 2020, protesters demanded that the city meet a list of 24 demands before removing cement barricades around it.

The Minneapolis Planning Commission recommended to the city council that Chicago Avenue between 37th and 39th streets be named "George Perry Floyd Jr Place", and the city designated the intersection as one of seven cultural districts in the city. The city also allocated $4.7 million to establish a permanent memorial at the site, though by the end of 2020, it was unable to reach agreement with community organizations that had presented officials with a list of demands before opening the intersection back up. The occupation protests persisted in 2021. City crews removed cement barricades at the intersection on June 3, 2021, as part of a phased reopening process, and vehicular traffic resumed on June 20, after having been closed for over a year.

Despite the intersection reopening to vehicular traffic, by the end of 2021 the occupied protest at George Floyd Square had persisted for 19 months. Tension persisted between organizers of the occupied protest, neighborhood residents, and city officials into 2023. As of May 25, 2024, four years after Floyd's murder, the area remained a gathering place for protest.

=== Michael Freeman protests, May 27–late 2020 ===
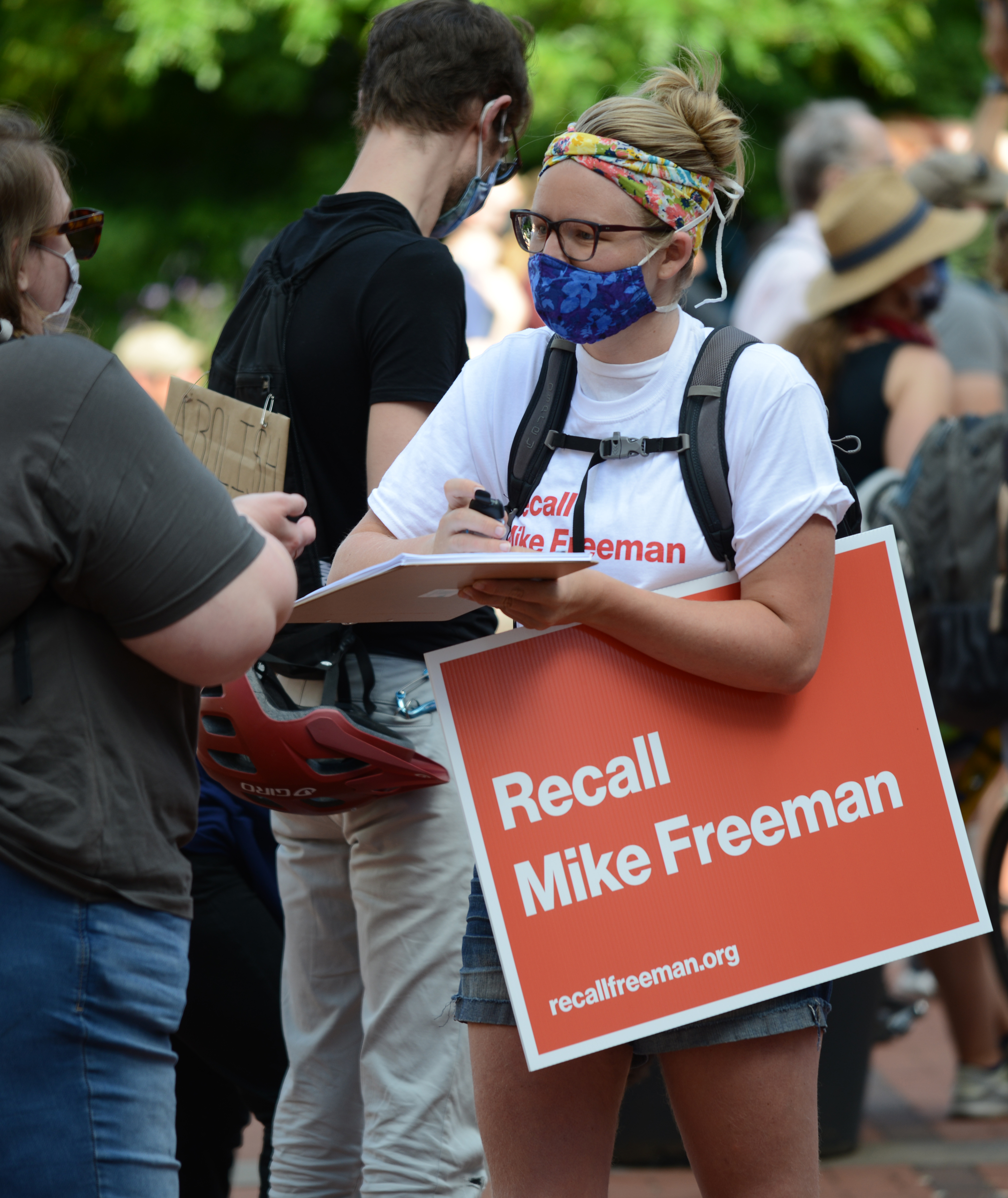
A volunteer campaigns to recall Michael O. Freeman, June 11, 2020.

In the aftermath of Floyd's murder, protests were held regarding Hennepin County Attorney Michael Freeman, with several taking place outside his Minneapolis home, beginning on May 27, 2020. Freeman was the attorney for Hennepin County and the initial prosecutor of the four Minneapolis police officers involved in Floyd's murder. Protesters were outraged by comments Freeman made on May 28, 2020, when he said, "There is other evidence that does not support a criminal charge", referencing how officials were reviewing evidence about whether to charge the police officers with crimes. Freeman later said the remarks were misinterpreted and were meant to convey a thorough review of all available evidence.

The Hennepin County Sheriff's Office deployed deputies and the county paid for private security to protect Freeman and his home against alleged threats. On May 30, more than 1,000 protesters gathered outside his home, and some caused minor damage to the house. A protest group gathered at the Hennepin County Government Center on June 12 to demand Freeman's resignation over his handling of previous officer-involved shootings in Minneapolis, such as the shooting of Jamar Clark and the prosecution of former police officer Mohamed Noor in the shooting of Justine Damond. A group also launched a petition drive to recall Freeman.

Freeman later sold his house in late 2020 at less than the assessed value. Some protesters viewed Freeman's home move as a success of their efforts to pressure him politically.

=== Police abolition movement, June 6, 2020–November 2, 2021 ===
A "defund police" rally at Powderhorn Park, June 7, 2020

Protesters of Floyd's murder in Minneapolis and elsewhere began calling for reforms of police forces, including defunding, downsizing, or abolishing traditional police departments. Led by local organization Black Visions Collective, thousands of protesters marched in Minneapolis on June 6, 2020. The march ended at the home of Mayor Jacob Frey. The crowd demanded that he come outside and asked if he supported abolishing the city's police force. When Frey responded that he did not, the crowd ordered him to leave and booed him away.

On June 7, 2020, at a Powderhorn Park rally organized by Black Visions Collective and several other black-led social justice organizations, nine of the 13 members of the Minneapolis City Council vowed before a large crowd to dismantle the city's police department. Activists who organized the rally wanted to replace the police department with unarmed public safety responders, but details about the proposal were indefinite.

The effort to replace the Minneapolis police department with a public safety department continued in 2020 and 2021. A ballot measure was put before Minneapolis voters in the municipal election on November 2, 2021. If passed, city officials would have 30 days to establish a Department of Public Safety, though the exact structure of the new department, the services it would provide, the number of police officers it employed, and its funding level would be determined through a series of city ordinances. Voters rejected the ballot measure, which required at least 51% to pass, with 80,506 votes (56.2%) cast for "no" and 62,813 (43.8%) for "yes".

=== Christopher Columbus statue toppling, June 10 ===
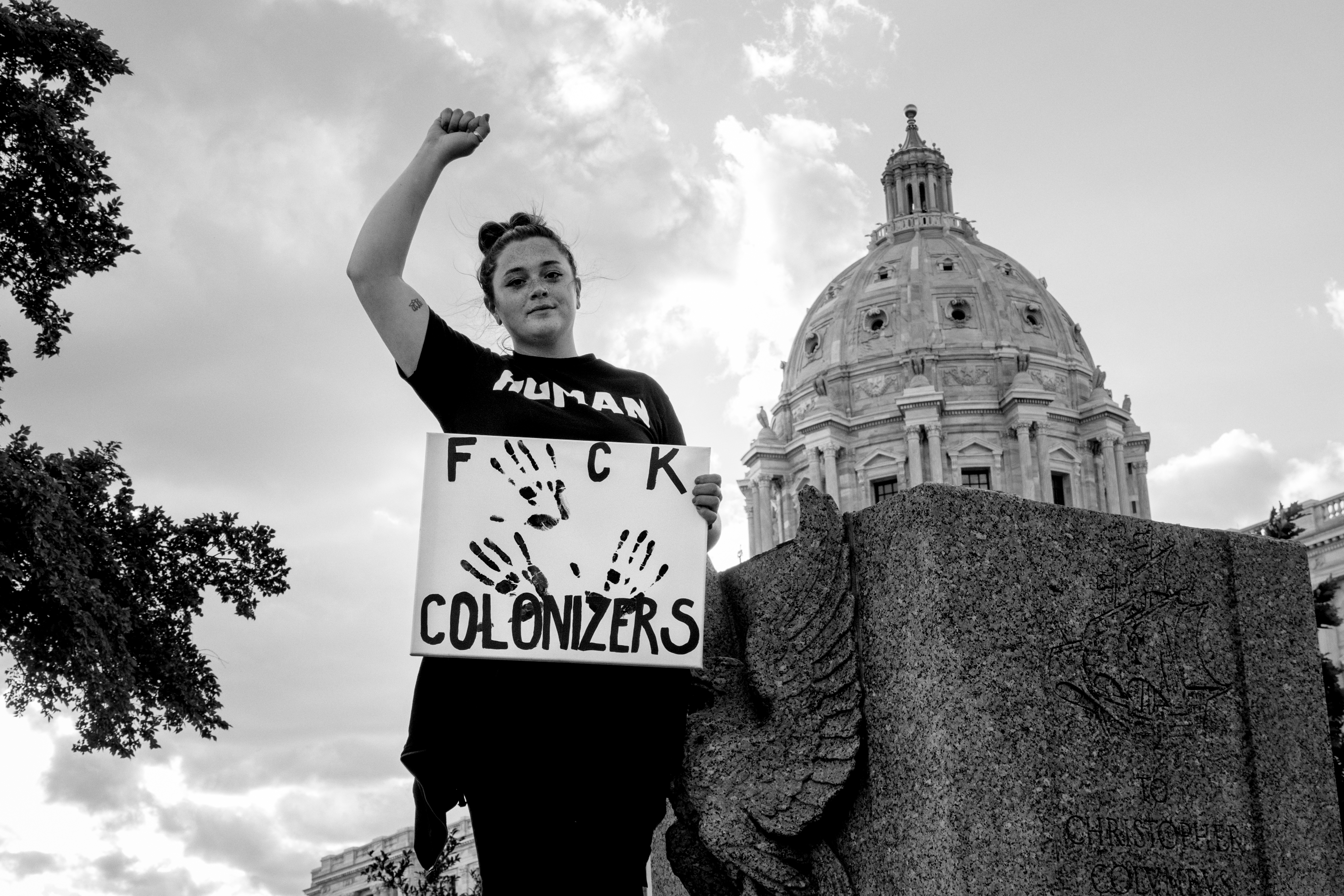
A demonstrator raises a fist next to the empty pedestal, June 10, 2020.

An American Indian Movement group tore down a statue of Christopher Columbus outside the state capitol building in Saint Paul on June 10 as the global protest movement turned toward removing monuments and memorials with controversial legacies.

Earlier in the day, members of the American Indian Movement, led by Mike Forcia of the Bad River Band of the Lake Superior Tribe of Chippewa Indians, announced their intention to topple the statue. State Patrol troopers and a Department of Public Safety tribal liaison met with organizers before the event, encouraging them to follow a legal process for removal and warning them that they could face charges for destruction of public property. Forcia countered that they had already waited far too long, having worked through official channels for years without success. American Indian Movement members and other demonstrators, including Dakota and Ojibwe community members, looped a rope around the statue and pulled it off its granite pedestal. The group drummed, sang songs, and took photos with the fallen statue. No one was arrested at the event. State Patrol troopers watched from a distance and did not intervene. Troopers eventually formed a line to protect the statue before it was transported offsite.

In December, Forcia agreed to a plea deal and accepted 100 hours in community service in connection with the incident. Officials estimated the cost to repair the statue would be over $154,000.

=== Minneapolis police union protests, June 12 ===
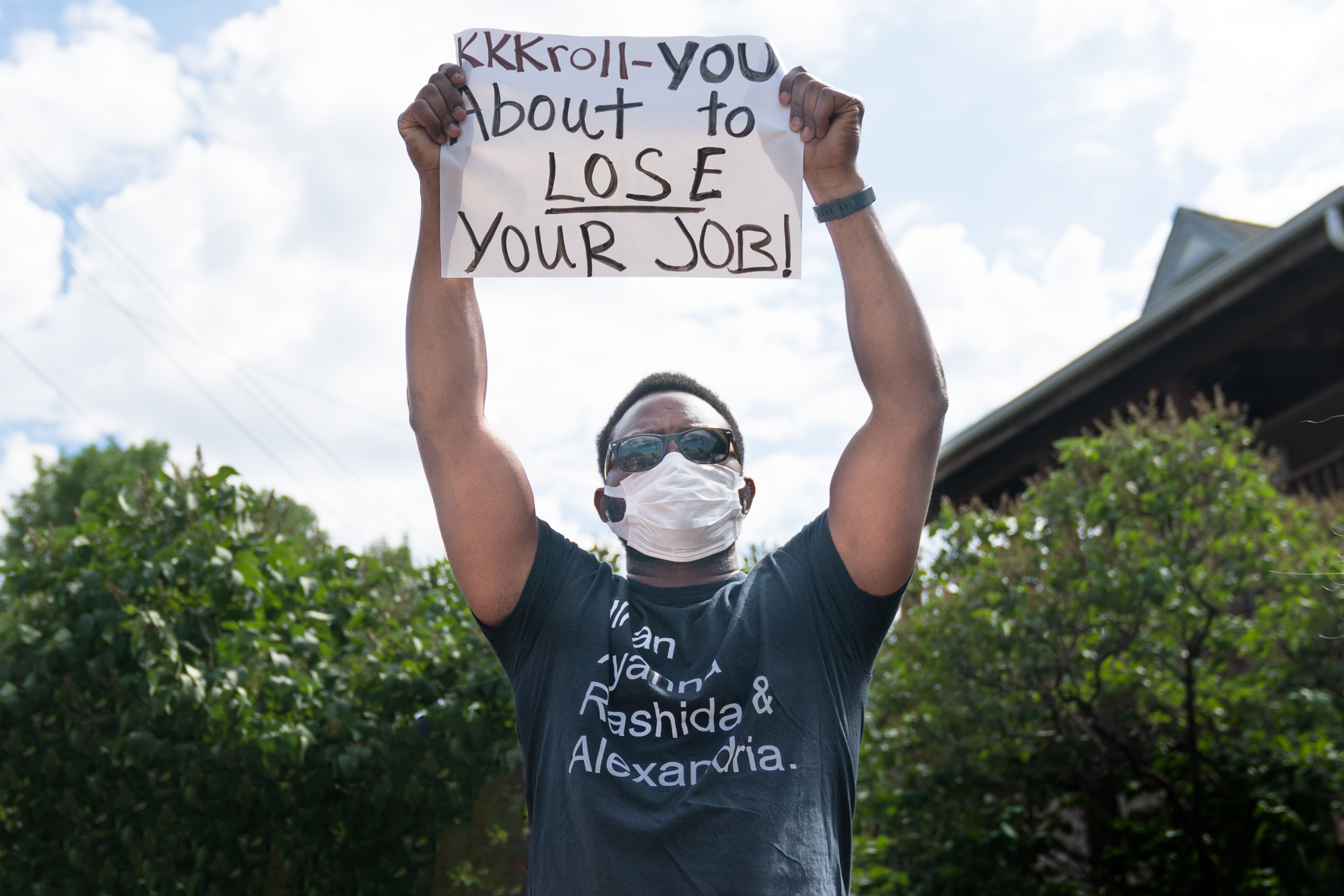
A protester holds a sign at the Minneapolis police federation on June 12, 2020.

The Police Officers Federation of Minneapolis, the union representing Minneapolis Police Department officers, and its elected leader were the subject of several protest events. Protesters gathered at the Police Officers Federation building in Minneapolis on June 12 to demand the resignation of Bob Kroll, head of the city's police union, who had characterized the protests and Black Lives Matter as a "terrorist organization". Thousands of people stretched in every direction from the federation building and listened to speeches by community leaders. Protesters returned on June 25. Kroll had earlier said he would not step down from the post. Protesters said they would continue protesting until their demands were met.

=== Juneteenth commemoration, June 19 ===
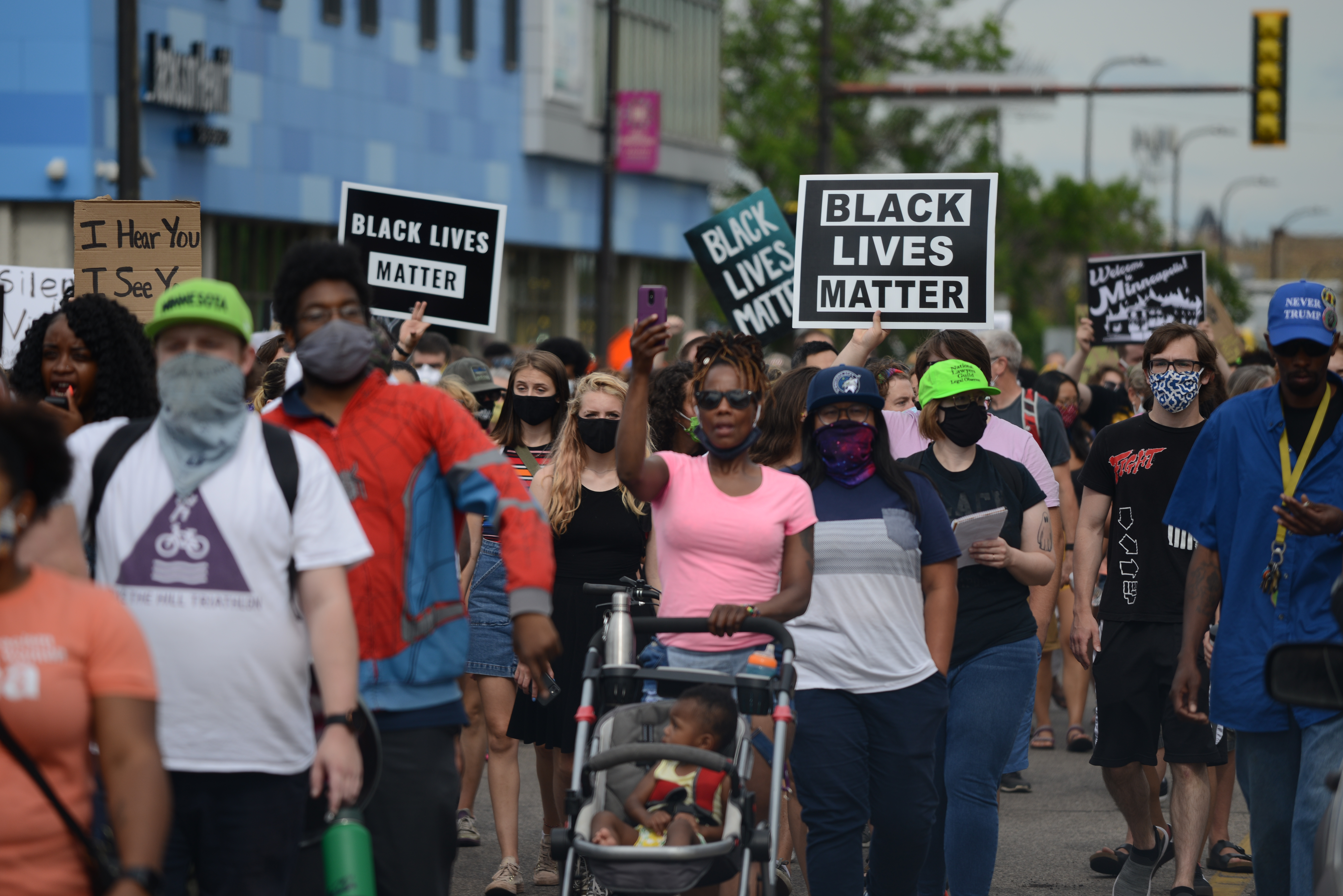
Juneteenth march in north Minneapolis, June 19, 2020

On June 19, dozens of Juneteenth commemorations were held in the Twin Cities metropolitan area, including in Minneapolis near the former third precinct station and at the location of Floyd's murder. Participants at the events connected recent instances of police brutality to the historic legacy of slavery in the United States. The Minnesota Black Lives Matter chapter that rallied at the state capitol building called on state lawmakers who were meeting in a special legislative session to agree on police reform measures. Walz issued a proclamation declaring eight minutes 46 seconds of silence at 11:00 a.m. CDT on June 9, 2020, in memory of Floyd, which coincided with the beginning of Floyd's funeral in Houston, Texas. He also proclaimed June 19 "Juneteenth Freedom Day" and called on the legislature to make it an annual state holiday.

=== Calvin Griffith statue removal, June 19 ===
The Minnesota Twins removed the statue of former owner Calvin Griffith outside the team's Target Field baseball stadium in Minneapolis on June 19. In a statement, the team said the "statue reflects an ignorance on our part of systemic racism present in 1978, 2010 and today". Griffith's legacy was tarnished after racist comments he made in a 1978 speech at the Waseca Lions Club, but a statue of him was placed in the stadium's plaza when it opened in 2010.

=== State capitol protest, June 24 ===
In June, George Floyd protests in Minneapolis–Saint Paul broadened to issues of historic racism and police brutality, with events nearly every day. Protesters gathered outside the governor's mansion in Saint Paul on June 24 and called on him to reconvene the legislature in a special session to pass police reform measures. Lawmakers had recently adjourned a special session without agreeing to legislation on the topic.

=== Breonna Taylor protests, June 26 ===
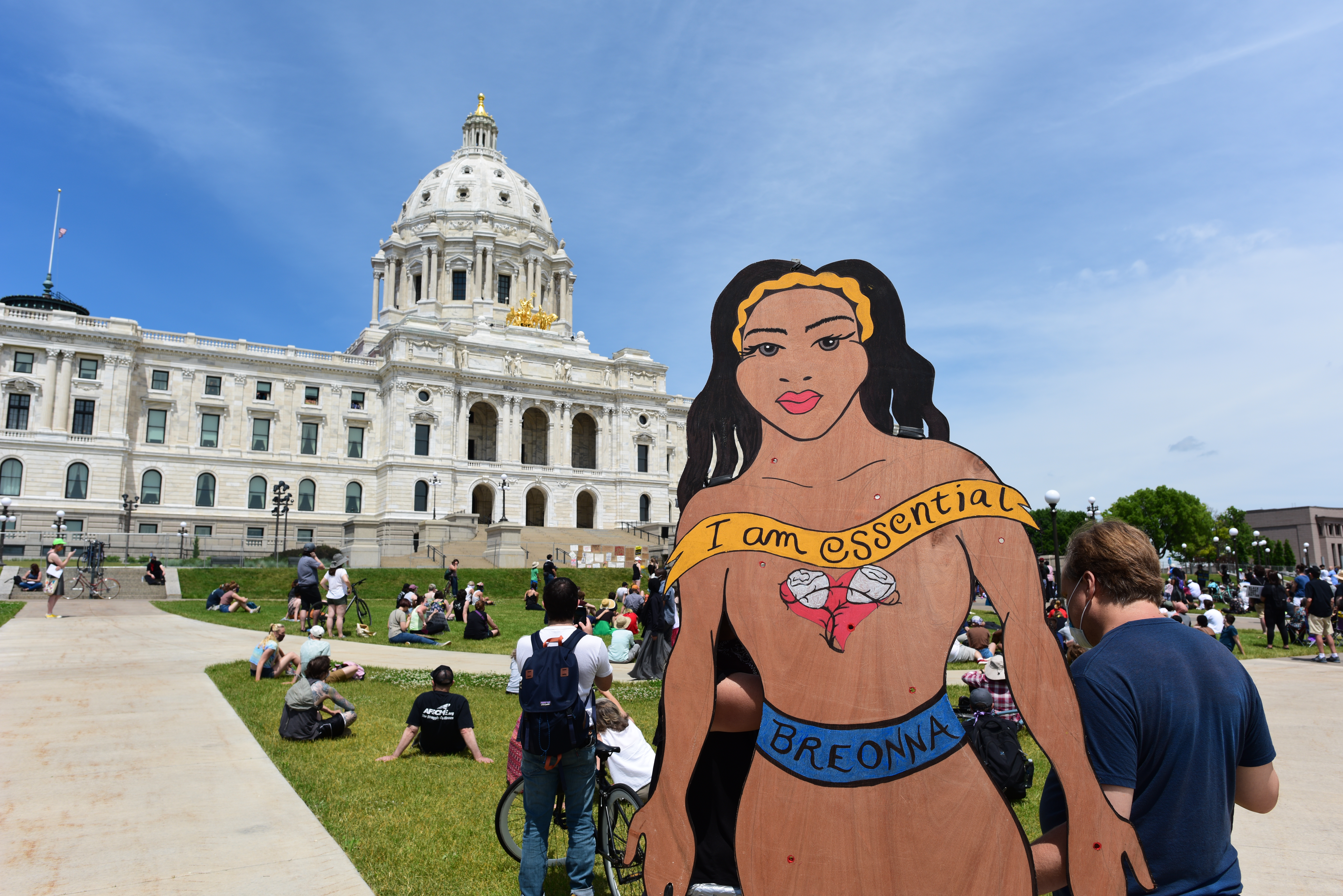
A Breonna Taylor cardboard cutout at a rally at the state capitol building in Saint Paul, June 2020

Protesters seeking justice for Breonna Taylor held a "Red Sunday" march on June 26 and gathered at several Twin Cities locations.

=== Pride parade protests, June 28 ===
Despite the cancellation of the official Twin Cities Pride event, on June 28 protesters gathered in downtown Minneapolis and called for justice for Floyd, greater protections for black transgender people, community control of policing, and the freeing of "political prisoners". Restrictions on public gatherings due to the COVID-19 pandemic prevented organizers from holding a more celebratory event of LGBTQ+ people as in past years, which had been among the most well-attended Pride parade events in the country. The 2020 Pride parade in the Twin Cities intersected with the Black Lives Matter movement and returned to the way it began, as a protest movement.

=== Hachalu Hundessa protests, June 30 ===
On June 30, several hundred protesters from Minnesota's Oromo diaspora gathered outside the Minnesota state capitol building to protest the killing of Hachalu Hundessa, a popular musician and political activist who was shot and killed in Addis Ababa on June 28, resulting in considerable unrest in Ethiopia. On the evening of July 1, hundreds of protesters blocked Interstate 94 in Minneapolis to call for justice for Hundessa and the Oromo people.

=== "Black 4th" rallies, July 4 ===
Thousands took part in several peaceful demonstrations in Minneapolis and called for racial equity and justice for Floyd on July 4. Organizers of two marches, dubbed "Black 4th", through predominately white areas of the city sought to continue the momentum for police reform and raise awareness about social justice issues.

=== Philando Castile commemoration, July 6 ===
Four years after the shooting of Philando Castile by a police officer in the Twin Cities suburb of St. Anthony, several Black Lives Matter rallies were held on July 6 to commemorate Castile and connect his killing to the global protest movement about racism and police brutality sparked by Floyd's murder.

=== Calvin Horton Jr. protests, July 21 ===
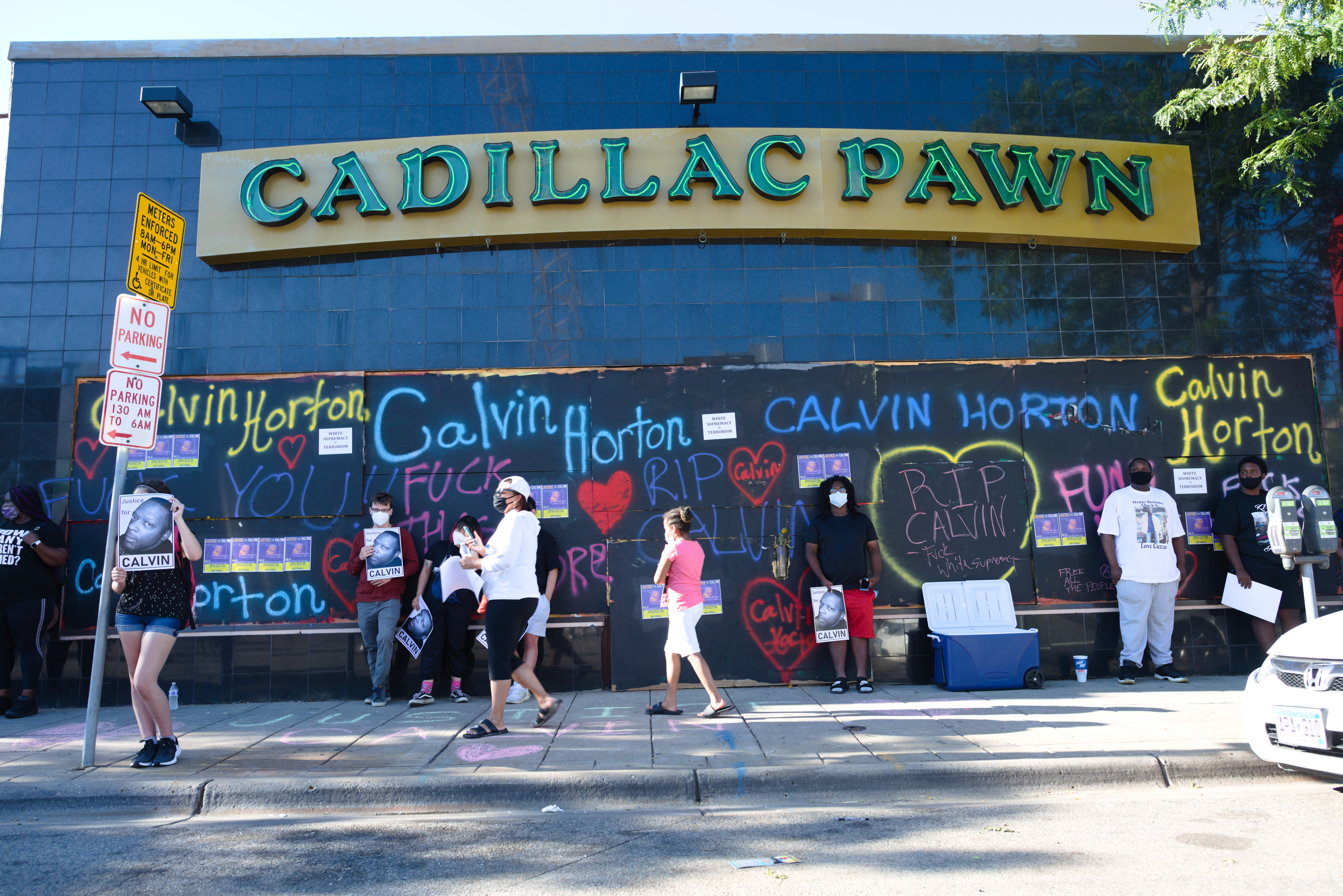
Protesters at the boarded-up Cadillac Pawn shop in Minneapolis, July 21, 2020

On May 27, during unrest over Floyd's murder in Minneapolis, Calvin Horton Jr., a 43-year-old man from Minneapolis, was fatally shot by the owner of the Cadillac Pawn & Jewelry shop, who believed Horton was burglarizing his business. The incident took place on East Lake Street, about one mile (1.6 km) from the main protest sites. The shop owner was arrested the night of the shooting and held in Hennepin County Jail for several days, but was released pending further investigation. There were no new developments in the case by July 21, 2020, when family and supporters of Horton protested outside the store and demanded the owner be charged with murder.

In December 2020, Hennepin County Attorney Mike Freeman's office declined to file charges against the pawn shop owner after a six-month investigation due to lack of evidence that the shooting was not self-defense.

=== Powderhorn Park encampment closure, August 14 ===
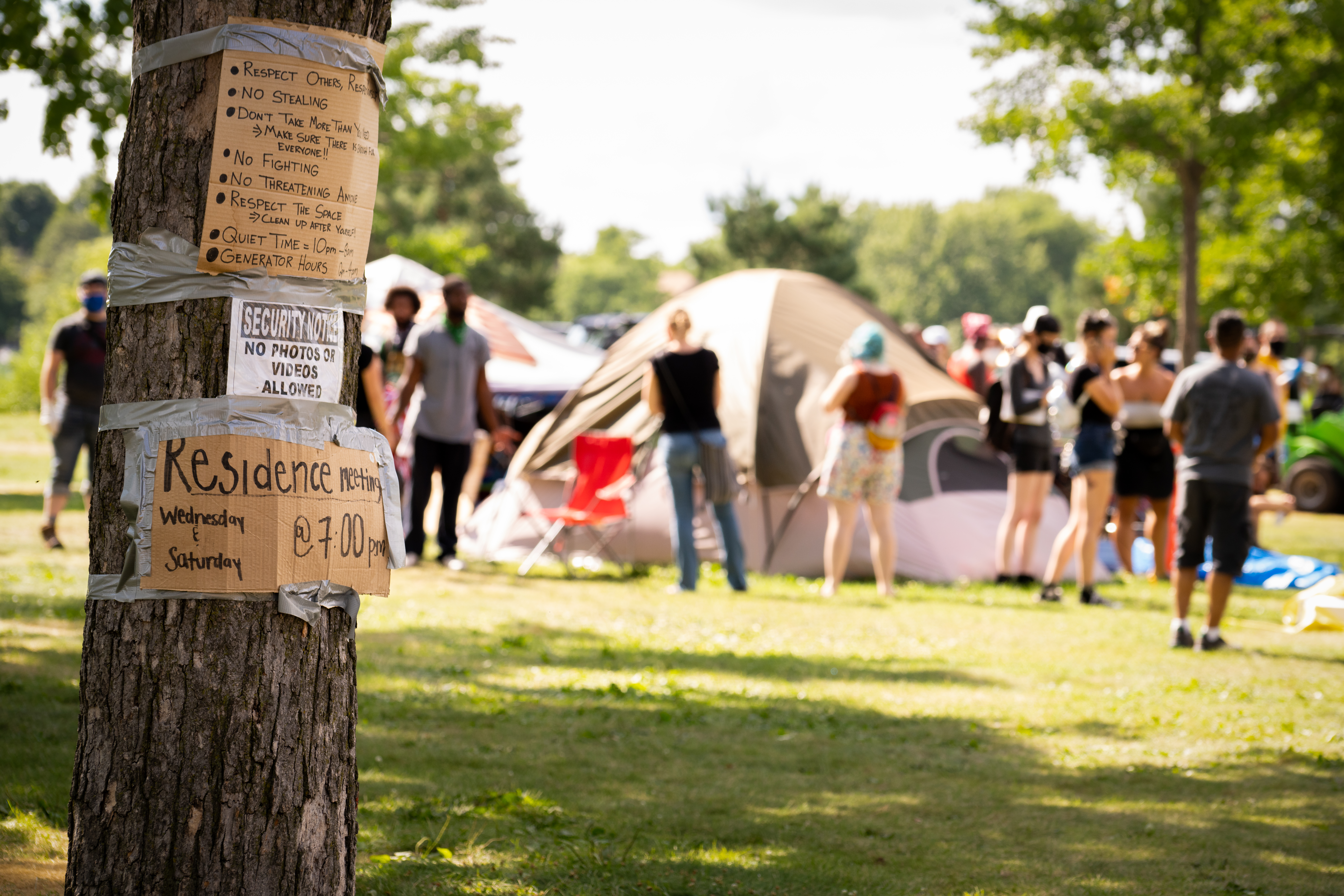
Encampment in Powderhorn Park, July 20, 2020

A sprawling encampment at Powderhorn Park generated controversy as it grew to 560 tents by mid-July. Numerous sexual assaults, fights, and drug use at the encampment generated alarm for nearby residents. The city had pushed to connect people experiencing homeless with services, including establishing three new shelters, and shelter beds remained available. Officials adopted a deescalation for disbanding camps due to the ongoing civil unrest, and when they attempted to remove tents at non-permitted sites, they faced opposition from a sanctuary movement and protest groups. After violence and multiple sexual assaults at Powderhorn Park, the park board cleared it of tents on August 14, 2020, as police faced off with protesters and fired pepper spray.

=== Sympathy protest for Portland, Oregon, July 23 ===
On July 23, Minnesotans gathered at a federal courthouse and marched through downtown Minneapolis in opposition to the deployment of federal troops to protests in Portland, Oregon.

=== Bob Kroll residential protest, August 15 ===
Anti-Bob Kroll graffiti in Minneapolis, June 13, 2020

On August 15, a 100-person protest group led by Nekima Levy Armstrong's Racial Justice Network gathered outside Kroll's home in Hugo, Minnesota, to call for his resignation from the Minneapolis police union. Protesters also criticized Kroll's partner, WCCO television reporter Liz Collin, for a conflict of interest in stories about police violence. Remarks by John Thompson, a Minnesota Democratic-Farmer-Labor candidate for the state legislature from St. Paul, drew controversy. Thompson said in his speech, "You think we give a fuck about burning Hugo down?" and "Fuck Hugo."

Some of Thompson's remarks were said to be directed at children who were present. The event also featured the bashing of piñata effigies of Kroll and Collin. Several local media members condemned the symbolic display of violence against a woman journalist. Inflammatory rhetoric at the event was also condemned by leaders of the Minnesota Democratic-Farmer-Labor and Republican parties, and led to an apology from Thompson.

=== Police station vandalized, August 15 ===
Late at night on August 15, a group of approximately 50 people marched to Minneapolis's fifth precinct police station in what was initially described as a peaceful protest, but it became violent when people threw rocks at windows, threw paint on the building, and shot commercial-grade fireworks at police officers before fleeing the scene. Mayor Frey and Minneapolis City Council Vice President Andrea Jenkins said the destruction was not the solution to problems with policing. In 2021, a man from Blaine, Minnesota pleaded guilty to federal criminal charges related to the unrest and other incidents.

=== Jacob Blake protests, August 24 ===
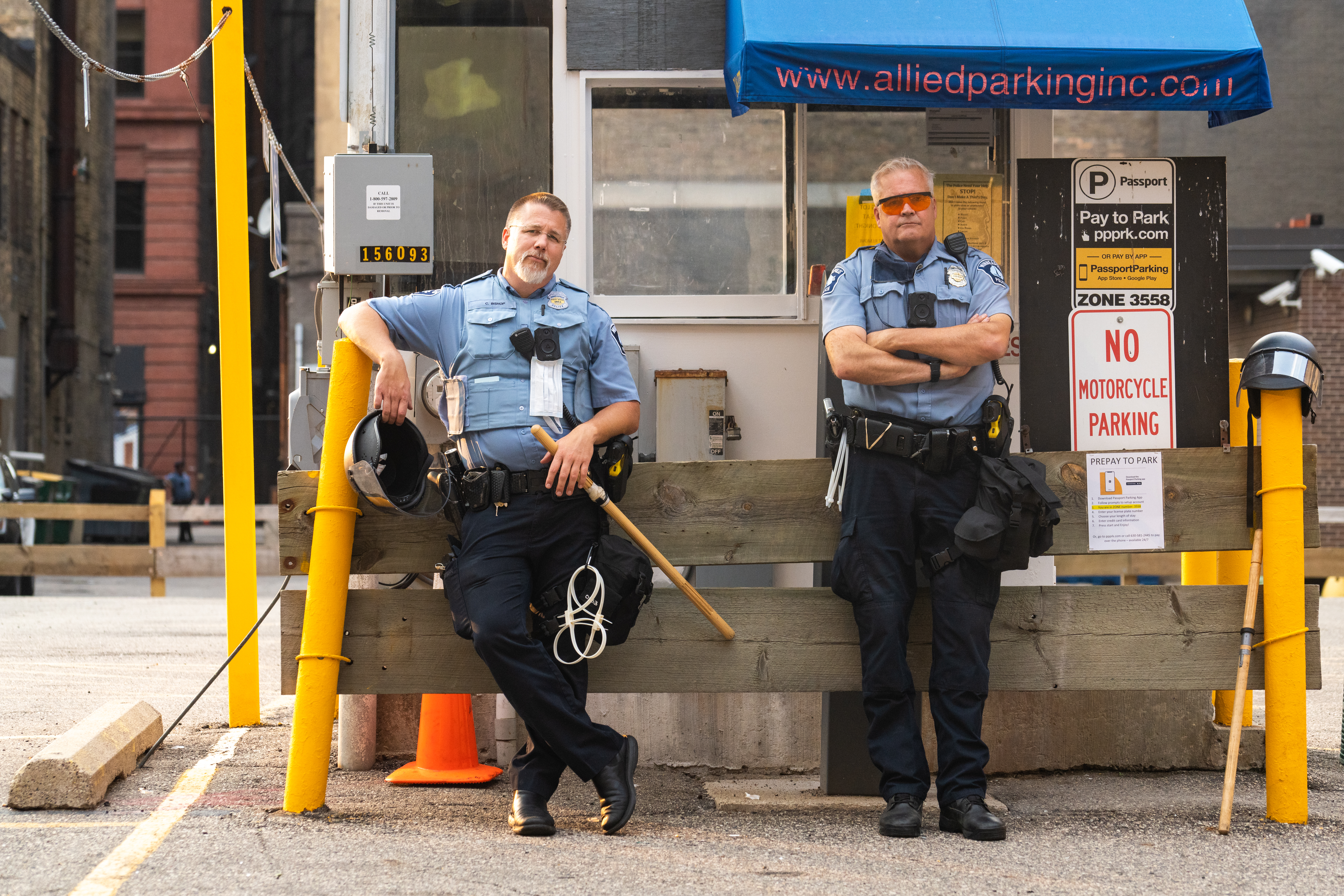
Minneapolis police officers with riot gear, August 24, 2020

On August 23, Jacob Blake, an African-American man, was shot four times in the back during an arrest by police officer Rusten Sheskey. The incident occurred in Kenosha, Wisconsin, as police officers were attempting to arrest Blake. In reaction to the incident, protests and unrest occurred in Wisconsin and elsewhere. On August 24 in Minneapolis, a 100-person protest over Blake's shooting took place in the city's downtown area, and after the main protest group disbanded, some protesters became violent and broke windows and threatened to breach a jail facility, resulting in 11 arrests. One Minneapolis police officer suffered a broken hand during a confrontation with a demonstrator.

=== Riots over false rumors of a police shooting, August 26–28 ===
Hennepin County sheriff officers on patrol after looting and vandalism, August 27, 2020

Rioting and looting in downtown Minneapolis came as reaction to false rumors that Eddie Sole Jr., a 38-year-old African-American man, had been shot and killed by Minneapolis police officers on August 26. Surveillance video showed that Sole had died by suicide, a self-inflicted gunshot to the head, during a manhunt for a homicide suspect in which he was the person of interest as police officers closed in to arrest him after a foot chase. Controversially, the police released the CCTV camera footage of the suicide in attempts to stop the unrest.

Overnight destruction the night of August 26 led to at least 132 arrests for violence and looting, as damage to 77 properties occurred in the Minneapolis–Saint Paul metropolitan region, including five buildings that were set on fire, including the Target Corporation headquarters building. Governor Walz declared a state of emergency and deployed National Guard troops, and Mayor Frey imposed on overnight curfew. Nearly 1,000 members of law enforcement and 400 Minnesota National Guard troops amassed in the metro area to prevent more lawlessness, and calm prevailed after August 27.

=== Wall of Forgotten Natives, September 3 ===
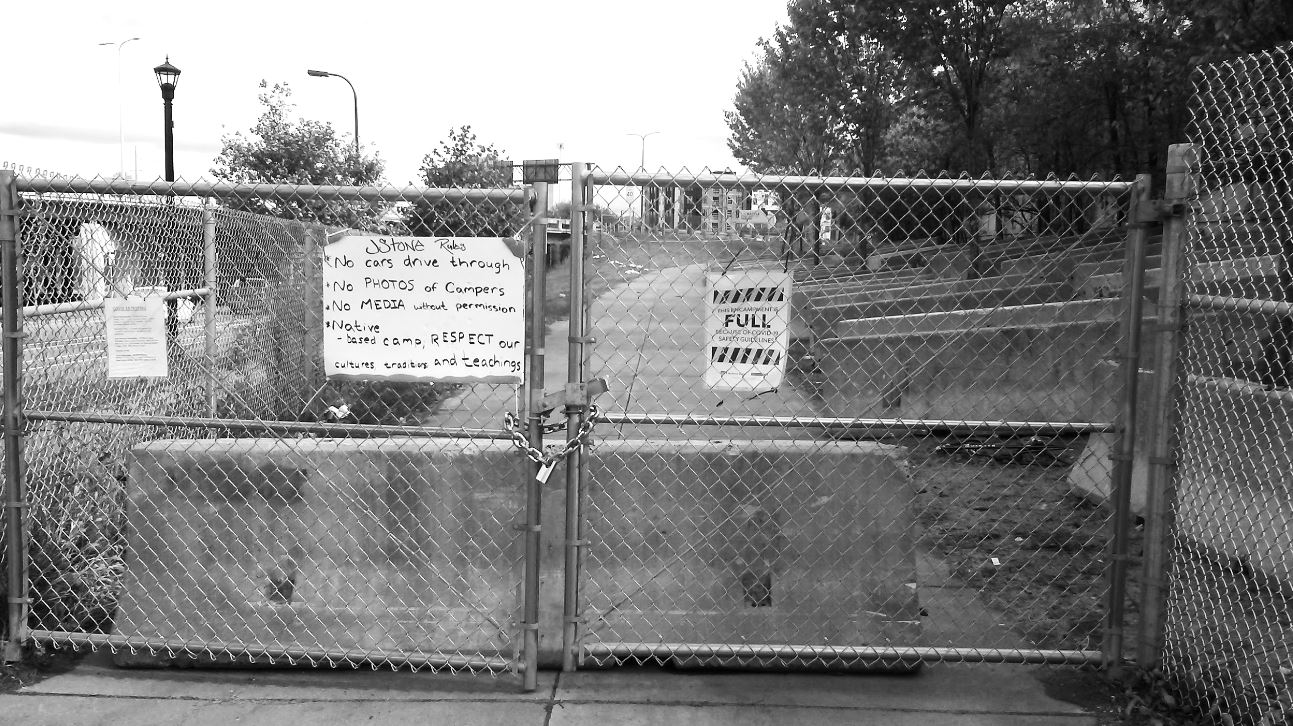
Franklin-Hiawatha encampment north gate, October 1, 2020

Two years after a large camp was disbanded near Hiawatha and Franklin avenues in Minneapolis, on September 3 a group backed by protesters and American Indian Movement advocates reoccupied a site they called the Wall of Forgotten Natives. The state had barricaded the site in 2018 when an encampment closed after experiencing drug overdoses, spread of disease, violence, fires, and deaths. In September 2020, reoccupation of the encampment with 40 tents came after the city closed another encampment on 13th Avenue due to health and safety concerns and after officials sought help from nonprofit organizations. Reestablishment of the Hiawatha encampment also came during a time of increasing confrontation between Minneapolis officials and homeless advocates, as the city had hoped to close all encampments by October.

=== Pretrial hearing for Chauvin, Lane, and Keung, and Thao protests, September 11 ===
Hundreds rallied outside the Hennepin County Government Center, a downtown Minneapolis local government and court building, on September 11 during a pretrial hearing for the four police officers at the scene of Floyd's murder—former officers Chauvin, Lane, and Keung, and Thao. Confrontations between some in the crowd and the officers' attorney were described as "angry". On November 5, defense attorneys cited the exchange on September 11 and safety concerns in their arguments in court to have a change of venue to another jurisdiction for the trial, but Peter Cahill, the presiding judge, rejected their motion.

=== Blocking the third precinct police station, September 16 ===
After the third precinct station burned down during the May riots, police officers worked out of the convention center in downtown Minneapolis. In August, officials pursued a lease agreement for a temporary police station at a privately owned building on Minnehaha Avenue in the Seward neighborhood. A neighborhood group that supported the police abolition movement pushed back against the city and organized a "Blocked the Precinct Block party" protest rally near the site. The city's lease agreement fell apart in September after opposition from community groups and threats of violence against the property owner and police officers. Police investigated threats to burn the property down and the building was tagged with anti-police graffiti, including a call for "the literal deaths of individual police officers".

=== Brooklyn Center arson fraud, September 23 ===
Denis Molla, a 30-year-old man from Brooklyn Center, Minnesota, gained widespread media attention after he alleged that in the early morning hours of September 23, 2020, his detached garage and camper were vandalized with graffiti and set on fire by supporters of Black Lives Matter and Democratic presidential nominee Joe Biden. In media interviews about the incident, he speculated that he was the victim of a politically motivated attack as retaliation for displaying a flag in support of Donald Trump's presidential campaign. Molla submitted $300,000 in insurance claims for property damage, which his insurer mostly denied.

After the Brooklyn Center Police Department and the FBI investigated the incident and the insurance claims, Molla was charged in U.S. District Court in July 2022 with two counts of wire fraud, as prosecutors said in charging documents that he set his own property on fire and painted the graffiti messages himself. In October 2022, Molla pleaded guilty to federal wire fraud charges for receiving $61,000 in insurance claims and $17,000 from donors via GoFundMe. He was sentenced on June 8, 2023, to 2½ years in prison and one year of supervised release.

=== Derek Chauvin bail protests, October 7 ===
On October 7, protesters took to the streets and held rallies at several places in Minneapolis to express anger over the release on bail of Derek Chauvin, the former Minneapolis Police Department officer charged with murdering George Floyd. Chauvin was later fired from the department and arrested. He posted $1 million bail for his release pending trial. (The bail was later revoked on April 20, 2021, eight weeks before his sentencing, because Chauvin was found guilty.) Governor Walz sent 100 National Guardsmen, 100 state police troops, and 75 conservation officers to keep the peace. Law enforcement made 51 arrests late on October 7, of which 49 were for misdemeanor offenses such as unlawful assembly, one was for assault, and one was for an outstanding felony warrant.

=== Election night demonstration, November 3 ===
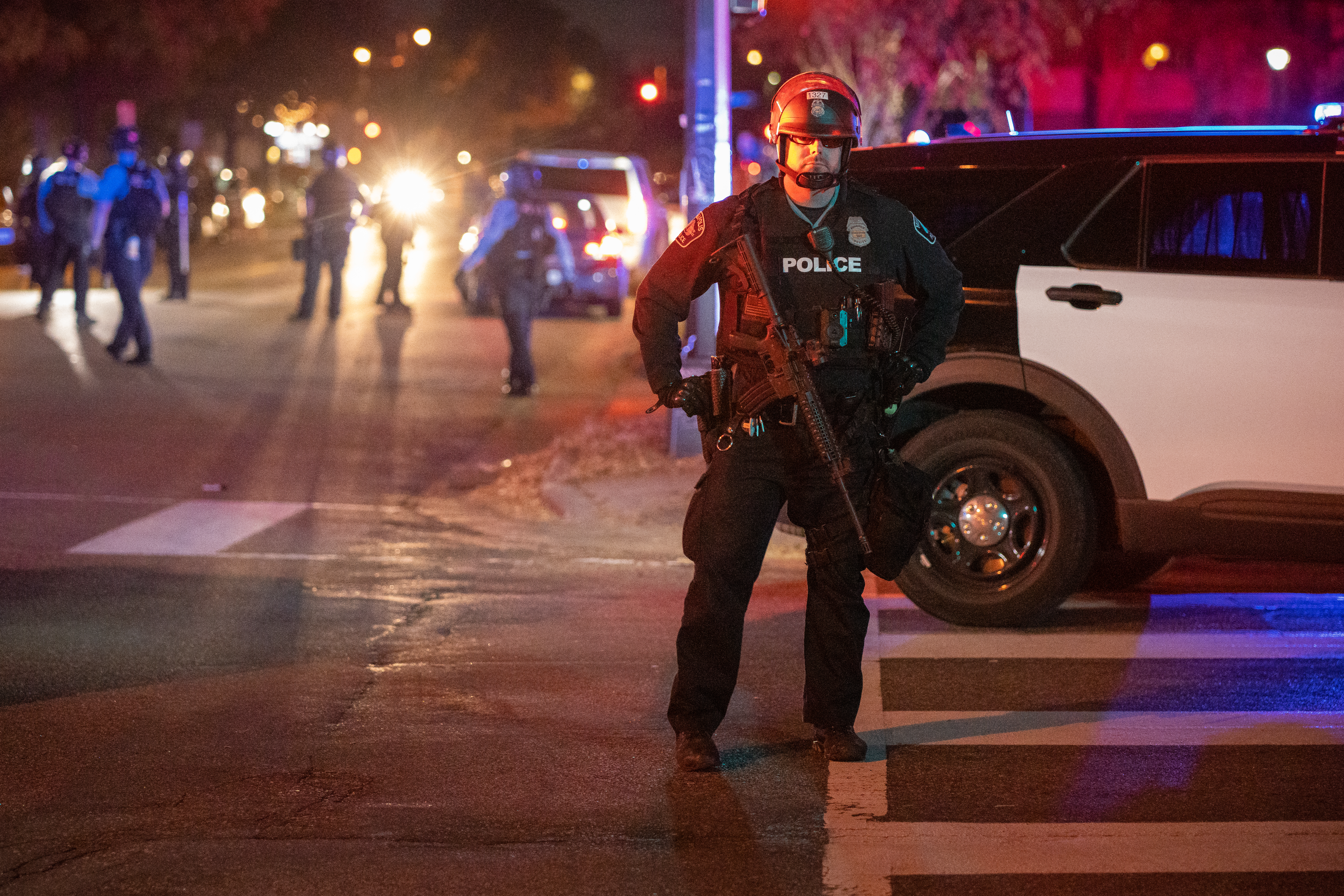
A police officer with a rifle during protests on November 3, 2020

Several business in Minneapolis and Saint Paul boarded up windows and doors on November 3 preparing for possible unrest related to the presidential election. Some of the businesses had suffered damages during protests following Floyd's murder and wanted to be prepared for the possibility of further unrest. The Minnesota National Guard was placed on standby and police forces in the two cities activated extra staff. A group of demonstrators marching behind an "America is Over" banner made their way through Uptown in Minneapolis late at night on Tuesday. Minneapolis police officers kept their distance as the group blocked several intersections, spray-painted storefronts, and threw traffic signs and debris into the street. When protesters shot fireworks at officers and refused to disperse, the police advanced and made 14 arrests for suspicion of rioting and fourth-degree assault. No injuries were reported.

=== Interstate 94 protest, November 4 ===
Protesters on Interstate 94 in Minneapolis on November 4, 2020

On November 4, as part of a national day of protest led by the National Alliance Against Racist and Political Repression after the U.S. presidential election, several local social justice organizations converged for protest marches through Minneapolis with the mantra "Don't Let Trump Steal the Election", a reference to President Donald Trump's false claims that the election was stolen and his attempts to overturn its results.

After marching through downtown, protesters entered onto Interstate 94, blocking vehicular traffic. As they attempted to exit the highway, Minneapolis police and Minnesota state patrol officers fired tear gas and then kettled and arrested 646 people for public nuisance and unlawful assembly, while continuing to block traffic for several hours. Most of those arrested were cited and released.

A 19-year-old woman from Golden Valley was charged with felony second-degree riot for pointing a laser in a police officer's eyes, and a 29-year-old woman from Minneapolis was charged with fourth-degree assault and obstructing the legal process for kicking a police officer. The charge against the 19-year-old, who tried to take a plea deal, was later dropped by the judge.

The mass arrest of 646 people was the largest in recent Minnesota history. In the aftermath, activists demanded that charges against demonstrators be dropped. The Minneapolis City Attorney's Office later pursued charges in 588 of the cases, saying that the demonstration was not protected by the First Amendment as it broke several laws and endangered motorists and pedestrians. Several hundred demonstrators accepted plea agreements to suspend prosecution in exchange for a $175 fine and six hours of community service. About 280 people rejected plea agreements. Among those who rejected a plea deal was Sara Jane Olson, a leftist radical in the late 1970s; she was convicted of a petty misdemeanor in 2021 and ordered to pay a $378 fine.

=== Thanksgiving Day statue vandalism, November 26 ===
In the early morning hours of November 26, a statute of George Washington at Washburn Fair Oaks Park in Minneapolis was toppled and defaced with anticolonial graffiti. A few miles away at BF Nelson Park, a monument depicting three generations of pioneers was spray painted with the words "no thanks", "no more genocide", "decolonize", and "land back". The Minneapolis Park and Recreation Board said it was investigating the incidents, but was aware of the controversy about the historic context of the statues. The vandalism came six months after a protest group toppled a Christopher Columbus statue outside the Minnesota state capitol building.

=== Reaction to the killing of Dolal Idd, December 30 ===
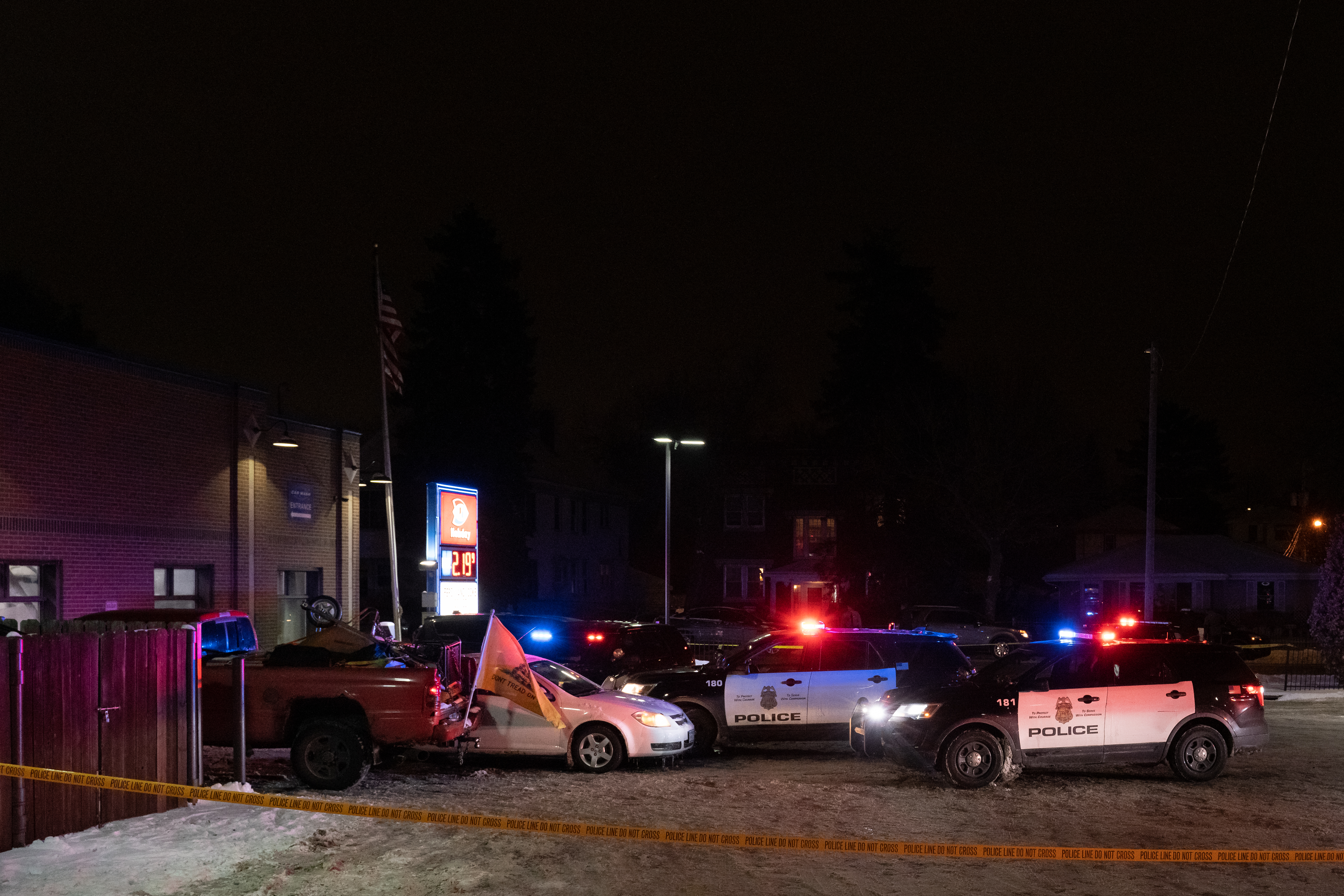
The secured crime scene in Minneapolis on December 30, 2020

Protests emerged the evening of December 30 after police shot and killed Dolal Idd at a Holiday gas station near the intersection of Cedar Avenue and East 36th Street in Minneapolis. The shooting happened at approximately 6:15 p.m., less than a one mile (1.6 km) from where George Floyd was murdered in May, and was the first fatal police shooting in the city since then. Few details were known about the shooting as approximately 100 protesters gathered at the scene. Some protesters shouted expletives and threw snowballs at police officers. Officers prepared to use pepper spray if assaulted by demonstrators. By late evening, the scene was calmer, as protesters blocked an intersection and built a bonfire. Several people attended a vigil on December 31 near the intersection of Cedar Avenue and East 36th Street for Idd and other victims of police violence.

=== New Year's Eve riot, December 31 ===
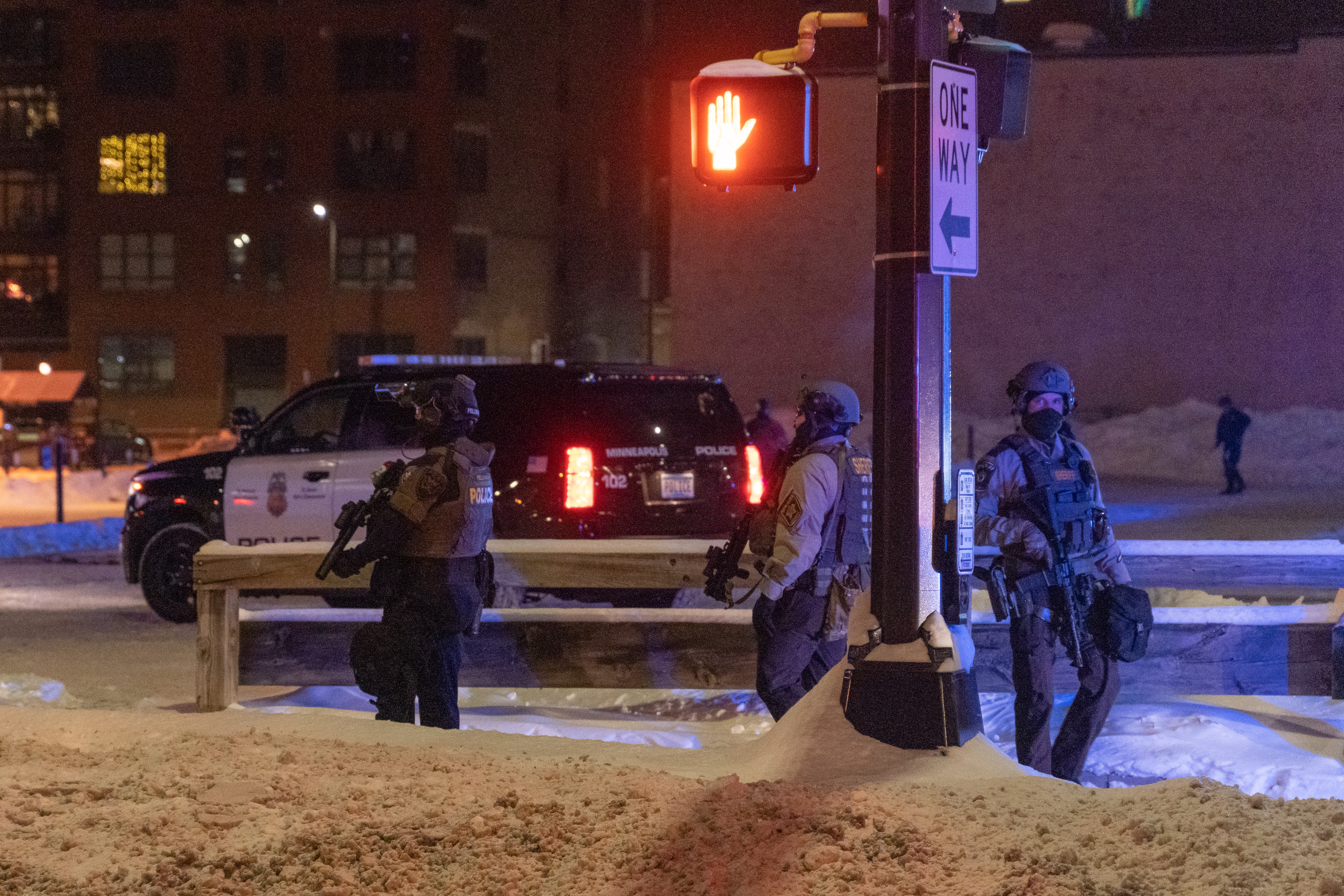
Minneapolis police officers on duty during protests in the early morning hours of January 1, 2021

Seventy-five demonstrators gathered in downtown Minneapolis on December 31 to protest police brutality. Police learned of the rally from a social media posting calling on people to wear black clothing and masks and to help "burn the precincts & the prisons [sic]". From the downtown area, demonstrators walked to Commons Park near U.S. Bank Stadium, where police observed the group shooting fireworks at motorists, painting graffiti on the walls of local government buildings, and disrupting traffic. That night, authorities gave orders for a crowd to disperse, but some people refused. At least 15 were detained for allegedly rioting and 21 were cited and released. Five were charged with felony riot and for being armed with a dangerous weapon.

The demonstration had been scheduled several weeks earlier and was unrelated to the killing of Dolal Idd.

== Events in 2021 ==
Arrangement is chronological by the beginning date of each notable event series; timelines for some topics overlap.

=== Dolal Idd protest march, January 3 ===
On January 3, 2021, as many as 1,000 protesters marched peacefully in south Minneapolis to express outrage over Dolal Idd's killing by Minneapolis police and a search of the Idd family home by the Hennepin County Sheriff's Office.

=== Downtown Minneapolis racial justice protest, January 9 ===
Several hundred people gathered in downtown Minneapolis on January 9, 2021, to protest racial injustice at a rally that featured speeches, hand-drawn signs, and chats. Protesters connected Idd's death on December 30, 2020, to Floyd and Jacob Blake. The week before the downtown Minneapolis gathering, a Wisconsin prosecutor declined to press charges against the police officer who shot Blake, which protesters at the rally objected to.

Protesters then marched from the Hennepin County Government Center to the Minneapolis Police Department's first precinct station for more speeches and chants. The protest group expressed outrage over the mob that stormed the United States Capitol building on January 6, 2021, and speakers contrasted the recent police-related homicides in Minneapolis to the mob of apparent white supremacists that overwhelmed Capitol police in Washington, D.C., who took little action to stop them.

=== Presidential inauguration protest, January 20 ===
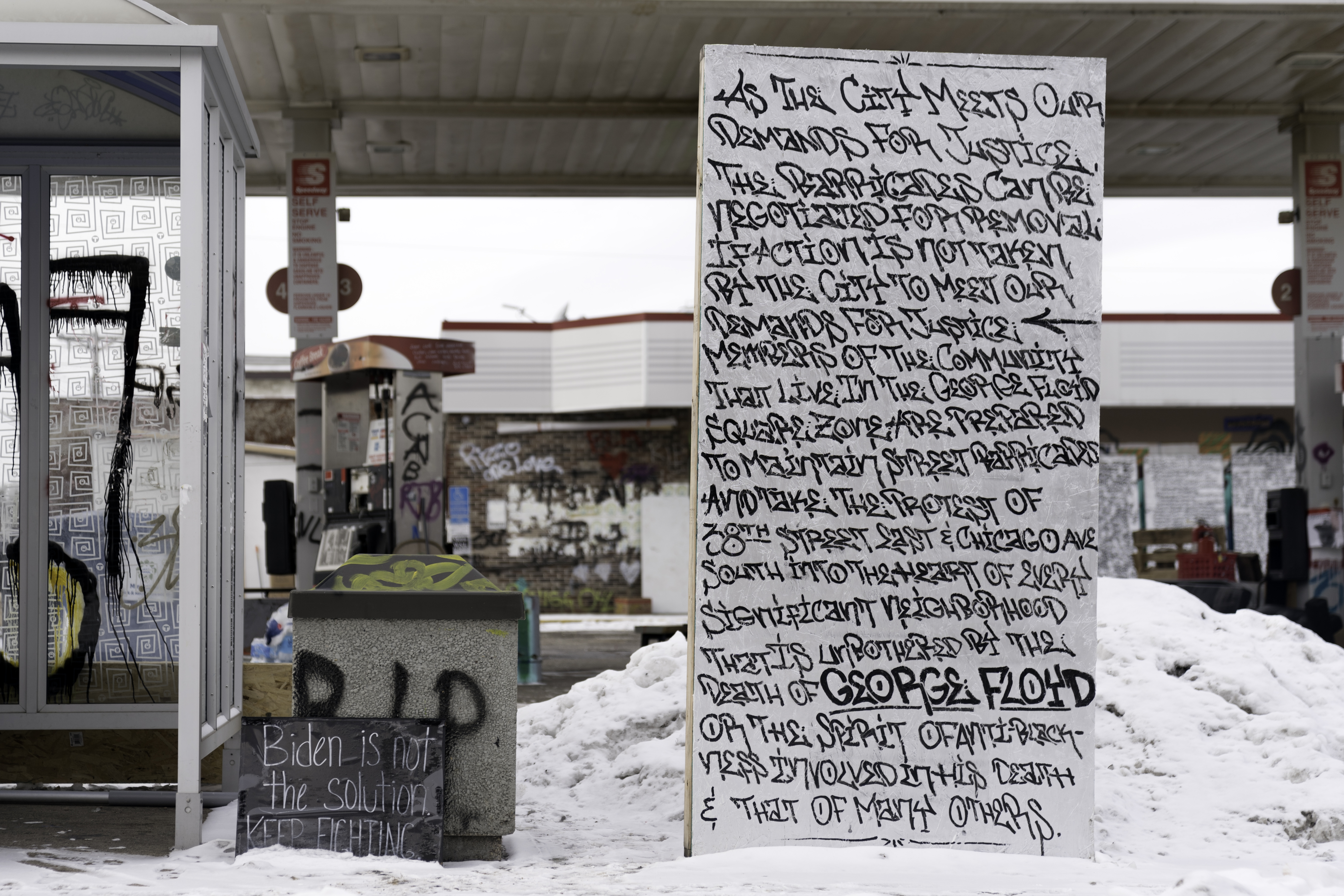
"Biden is not the solution, keep fighting" sign at George Floyd Square, January 20, 2021.

On the day of the presidential inauguration of Joe Biden, nearly 120 members of several progressive organizations held a peaceful rally in Minneapolis to pressure the incoming Biden administration to commit to several left-wing policy positions during its first 100 days in office, such as to reverse Trump administration policies affecting immigrant and minority communities. Protesters gathered at South High School and marched along Lake Street past the Minneapolis Police Department's third precinct building that was set on fire in May 2020 after Floyd's murder. The day's events were organized by the local Black Lives Matter chapter and other social justice organizations. The group's demands included dropping criminal charges against people who were prosecuted during the 2020 George Floyd protests in Minneapolis–Saint Paul and the 600 people who were arrested on November 4, 2020, for blocking traffic on Interstate 94.

=== Police reform protests, March 6 ===
Approximately 150 people marched and rallied at the governor's mansion in Saint Paul ahead of the trial of Derek Chauvin scheduled for March 8, 2021. The event, organized by Families Supporting Families Against Police Violence, sought to pressure state and local officials to enact police reform legislation and reevaluate cases where people died under police pursuit or arrest. In another protest march, demonstrators in Minneapolis marched from George Floyd Square to the Hennepin County Government Center and back.

=== Trial of Derek Chauvin protests, March 7–April 19 ===
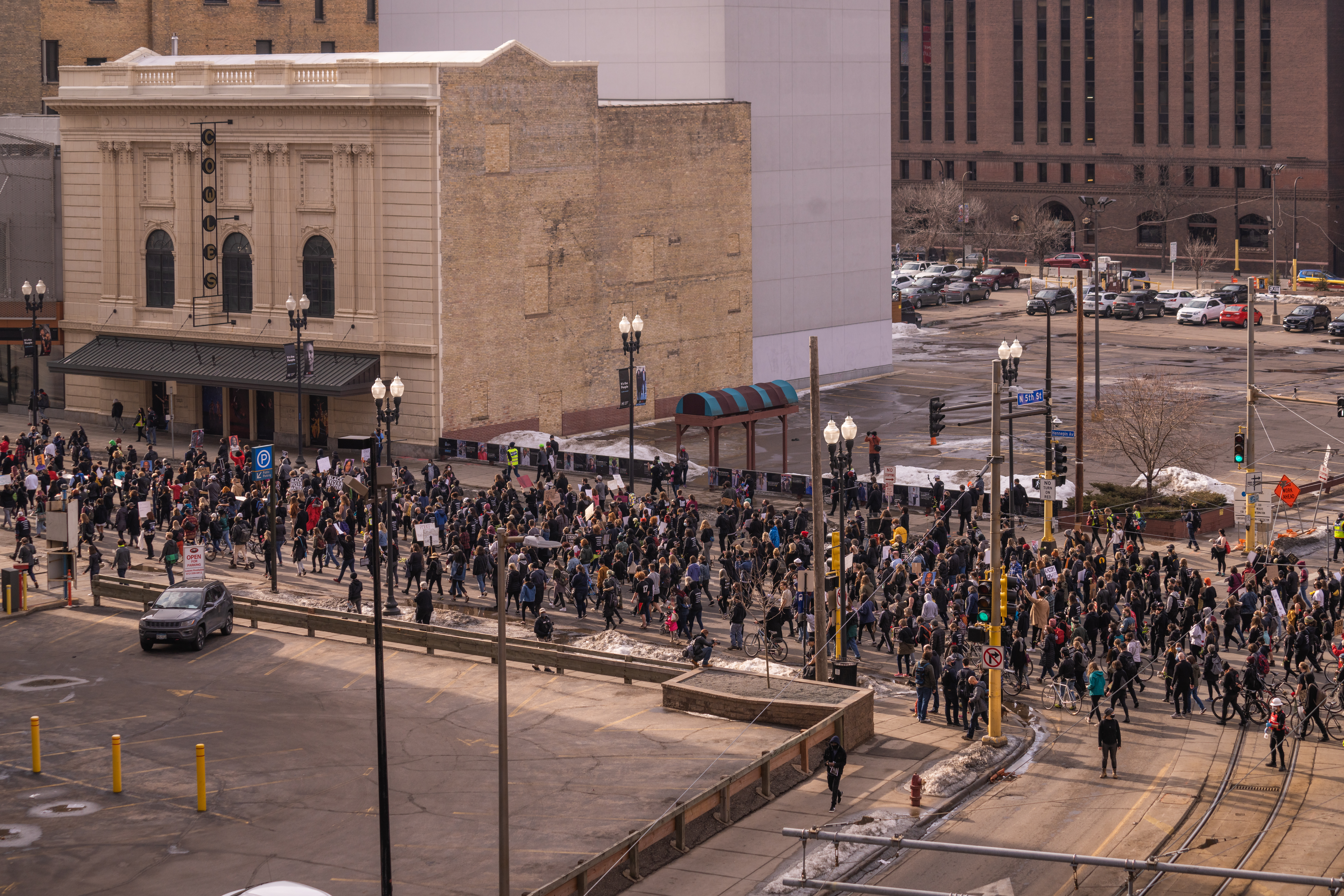
Protest march in Minneapolis, March 7, 2021

On March 7, 2021, several hundred protesters marched in downtown Minneapolis and rallied outside the Hennepin County Government Center building to mourn George Floyd and call for reform of policing. The event, dubbed the "'I Can't Breathe' Silent March For Justice" by its organizers, came a day before jury selection in the trial of Derek Chauvin. Protesters carried a white-colored replica coffin adorned with red flowers. Another group of faith leaders held a "Pray for MN" gathering at the government center building later that afternoon.

Approximately 1,000 protesters gathered peacefully outside a downtown courthouse as Chauvin's trial commenced on March 8 to call for justice for Floyd and raise broader issues of racial injustice. Officials had surrounded the facility with a temporary concrete barrier, metal fencing, and barbed wire in anticipation of potential unrest. Protests and rallies planned for George Floyd Square were halted for several days after a fatal shooting there on March 6, 2021.

On March 28, 2021, the day before opening statements in Chauvin's trial, several rallies and protests were held in Minneapolis. Floyd's family and Al Sharpton hosted a vigil at the Greater Friendship Missionary Baptist Church in Minneapolis. Separately, protesters marched in downtown Minneapolis to demand justice for Floyd and rallied at the Hennepin County Government Center and City Hall, and some demonstrators parked cars on the Metro light-rail tracks, which closed train traffic for several hours. At the intersection where Floyd was murdered, a group of people who self-identified as "anarchists" and "anti-fascists" held a training workshop on how to avoid arrest and keep calm if detained by police. Protesters claimed that the intersection was not public property and demanded that journalists leave the area before the workshop began.

George Floyd Square remained an important gathering place during Chauvin's trial for people protesting racial injustice and seeking justice for Floyd. The square hosted daily visitors from around the country who made pilgrimages there. Groups of protesters also gathered outside Hennepin County Government Center in Minneapolis during Chauvin's trial and marched on the streets calling for justice. On April 6, several civil rights leaders, including Sharpton and former New York Governor David Paterson, led a rally outside the government building and prayed for Chauvin's conviction. The trial concluded on April 19, 2021, and the jury began deliberations.

=== "Stop Asian Hate" rally, March 28 ===
On March 28, 2021, hundreds of people, and more than 20 community organizations, participated in a "Stop Asian Hate" rally at the state capitol building. The event was in reaction to recent Atlanta spa shootings, where eight people had died, most of them Asian-American women.

=== Daunte Wright protests, April 11–December 23 ===
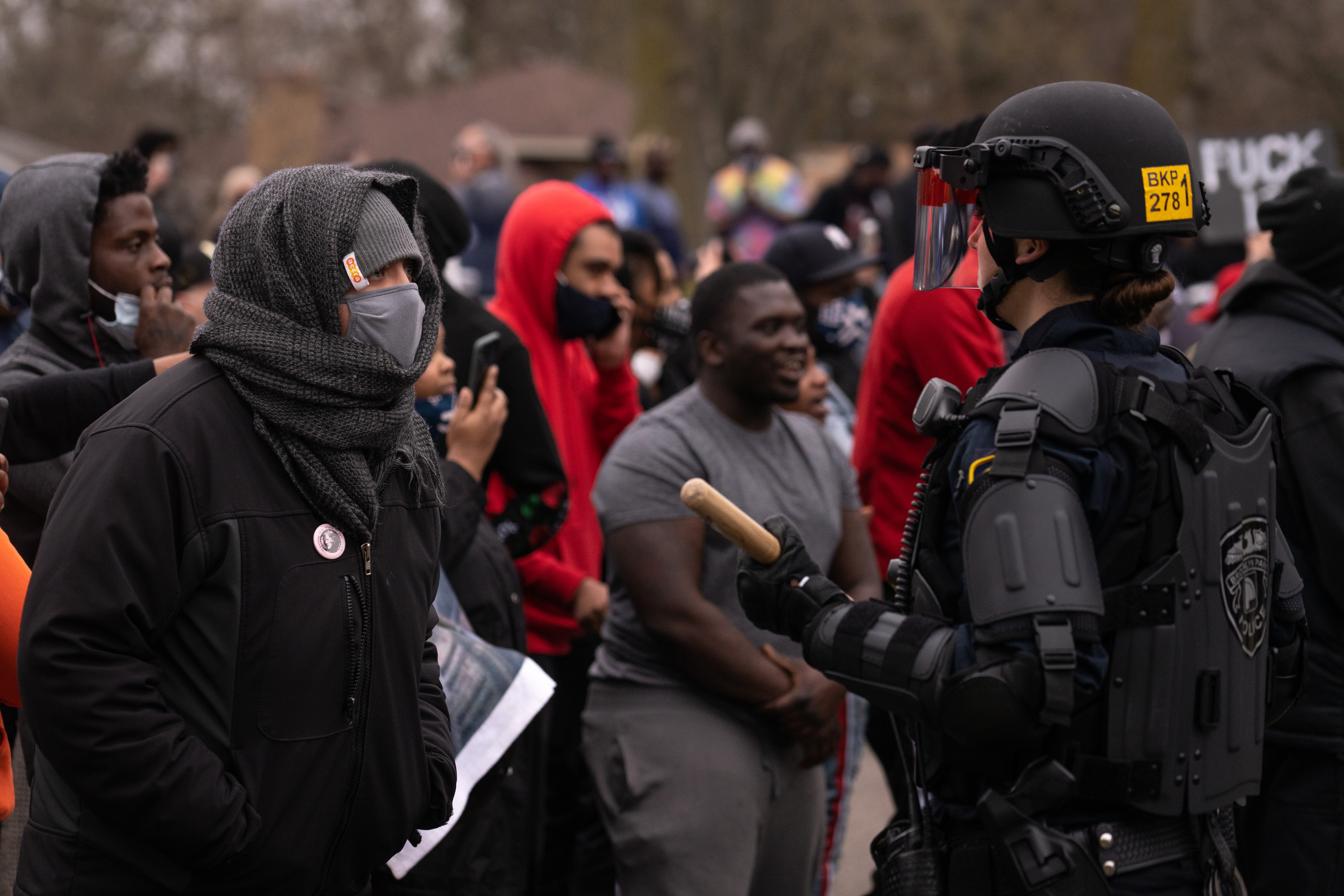
Protest after the killing of Daunte Wright in Brooklyn Center, April 11, 2021

On April 11, 2021, at 1:48 p.m., an officer with the police department of Brooklyn Center, a suburb of Minneapolis-Saint Paul, shot 20-year-old Daunte Wright, a black man, during a traffic stop. Wright had an outstanding warrant for his arrest. As officers attempted to detain him, a struggle ensued and Wright reentered his vehicle. An officer discharged her firearm, believing she was using her taser gun instead, striking Wright before he drove off. Wright crashed his vehicle several blocks away. Though EMS arrived and attempted to revive him, Wright was pronounced dead at the scene of the crash. Wright's girlfriend was also a passenger in the car. She sustained non-life-threatening injuries from the crash and was transported to the hospital.

The event unfolded as the trial of Derek Chauvin was underway in Minneapolis. Wright's death occurred approximately 10 miles (16 km) from the intersection where Floyd was murdered. As news of the Brooklyn Center incident spread, family members of Wright, neighbors to the car crash, and protesters began gathering at the car crash scene in Brooklyn Center in what was initially a peaceful demonstration. Several protesters came from another rally organized by families of people who had been killed by police that they had held earlier in the day in Saint Paul. The crowd grew to several hundred people by evening as they demanded more information from police investigators. As tension at the scene rose over the ensuing hours, police in tactical gear arrived, formed a line, and moved in when demonstrators began climbing on police vehicles and throwing bricks.

Over the next days, tense protests and sporadic looting took place and resulted in the deployment of the Minnesota National Guard, Minnesota State Patrol, and Hennepin County sheriff's office. Thousands of people participated in protests and rallies in Brooklyn Center and elsewhere. Authorities clashed with some protesters, resulting in several dozen arrests.

=== Demonstrations awaiting the Chauvin trial verdict, April 19 ===
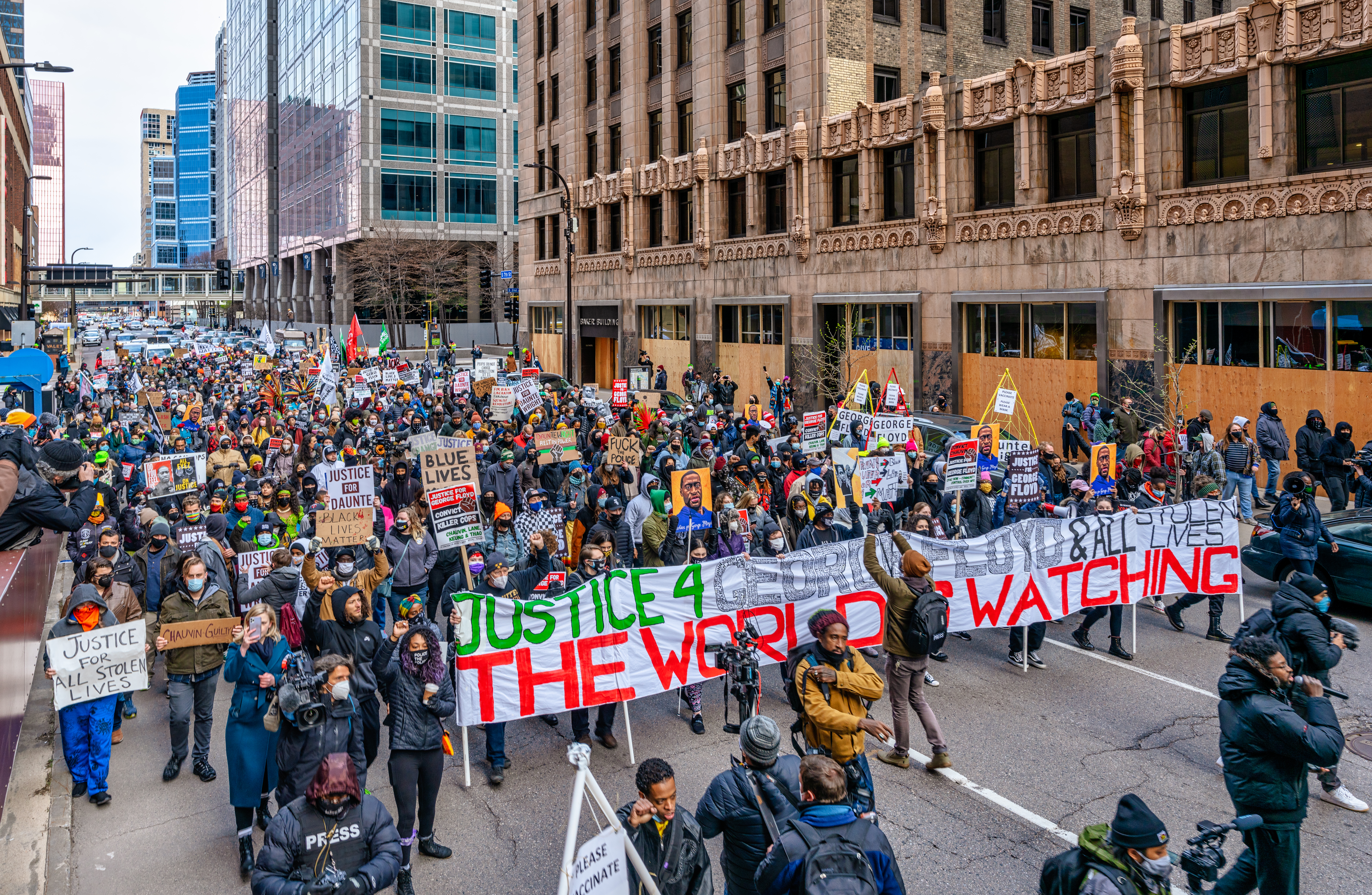
Justice for George Floyd March in Minneapolis during jury deliberations on April 19, 2021

Derek Chauvin's trial concluded in Minneapolis just after 5 p.m. on April 19, 2021, and the jury began deliberations that evening. The trial was one of the most closely watched cases of police brutality in the United States. Governor Walz declared a peacetime emergency and deployed 3,000 Minnesota National Guard troops and state patrol officers to assist local law enforcement. He also sought deployment of law enforcement officers from nearby states. Some schools in the metropolitan area announced plans to proactively move to distance learning, and some businesses boarded up out of worries of potential unrest. The killing of Daunte Wright on April 11 and the subsequent protests intersected with the looming verdict. Days earlier, U.S. Representative Maxine Waters told demonstrators in Minnesota that they should "stay on the street" and "get more confrontational" if Chauvin was acquitted.

On April 19, twenty activist groups coordinated a large demonstration and march through the streets in Minneapolis near the Hennepin County Government Center building where Chauvin's trial was held. Protesters made several demands: lengthy sentences for the officers involved in Floyd's murder, police reform legislation in Minnesota, to have charges dropped against demonstrators in Brooklyn Center and at other recent events, and for officials to end Operation Safety Net and other counter-protest measures. Protesters and law enforcement authorities did not engage with one another and the event was peaceful. A protest group of about 40 to 50 people gathered outside the Brooklyn Center police station that evening.

Protest events occurred without incident and officials described them as peaceful. Officials with the Operation Safety Net also reported three business burglaries in Minneapolis and that a Minnesota Department of Natural Resources vehicle deployed for potential unrest was broken into and had a firearm stolen from it. Officials did not make any arrests connected to April 19 events.

=== Chauvin verdict announcement demonstrations, April 20 ===
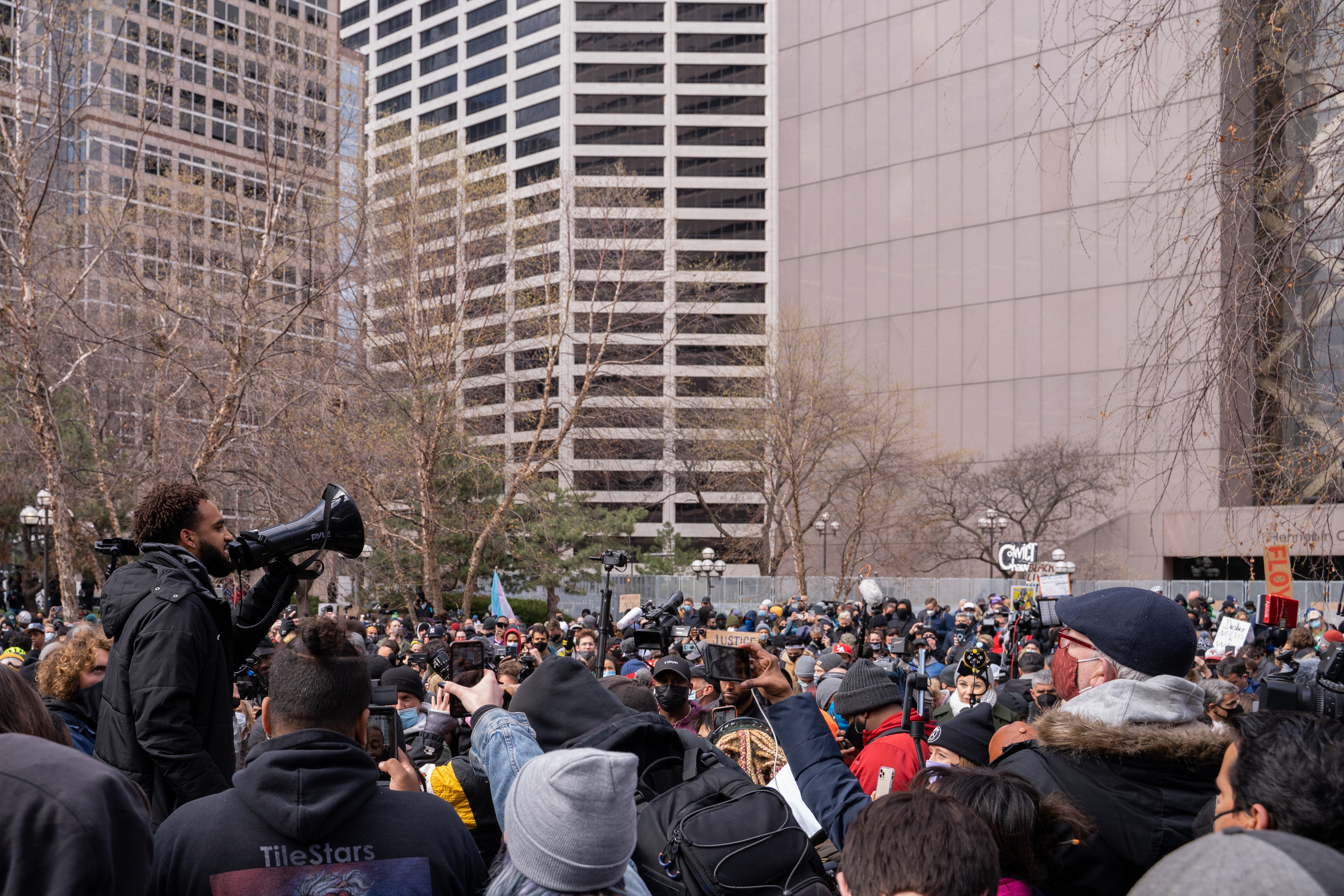
Crowd gathers for the verdict announcement in the trial of Derek Chauvin, April 20, 2021.

Derek Chauvin was found guilty of murdering George Floyd on April 20, 2021. People gathered outside the Hennepin County Government Center where the trial was held and at the 38th and Chicago Avenue intersection where Floyd was murdered to await the verdict at approximately 4 p.m. Crowds chanted in approval as the verdict was read that found Chauvin guilty on all charges. As news of the verdict spread, thousands of people marched in downtown Minneapolis and others gathered at 38th and Chicago Avenue in elation over the outcome. Protesters also called for reforms to policing and justice for other black men killed by police.

=== Dight Avenue name change petition, June ===
In mid 2021, a petition drive led by disability activist Noah McCourt requested that the City of Minneapolis rename Dight Avenue, a street in the Longfellow community that had been named decades earlier for the controversial Charles Fremont Dight. After consulting with Dight Avenue residents and offering several options, city officials decided to honor John Cheatham's legacy of racially integrating the city's fire department by renaming Dight Avenue after him, with the change taking place in 2022.

=== Winston Boogie Smith protests and Uptown unrest, June 3–November 3 ===
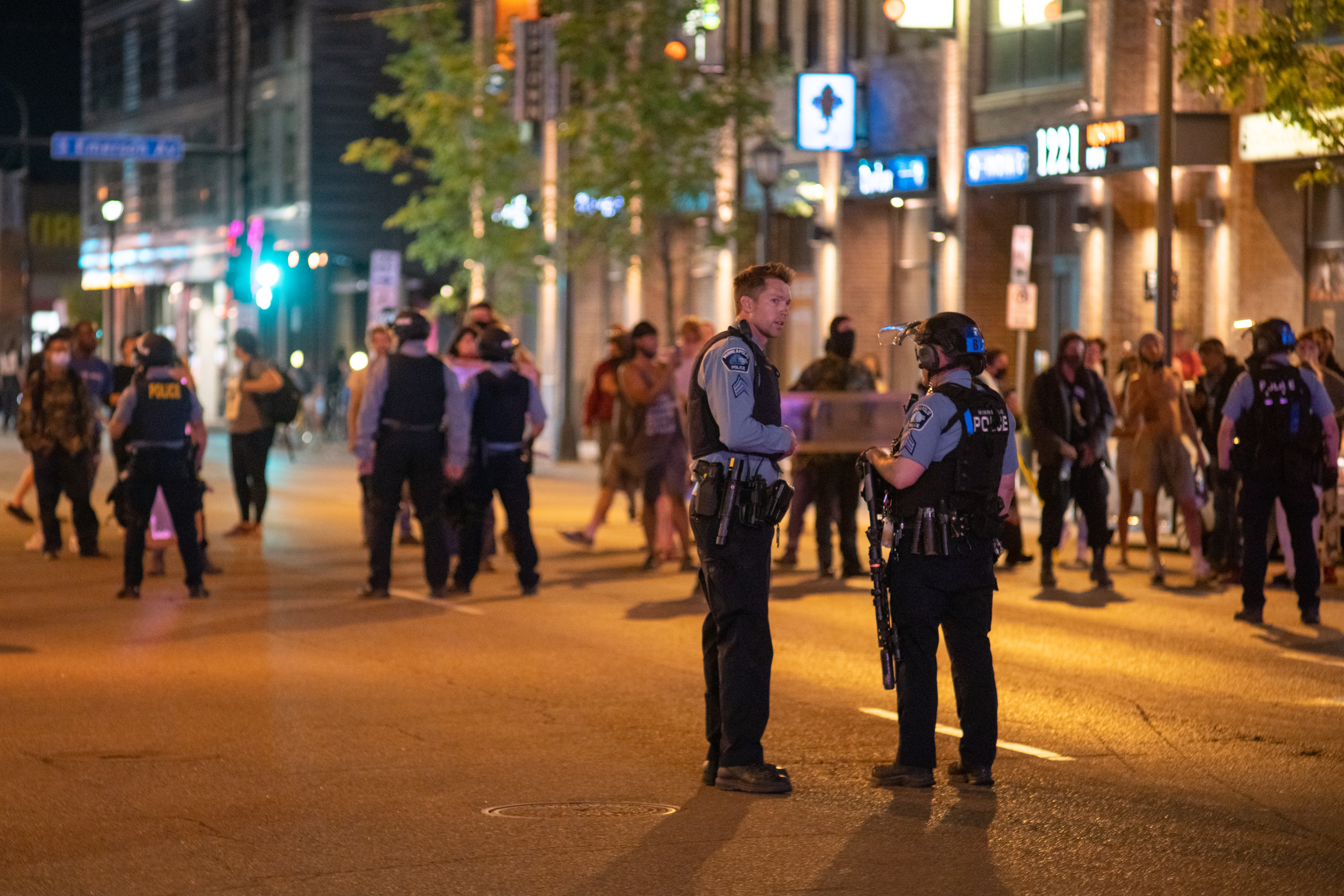
Minneapolis police and demonstrators on West Lake Street, June 4, 2021

Winston Boogie Smith, a 32-year-old black man, was shot and killed by law enforcement authorities on June 3, 2021, as they attempted to apprehend him at a parking ramp in the Uptown neighborhood of Minneapolis. Protests following the killing began on June 3 and continued for several days, primarily in Uptown. Soon after the shooting, Smith's family demanded greater law enforcement transparency and the release of any surveillance footage that captured the incident. Civil rights activists and Smith's friends and family disputed law enforcement's accounts of the incident. Local organization Communities United Against Police Brutality held a press conference near the shooting site on June 4 to call for officials to release video footage and other details of the shooting. Smith's family and friends held a peaceful vigil the evening of June 4 at the parking ramp where he was killed, and participated in a protest march on June 6. Activist Nekima Levy Armstrong led a protest on June 8 outside the home of Minnesota's U.S. Marshal, Ramona Dohman, calling for her resignation. Armstrong alleged that Dohman, a Trump administration appointee, had a conflict of interest due to a past working relationship with the Minnesota Bureau of Criminal Apprehension. Protests were held over subsequent days, with demonstrators periodically occupying an intersection near where Smith was killed.

=== Uptown vehicle-ramming incident, June 13 ===
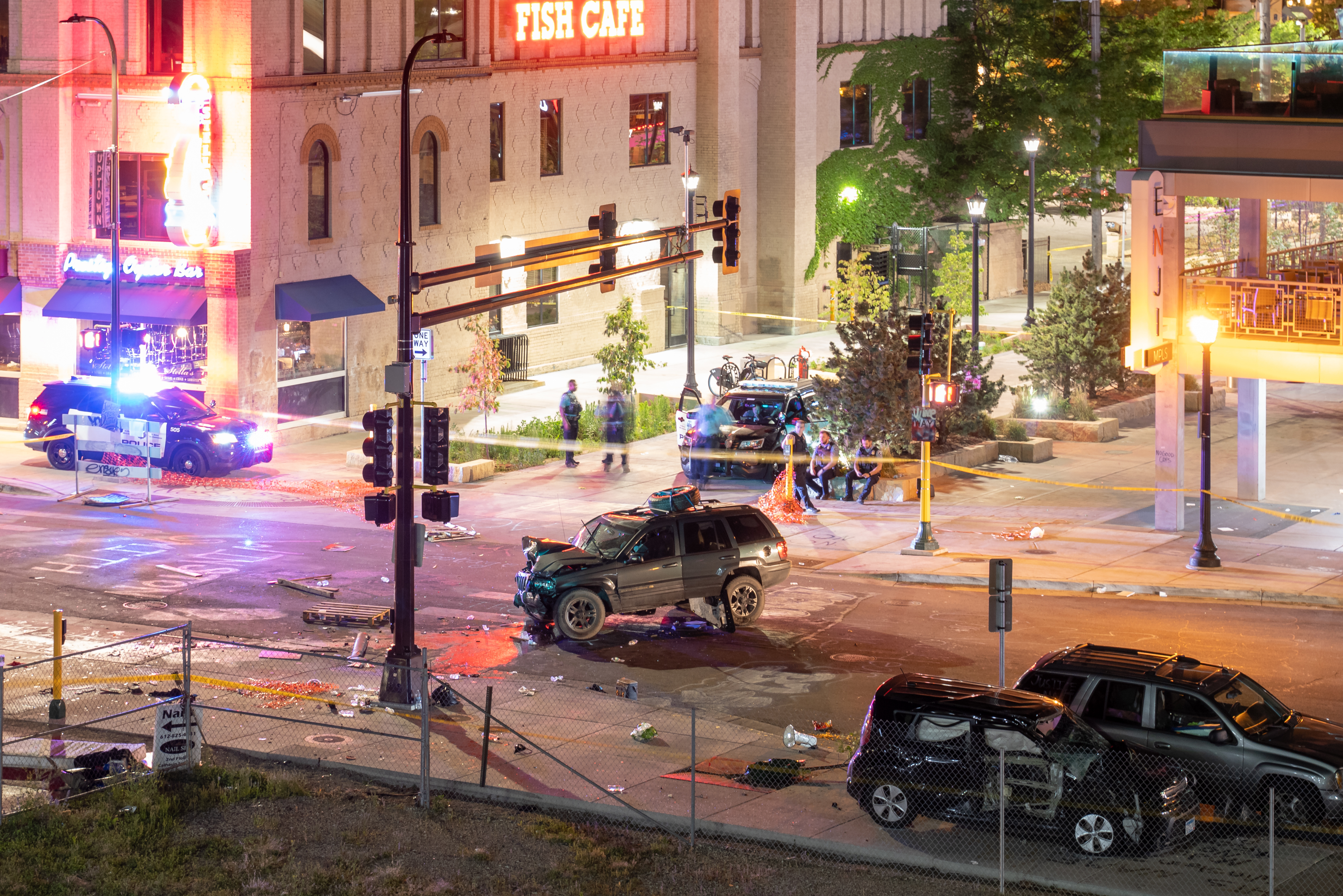
The secured crime scene on June 14, 2021, several hours after Deona Knajdek was killed

On June 13, 2021, Nicholas Kraus, a 35-year-old man from Saint Paul, drove a car into a crowd of demonstrators who had gathered as a part of the ongoing Winston Boogie Smith protests, killing Deona Marie Knajdek and injuring three others. That evening, demonstrators had blocked the intersection of West Lake Street and Girard Avenue. At approximately 11:39 p.m. CDT, in a Jeep Cherokee, Kraus drove into the crowd at a high speed, striking a parked vehicle that had been used to block off the intersection to traffic, which then collided with protesters. On June 16, he was charged with second-degree intentional murder and two counts of assault with a deadly weapon in relation to the crash, after allegedly telling investigators that he had accelerated toward the crowd in an attempt to clear the barricades that were protecting protesters. To avoid trial, Kraus pleaded guilty on October 24, 2022, to charges of unintentional murder and second-degree assault with a dangerous weapon.

=== "Taking Back Pride" event, June 27 ===
In a protest event called "Taking Back Pride", demonstrators marched in downtown Minneapolis on June 27 as a counter to contemporary Pride parade festivities, and referenced the protest-origin of the U.S. LGBTQ movement that began with the 1969 Stonewall riots Participants of the June 27 march said that police were not welcome at the event, refused to cooperate with law enforcement for permits, and did not invite corporate partnerships. Demonstrators demanded police accountability for the killings of Daunte Wright and Winston Smith, and called for greater protections of Black transgender people.

=== Council President Andrea Jenkins vehicle blocking incident, June 27 ===
A group of activists that included Donald Hooker Jr, a leader with Twin Cities Coalition for Justice 4 Jamar (referring to Jamar Clark), confronted Minneapolis Council Vice President Andrea Jenkins near Loring Park in the afternoon of June 27. Jenkins—a transgender African-American woman—had attended an earlier Pride event. For several hours, the group blocked the car she was a passenger in and presented a list of six demands that Jenkins was asked to sign her agreement to. The demands including dropping charges against protesters in recent demonstrations, the immediate resignation of Mayor Jacob Frey, continuing the closure of George Floyd Square, and providing more information about investigations of recent police killings. After Jenkins signed the agreement, activists moved out of the way to allow the vehicle to drive away. Hooker posted a 23-minute video of part of the encounter to Facebook. In a statement about the incident, Jenkins said she was treated inhumanely and held against her will by the demonstrators.

=== Philando Castile commemoration, July 6 ===
Five years after the shooting of Philando Castile by a police officer in the Twin Cities suburb of St. Anthony, Castile's family and a crowd of 200 people gathered and marched outside the governor's mansion in Saint Paul. They expressed their desire for the state legislature to enact several police reform measures, such as limiting pretextual traffic stops.

=== Leneal Frazier demonstration, July 7 ===
On July 7, a group of approximately 40 people who were mourning the death of Leneal Frazier, a 40-year-old man from Saint Paul, blocked Lyndale Avenue in the Camden neighborhood of Minneapolis. Frazier, an uninvolved bystander, was killed on July 6 by a Minneapolis police squad car that was pursuing a robbery suspect in a vehicle that had reportedly been carjacked. While in pursuit, the squad car struck several vehicles, including Frazier's, near the intersection of Lyndale Avenue and 41st Avenue North at approximately 12:30 a.m. CDT. Frazier was a relative of Darnella Frazier, the then-teenager who filmed George Floyd's murder on her cellphone on May 25, 2020. Brian Cummings, the Minneapolis police officer who crashed into Frazier's vehicle on July 6, was charged with second-degree manslaughter and criminal vehicular homicide.

=== Judge Regina Chu protest, November 6 ===
Demonstrators gathered outside a downtown Minneapolis condominium to demand that the State v. Potter trial be broadcast live for public view. The trial of former Brooklyn Center police office Kimberly Potter was related to the April 11, 2021, killing of Daunte Wright during a traffic stop. During the November 6 protest event, a demonstrator recorded a Facebook livestream of himself gaining entry to the building and protesting outside the door of what he believed was Judge Chu's unit. Chu no longer resided at the building at the time of the protest. Cortez Rice, a resident of Minneapolis, was later charged in Hennepin County for harassment involving retaliation against a judicial officer.

=== Prior Lake student protests, November 11, 19 & 22 ===
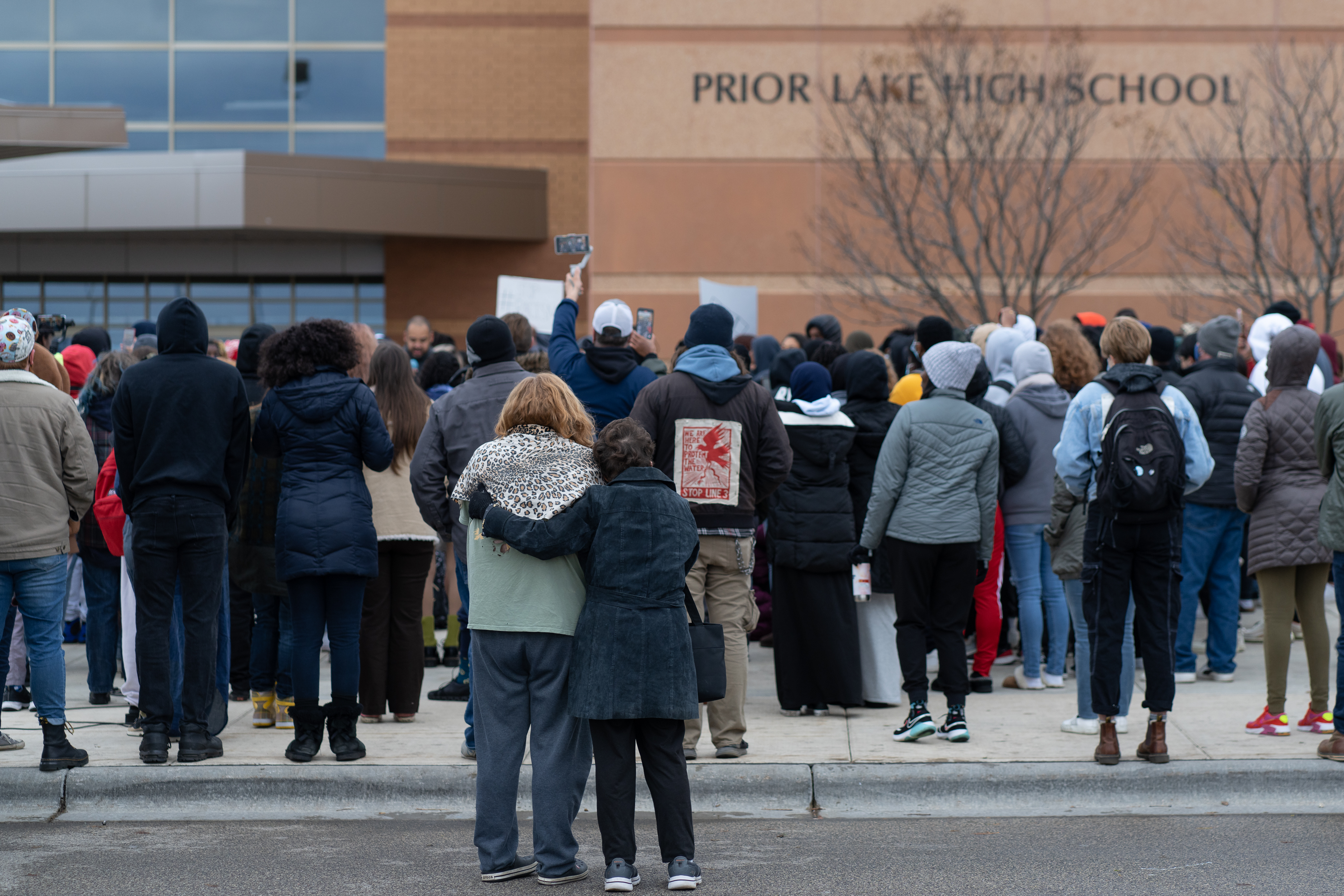
Protest against racism at Prior Lake High School, November 11, 2021

On November 11, hundreds of people participated in a protest in the Minneapolis–Saint Paul suburb of Savage to express anger at the contents of a video that captured a Prior Lake High School student directing racial slurs at another Black student. Protesters, who gathered outside the school that closed early anticipation of the event, denounced the incident and what they viewed as persistent Islamophobia and racism in the Prior Lake Savage Area School District.

Dozens attended a rally organized by Minnesota Teen Activists on November 19 outside U.S. Bank Stadium in downtown Minneapolis to support students who spoke out against racism at Prior Lake High School. Raucous activists confronted members of the Prior Lake-Savage Area School Board at a meeting on November 22. Board members walked out when an activist interrupted the meeting with a profane outburst.

=== Kyle Rittenhouse trial verdict protest, November 20 ===
On November 20, hundreds protested the acquittal of Kyle Rittenhouse at a demonstration in downtown Minneapolis. Rittenhouse was charged with several crimes related to a shooting that killed two people and injured another during the Kenosha unrest on August 20, 2020. Protesters gathered near Hennepin County Government Center and marched through downtown, at times blocking traffic and temporarily shutting down a street intersection. Protesters believed Rittenhouse should have been found guilty of the charges against him.

=== Trial of Kimberly Potter protests, November 30–December 23 ===
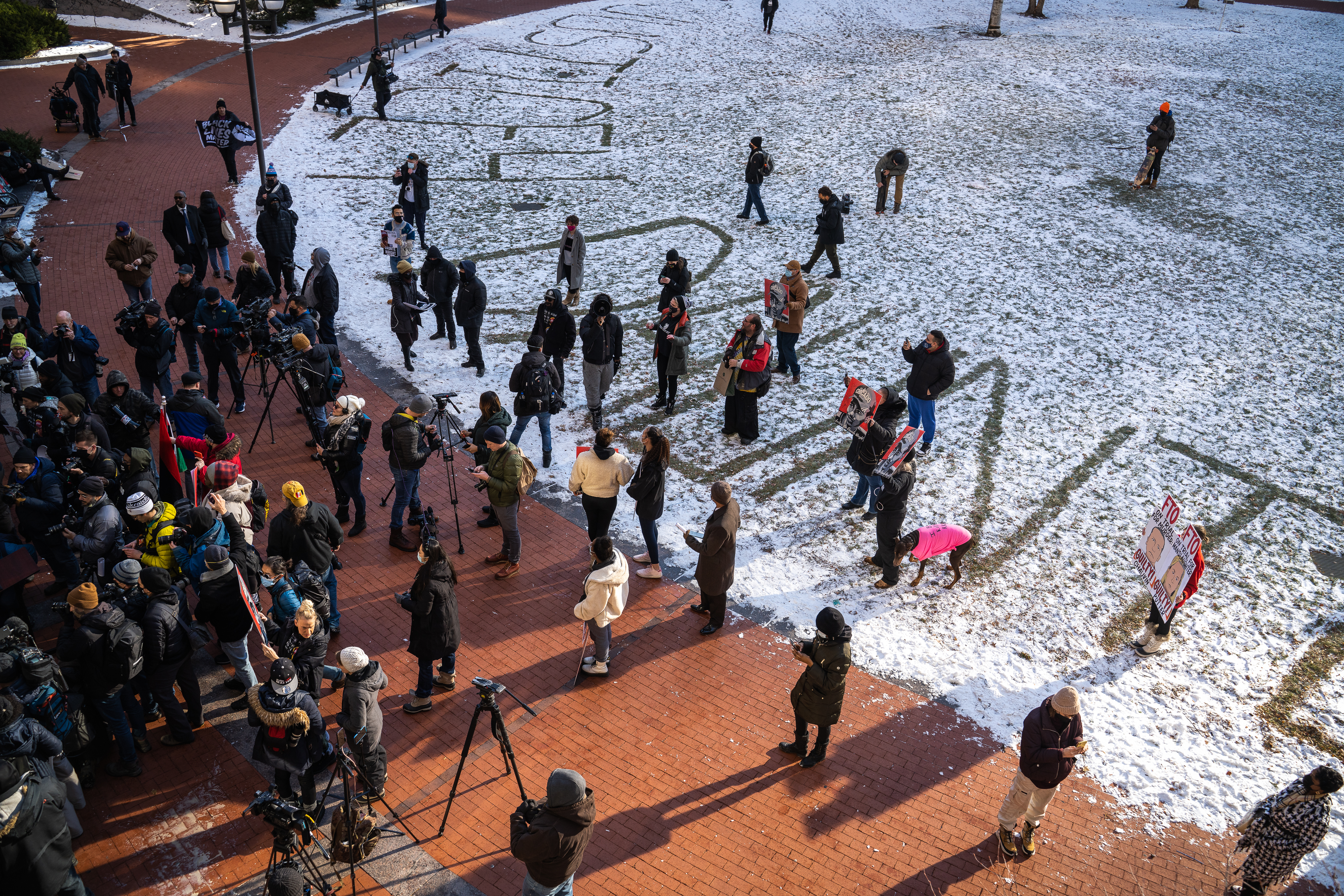
Wright's family, news media, and activists await the trial verdict, December 23, 2021.

Trial proceedings for Kimberly Potter, the Brooklyn Center police officer who shot Daunte Wright in April, began on November 30 in downtown Minneapolis. Demonstrators gathered outside the Hennepin County Government Center building, the venue for her trial. Protests marched through the streets and temporarily blocked vehicular traffic. A vehicle drove through the crowd as protesters urged the driver to stop. A protester climbed on the vehicle as the drive slowly drove away, but was able to dismount safety one block later. No injuries were reported.

The number of protesters dwindled over the course of the Potter trial as outside temperatures became colder. A lone demonstrator was protesting outside the courtroom building by December 17, 2021. Crowds grew in size during the jury deliberation that began on December 22. Potter was convicted of first-degree and second-degree manslaughter charges. The security measures at the Hennepin County Government Center were laxer than during Chauvin's trial, and downtown Minneapolis calmly awaited the verdict with relatively few businesses boarding up. A crowd of about 50 people that had gathered outside the court building celebrated the trial's outcome.

=== Cottage Grove student protest, December 20 ===
Some students at Park High School in Cottage Grove, Minnesota, staged a walkout-style protest over "countless racially motivated incidents" and a school employee's alleged use of the 'n-word'. The event was organized by the Park High School Black Student Union.

== Events in 2022 ==
Arrangement is chronological by the beginning date of each notable event series; timelines for some topics overlap.

=== Dolal Idd protest, January 4 ===
Activists and family members of Dolal Idd rallied in Saint Paul on January 4, 2022, outside Governor Walz's official residence. They called for further investigation of the incident that led to Idd's death and the release of additional evidence in the case.

=== Civil rights trial of Kueng, Lane, and Thao protests, January 24–February 24 ===
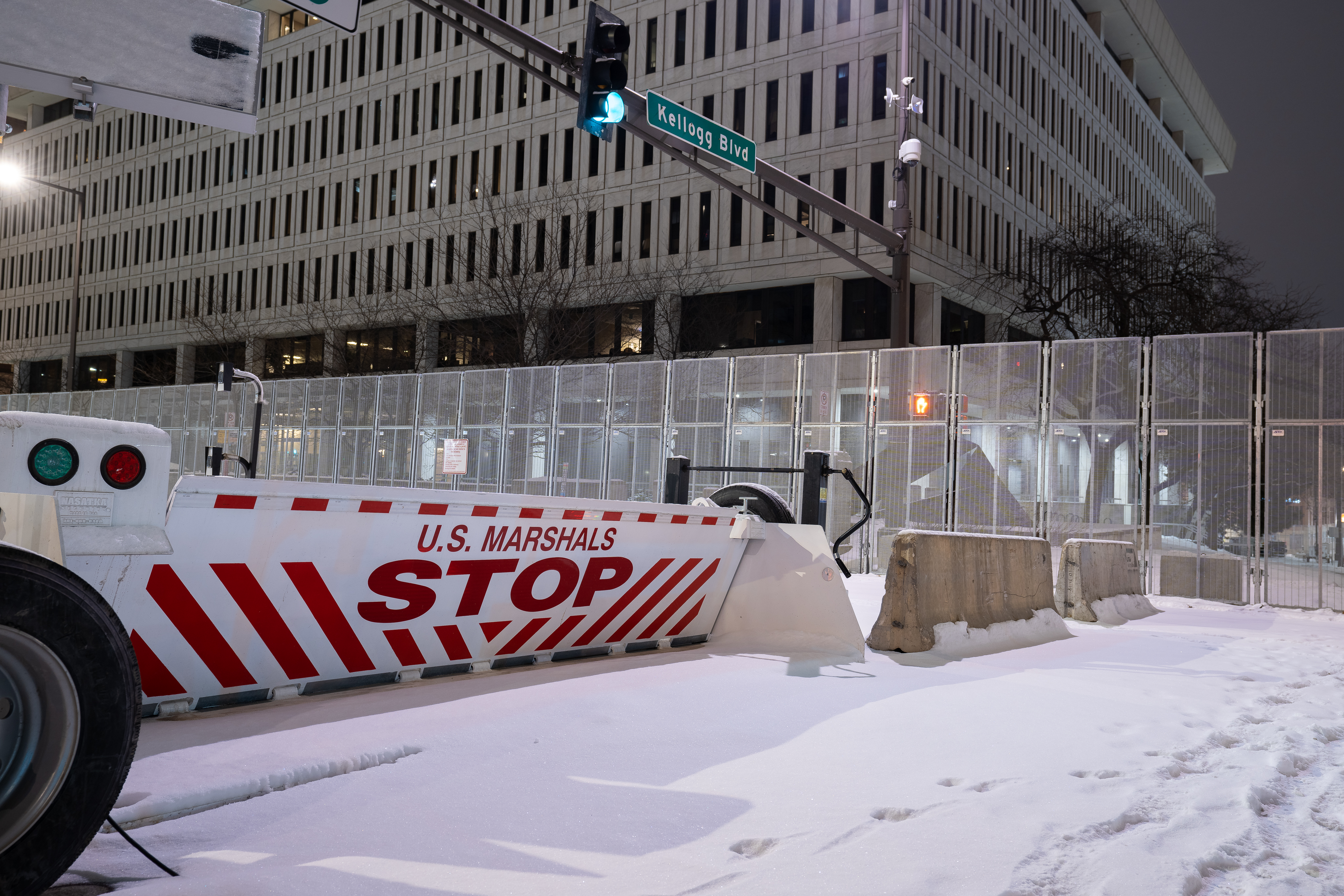
Counter-protest security measures at the Warren E. Burger Federal Building, January 23, 2022

In early 2022, local officials prepared counter-protest measures for potential unrest ahead of the scheduled January 20 start of the federal civil rights trial of J. Alexander Kueng, Thomas Lane, and Tou Thao—Minneapolis police officers who were at the scene of George Floyd's murder. Officials erected security fencing around the Warren E. Burger Federal Building in Saint Paul that contained the courtroom for the trial. Before the trial, protesters said they were concerned about its outcome and were prepared to demonstrate. Protest demonstrations were held in the streets surrounding the courtroom building during the trial.

=== Amir Locke protests, February 2–April 8 ===
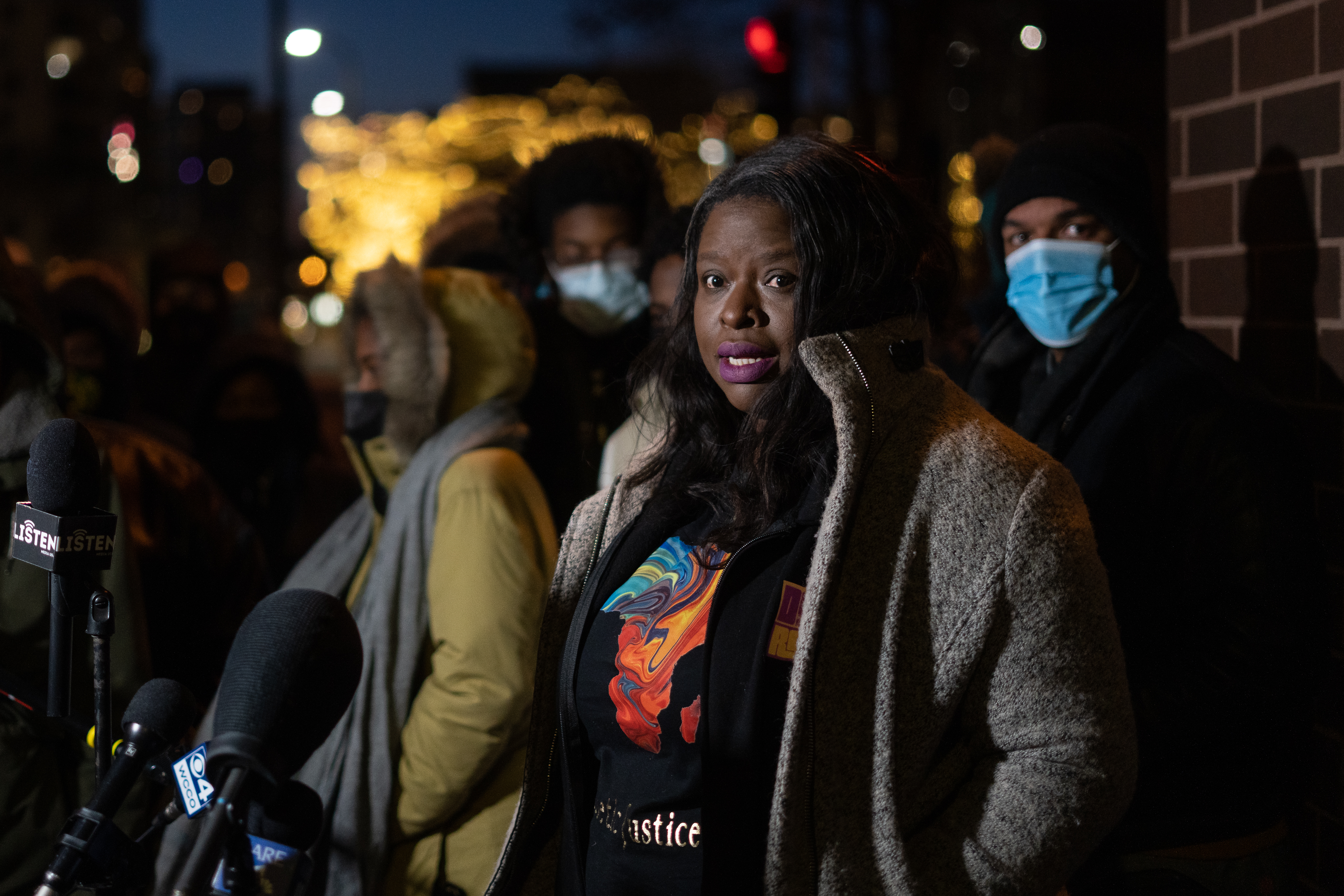
Civil rights activists speak about the killing of Amir Locke, February 2, 2022.

At 6:48 a.m. on February 2, 2022, Minneapolis Police Department officer Mark Hanneman fatally shot Amir Locke, a 22-year-old Black man, while police officers were executing a search warrant at an apartment in downtown Minneapolis. The shooting occurred nine seconds after police entered the apartment while Locke was lying on a couch wrapped in a blanket and holding a gun. Local civil rights advocates called on city officials to release video footage and additional information about the incident, and questioned whether deadly force was necessary. A group of advocates held a vigil on the evening of February 2 outside the downtown apartment building where the killing took place. Several protests were held in Minneapolis and Saint Paul over the subsequent weeks.

=== Murder of Deshaun Hill Jr., February 9 ===
Deshaun Hill Jr., a 15-year-old student at North Community High School, was fatally shot in Minneapolis at about 12:30 p.m. on February 9, 2022. The school principal at North, despite being told not to do so by school district officials, had released students early for the day so they could participate in a planned protest in downtown Minneapolis over the police killing of Amir Locke. The principal attended and encouraged students to participate in the walkout. Hill left school and was walking home when he was fatally shot after a chance encounter with the shooter, Cody Fohrenkam, a 30-year-old Minneapolis resident, who later faced murder charges.

The principal was put on leave by officials, but was reinstated after receiving support from community members. The school district settled with Hill's family for $500,000 in 2023. Hill's family called for criminal charges to be filed against the principal, but Hennepin County Attorney Mary Moriarty declined to do so. Hill was the quarterback on the North football team. His story was the subject of the Showtime docuseries "Boys in Blue", released in 2023.

A jury convicted Fohrenkam of second-degree murder after a three-day trial in January 2023. In February 2023, he was sentenced to 38½ years in prison; he will not be eligible for supervised release for 25 years.

=== Lake Street protest march and vandalism, February 11 ===
On February 11, 2022, approximately 100 people marched through south Minneapolis during the evening to demand justice for the police killings of Amir Locke and Winston Boogie Smith. Along several blocks of Lake Street, several properties were vandalized and tagged with anti-police and anarchist graffiti. Some demonstrators threw rocks at the Minneapolis Police Department's fifth precinct station building.

=== Reaction to the Kimberly Potter sentencing, February 18 ===
Protests were held in reaction to former Brooklyn Center police officer Kimberly Potter's sentence hearing on February 18, 2022, when she received two years in custody rather than the seven years requested by prosecutors for killing Daunte Wright. Protesters gathered in Minneapolis outside the Hennepin County Government Center building where the sentencing hearing was held. A group of about 100 people marched to what they believed to be the residence of Judge Regina Chu, who presided over Potter's trial and sentenced her. In Brooklyn Center that night, people looted the Icon Beauty Supply store.

=== Minneapolis teachers' strike, March 8 to 29 ===
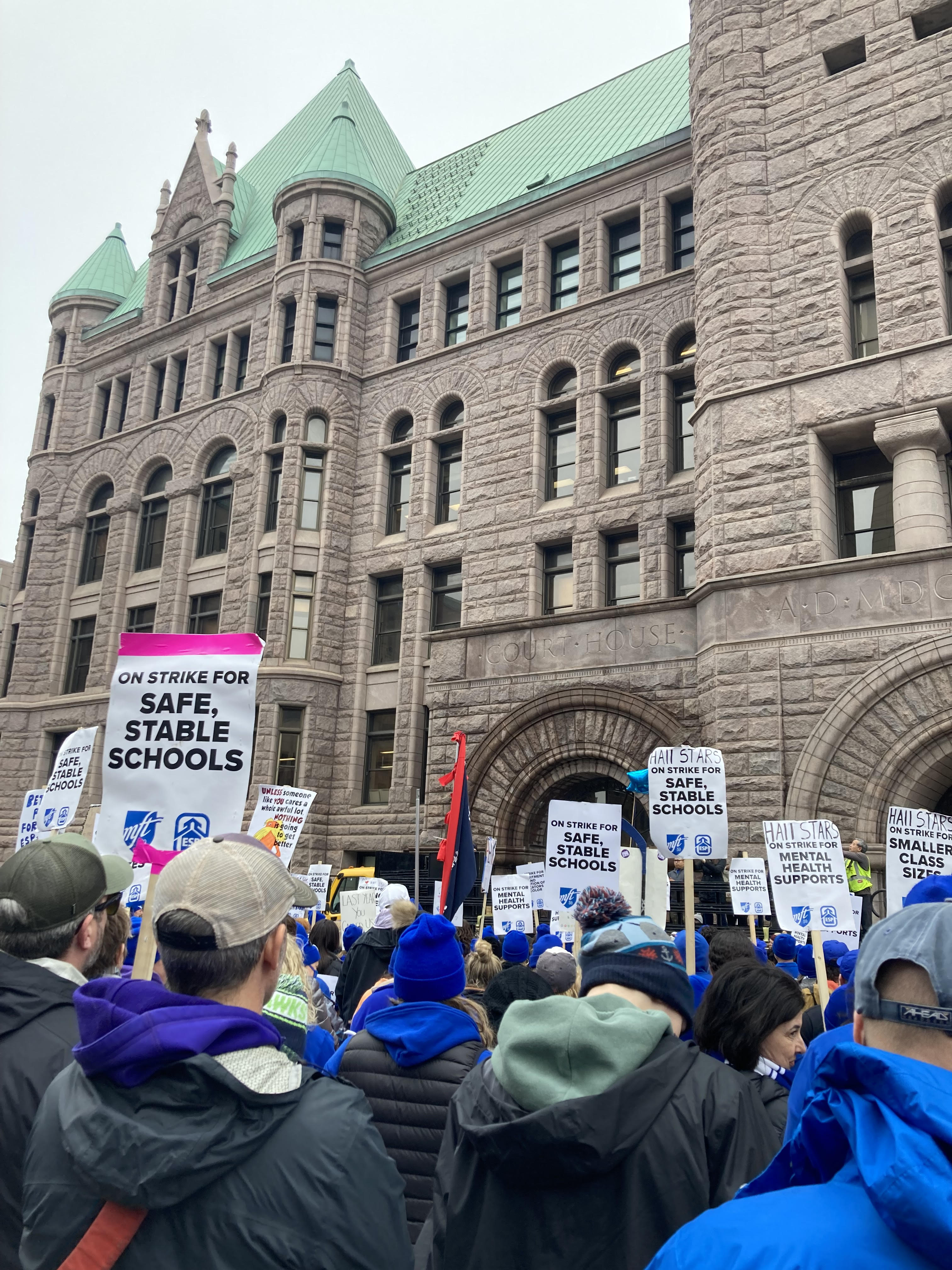
Striking teachers demonstrate at Minneapolis City Hall, March 24, 2022.

The Minneapolis Federation of Teachers, the labor union representing teachers and other education professionals in the Minneapolis Public Schools, went on a three-week strike from March 8 to 29, 2022. Around 4,500 workers went on strike. The strike, the first in the city in nearly 50 years, affected about 30,000 students and resulted in 15 days of canceled classes. It occurred in the aftermath of the largest racial injustice protests in the city's history, with the teachers' union advocating for smaller classes, higher wages, expanded mental health services, and a focus on retaining teachers who are people of color.

=== East Lake Street vandalism, May 28 ===
Under the slogan "Remember May 28", a group of demonstrators marched on East Lake Street in Minneapolis on May 28, 2022, to mark the second anniversary of the burning of the city's third police precinct building in the aftermath of George Floyd's murder. Demonstrators lit off fireworks, spray-painted graffiti messages, and set several shopping carts on fire.

=== Independence Day unrest, July 4 ===
Several Independence Day celebrations resulted in unrest in downtown Minneapolis the night of July 4, 2022. In the late evening, several crowds that had gathered for informal celebrations discharged fireworks at people, cars, and residential buildings, while several street racers performed doughnut maneuvers in the streets. Minneapolis police officers who responded to the scene had fireworks shot at them. Late that night, more than 100 gunshots were reported, and seven people were injured at a mass shooting near Boom Island Park at about 11:00 p.m. Police officers dispersed another crowd at 2:30 a.m. near the Stone Arch Bridge and arrested a 32-year-old woman from Savage for allegedly assaulting an officer and obstructing police activity.

City Counselor Michael Rainville placed primary blame on Somali youth for the July 4 violence in comments he made about public safety in the unrest aftermath. Rainsville's comments received substantial public backlash for singling out the Somali-American community and he later apologized for them.

=== Andrew Tekle Sundberg protests, July 14 & 16 ===
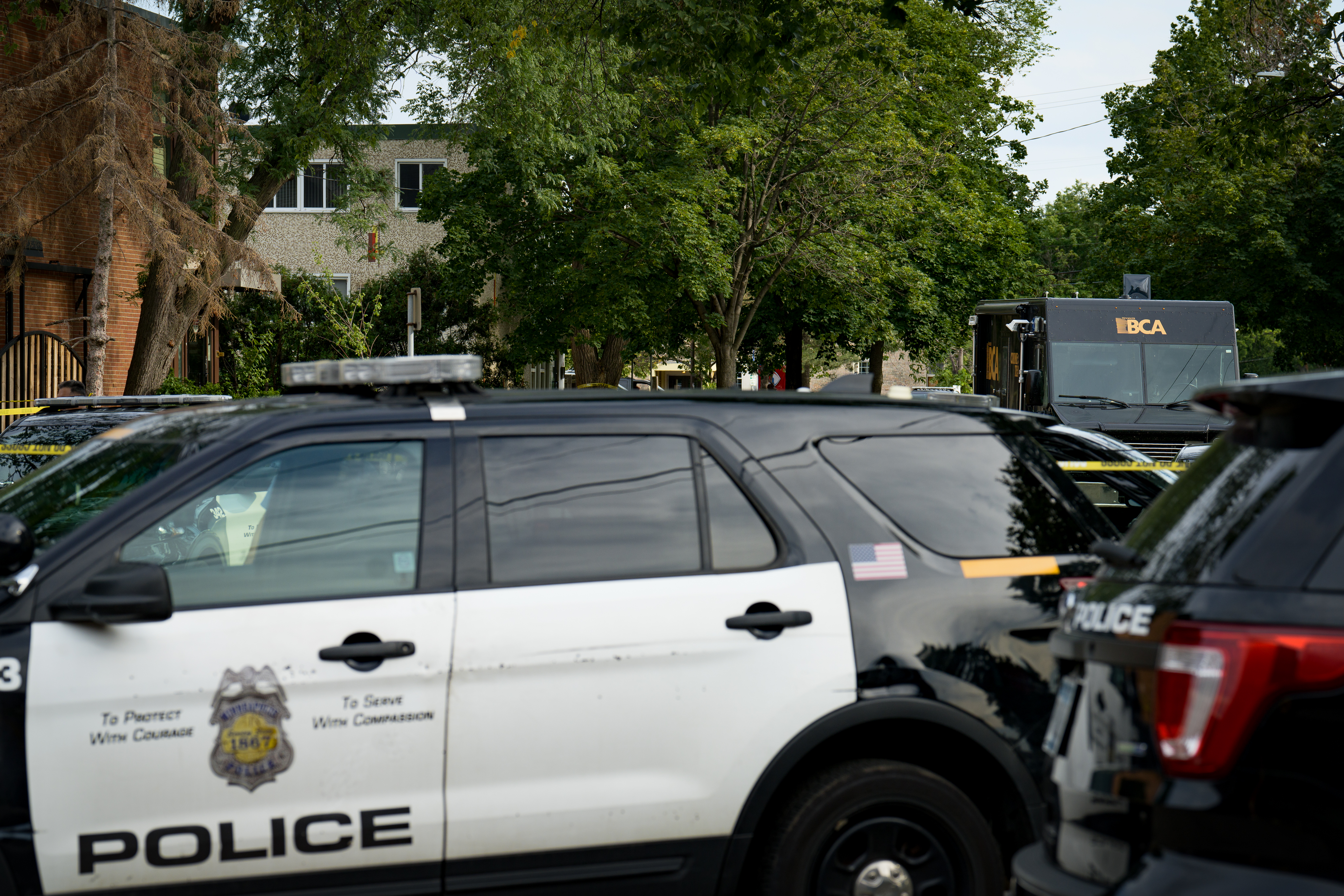
Police and BCA vehicles at the building where Andrew Tekle Sundberg was fatally shot the prior day, June 14, 2022

Andrew Tekle Sundberg, a 20-year-old Ethiopian American man, was shot and killed by Minneapolis police officers on July 14.

At 9:30 p.m. on July 13 at an apartment building on the 900 block of 21st Avenue in the Seward neighborhood, Minneapolis police responded to reports of gunshots being fired from one apartment unit into another. Police who arrived at the scene observed more shots being fired through interior walls and evacuated the apartment building. A six-hour standoff ensued with Sundberg, the alleged assailant, who, according to police, also fired at officers. At about 4:30 a.m. on July 14, two police officer snipers fired their rifles, fatally wounding Sundberg. The shooting is under investigation.

Activists and Sundberg's family held a vigil near the apartment building the evening of July 14. Another rally was held near the building on July 16. Family members, who retained civil rights attorneys Benjamin Crump and Jeff Storms, questioned why Sundberg was shot and sought release of police body camera footage. A woman whose apartment was shot up confronted Sundberg's family and activists during the July 16 demonstration.

Sundberg's killing led to further mistrust between police and community activists, who questioned why police used deadly tactics to end the standoff. Public outrage gave way to protests in Minneapolis, but demonstrations were smaller than in the period after Floyd's murder. Hennepin County Attorney Michael Freeman concluded in a report released on December 21, 2022, that the officers' actions were legally justified and no charges would be filed against them.

=== Winner Gas and Merwin Liquors protest, September 9 ===
After several days of shootings that left two dead and several injured, residents and activists on the north side of Minneapolis staged a protest to block access to and shutdown Winner Gas and Merwin Liquors for several hours. The residents demanded the city permanently close the two businesses as they had been the location of many violent incidents since Floyd's murder. In Minneapolis, the increase in violent crime following Floyd's murder and widespread civil unrest had a disproportionate impact on underserved and Black communities.

=== Jamar Clark car caravan protest, November 17 ===
On November 17, seven years after his killing by a Minneapolis police officer, family members of Jamar Clark and local activists held a car caravan protest rally in north Minneapolis. Sixty vehicles participated in the three-mile drive that began at Camden High School and ended on Plymouth Avenue, where Clark was killed in 2015. Protesters demanded greater community control and oversight of police and noted that they were previously successful in pushing for the elimination of grand juries in Minnesota when investigating police homicides, instead requiring public officials to make a charging determination.

=== Reaction to the killing of Howard Johnson, December 6 ===
On December 6, Black Lives Matter activists and family of Howard Johnson held a vigil at the site of his death.

On December 5, Saint Paul Police Department officers responded to a domestic assault 911 call in the Dayton's Bluff neighborhood allegedly involving Johnson and set up a perimeter to apprehend him. According to the Minnesota Bureau of Criminal Apprehension, a video surveillance camera captured Johnson attempt a carjacking of an uninvolved vehicle while displaying a gun. Police drove up to him and struck him with a squad car, knocking him to the ground. Johnson got up as an officer exited the police car and the two exchanged gunshots. Johnson was struck multiple times. He was transported to a hospital and later died. The shooting is under investigation.

Activists and Johnson's family called for release of body camera footage. It was released on December 8, and appeared to show Johnson engaged in a shootout with police.

=== Immigration reform protest, December 9 ===
On December 8, the Council on American–Islamic Relations and the Minnesota Immigrant Rights Action Committee led a protest in Minneapolis outside the office of U.S. Senator Amy Klobuchar. The demonstrators called on the U.S. Senate to pass American Dream and Promise Act, legislation that would offer permanent protection and a pathway to citizenship for certain immigrants to the United States.

== Events in 2023 ==
=== Manuel Terán protests, January 20 & 21 ===
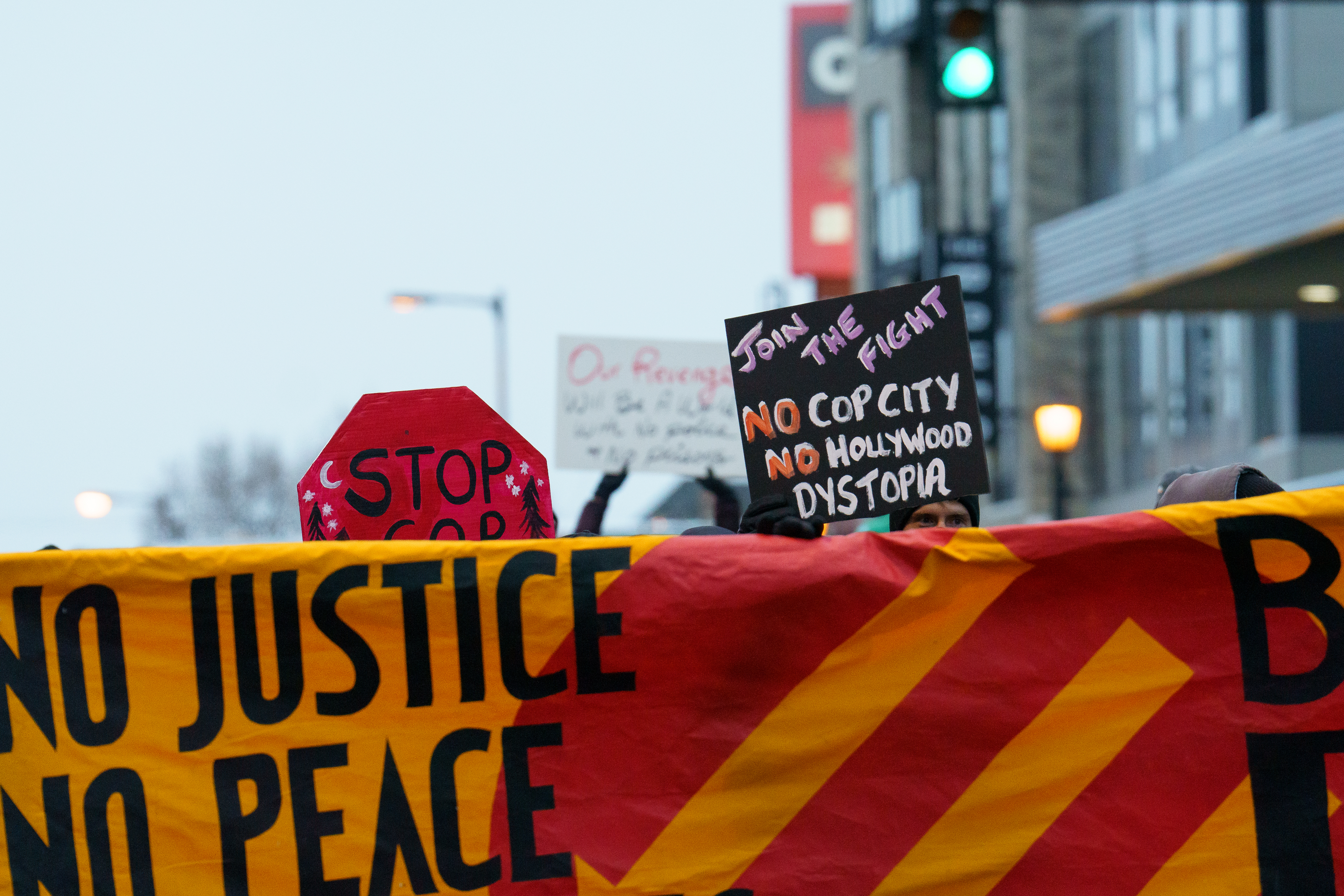
Stop Cop City protest on West Lake Street in Minneapolis on January 21, 2023

About 100 people participated in a vigil in Minneapolis near the Midtown Greenway on January 20 for Manuel "Tortuguita" Terán, who was fatally shot by a police officer while protesting the construction of a police training facility in Atlanta, Georgia. Another protest march was held in Uptown Minneapolis on January 21 and a Bank of America branch was spray-painted with protest messages. The Stop Cop City protests were part of longstanding tension over U.S. police killings since George Floyd's murder. Demonstrators in Minneapolis, Atlanta, and elsewhere opposed the construction of a police facility in a Black and Brown neighborhood. Terán was considered one of the only Black or Brown people to participate in the occupied forest protest and his killing raised further questions of racism in law enforcement conduct.

=== Tyre Nichols protests, January 27–29 ===
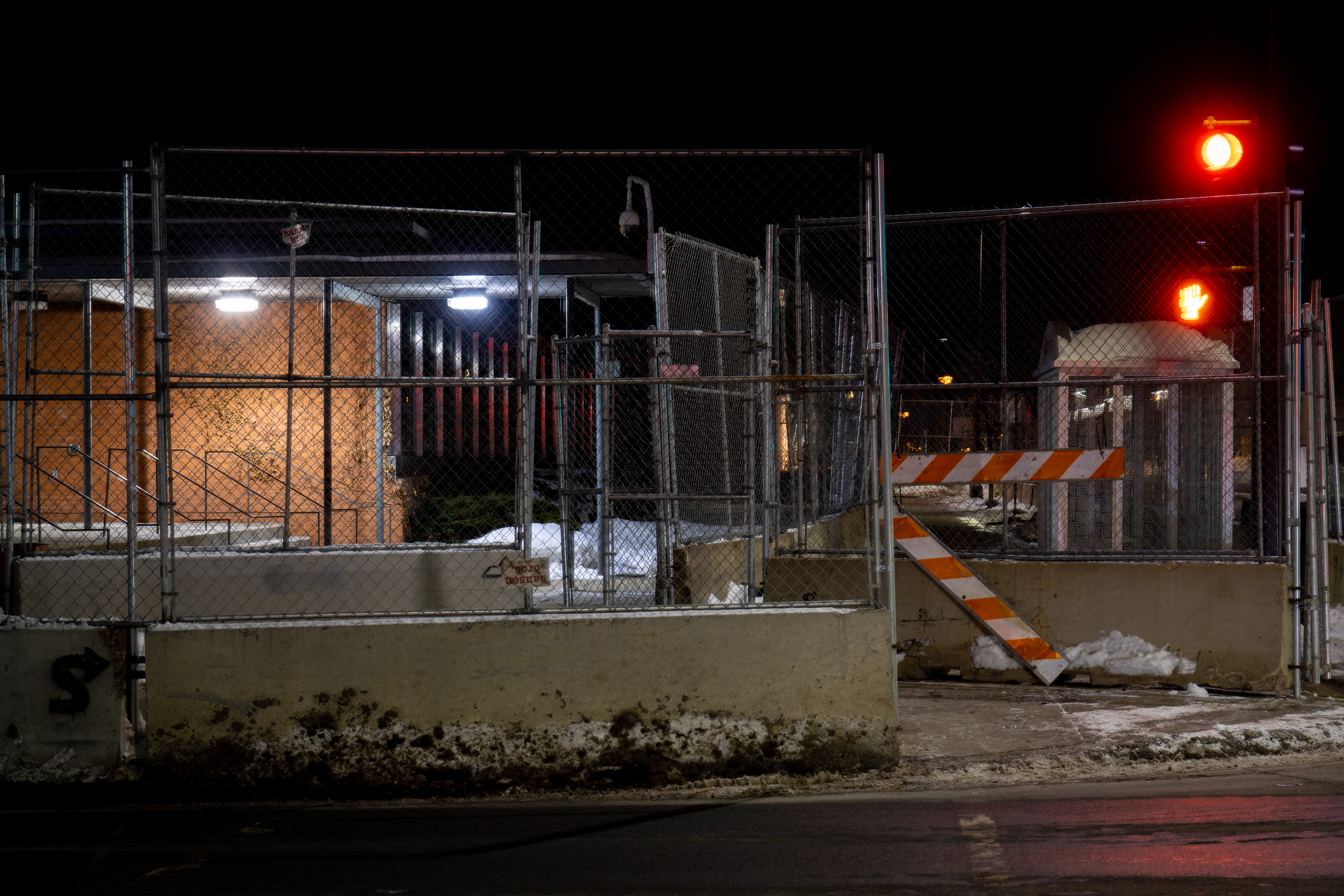
Security fencing erected at the Minneapolis police fifth precinct building shortly after the January 27, 2023 release of the footage containing the Tyre Nichols' beating

Protests were held several U.S. cities on January 27 after video of the January 10 police assault on Tyre Nichols in Memphis, Tennessee, was released. Ahead of the video's release, the ATF sent out a precautionary alert about localities in the Twin Cities for law enforcement agencies to monitor for unrest. The cities of Minneapolis and Saint Paul announced plans to prepare for protests and the possibility of unrest.

Before the January 27 NBA basketball game at Target Center between the Memphis Grizzles and Minnesota Timberwolves, a moment of silence was held for Nichols, who died three days after the police assault.

On January 28, a protest was held in Minneapolis's Saint Anthony Main neighborhood. A law enforcement helicopter and SWAT team observed the demonstration, but the crowd dispersed without incident. Several racial justice organizations held a protest outside Governor Walz's residence in Saint Paul on January 29; about 300 people participated. Demonstrators called on the governor and legislature to enact police reform measures, such as removing qualified immunity for police officers.

=== Yia Xiong protests, February 17 & 19 ===
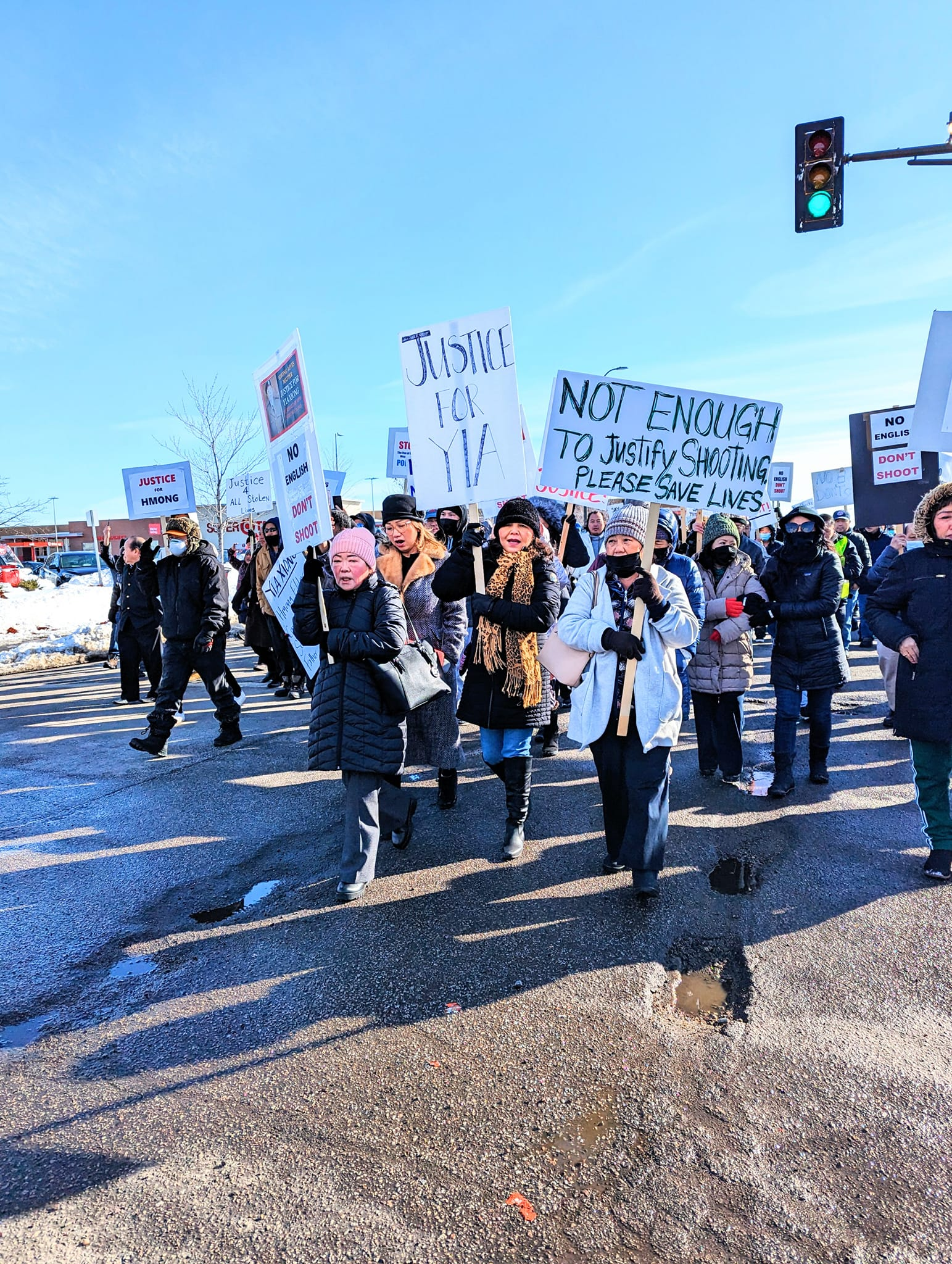
Hundreds of community members, activists, family members, and legislators gathered at the Saint Paul Police Western District office on February 26, 2023 to protest the police killing of Yia Xiong.

On February 12, Saint Paul police responded to calls of a knife-wielding man at an apartment on the 100 block of Western Avenue South. According to police officer accounts and body camera footage, Yia Xiong, a 65-year-old man and veteran of the U.S. Secret War in Vietnam, advanced toward police officers while holding the knife, prompting them to fatally shoot him. The release of body camera footage on February 17 was met with protest by members of Saint Paul's Hmong-American community, including city council member Nelsie Yang, who said Xiong was unnecessarily provoked and that police could have taken other measures to avoid the use of deadly force. Hmong community activists, Black Lives Matter, and Communities United Against Police Brutality held a 100-person protest on February 19 outside the apartment building where Xiong was shot. On February 26, as many as 300 people gathered at the St. Paul Police Western District office to protest and march along University Avenue. Family members believe that Xiong's limited English proficiency and hearing loss contributed to the incident.

=== Tou Thao guilty verdict, May 2 ===
On May 2, 2023, Thao was found guilty of aiding and abetting manslaughter related—the last federal or state criminal court case related to Floyd's murder. The conviction fulfilled a key demand of protesters that all four Minneapolis police officers be held accountable for murdering Floyd.

== See also ==
- COVID-19 protests in the United States § Minnesota
- United States racial unrest (2020–2023)
- History of Minnesota
- Killing of Renée Good
- List of incidents of civil unrest in Minneapolis–Saint Paul
- List of killings by law enforcement officers in Minnesota
