= Long and Kees =

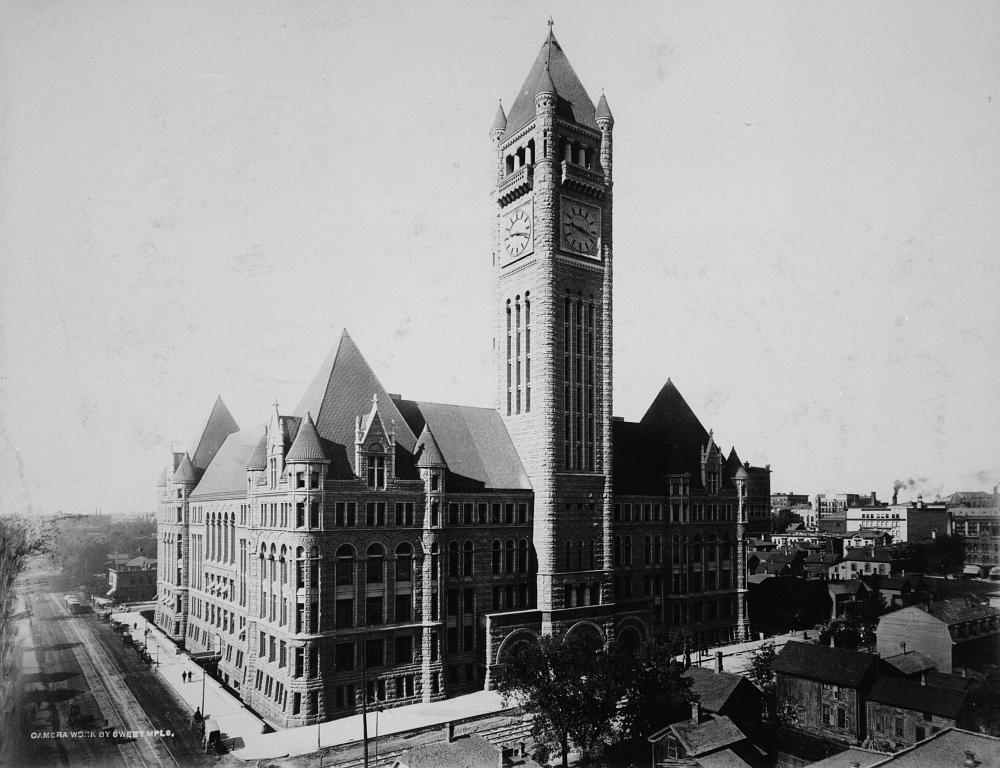
The Minneapolis City Hall building designed by Long and Kees.

Long and Kees was an architecture firm based in Minneapolis, Minnesota active for a twelve-year period starting from 1885 and ending in 1897. Named for its two proprietors, Franklin B. Long (1842–1912) and Frederick Kees (1852-1927), the firm designed several notable churches, offices, schools and houses, including Minneapolis City Hall. Most of the buildings designed by Long and Kees reflect the Richardsonian-Romanesque style.

== History ==
The firm was established in 1885 when Franklin Long, having recently relocated to Minneapolis from Chicago, partnered with Maryland-born Frederick Kees. In later years, Long added his son Louis Long as a partner, as well as Lowell A. Lamoreaux. After Long and Kees disbanded their firm, Kees partnered with Serenus Colburn starting in 1898 and ending in 1921.

== Legacy ==
=== Long and Kees ===
Many of Long and Kees's buildings remain standing today, such as the Lumber Exchange Building (1885), Hennepin Center for the Arts (1888), the Flour Exchange Building (1892), Hawthorn Terrace Apartments (20-26 N. 15th St., 1892), William Nott residence (15 Groveland Terrace, 1892) and Minneapolis City Hall (designed in 1897; completed in 1906). Clayborn Temple in Memphis, Tennessee is also standing.

At the same time, a number of buildings designed by Long and Kees have been demolished, such as the first Minneapolis Public Library (1889), the Minneapolis Corn Exchange, and Donaldson's Glass Block.

=== Long and Long ===
Anne C. and Frank B. Semple House in Minneapolis was designed by Long and Long.

=== Long, Lamoreaux and Long ===
The Lincoln Bank Building, Minneapolis YMCA Central Building, Minnesota Linseed Oil Company, and the east wing of the Minneapolis Grain Exchange in Minneapolis and the Pence Automobile Company Warehouse in Fargo, North Dakota were designed by Long, Lamoreaux and Long, and are listed on the National Register of Historic Places.

=== Franklin Long ===
Franklin Long is credited with the first Farmers and Mechanics Savings Bank building at 115 S. 4th St. in Minneapolis and the Pence Automobile Company Building in Minneapolis.
