= J.I. Case Building =

- U.S. National Register of Historic Places
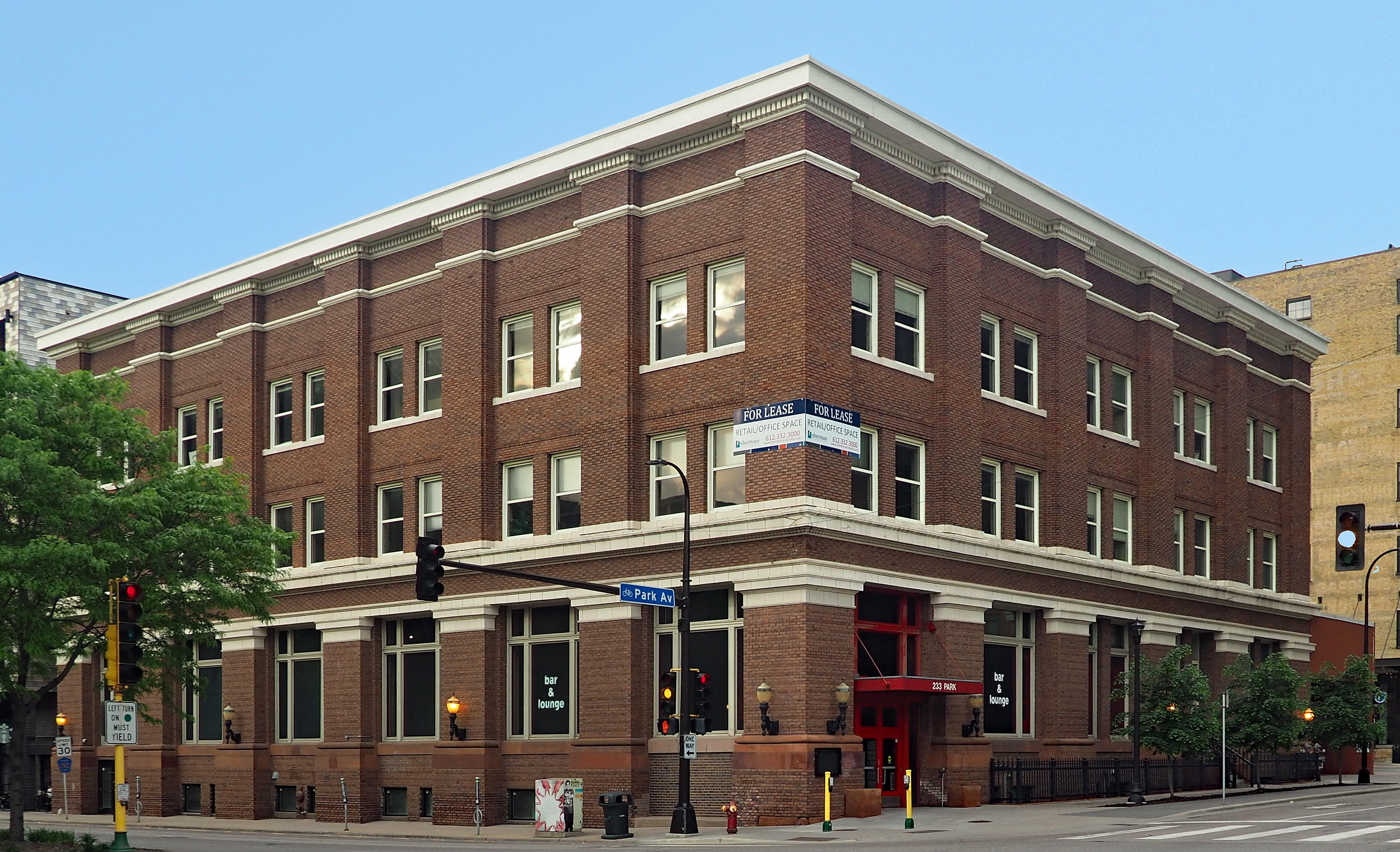

- Location within Minnesota
- Location: 233 Park Ave., Minneapolis, Minnesota
- Coordinates: 44°58′38″N 93°15′31″W
- Area: 0.44 acres (0.18 ha)
- Built: 1907
- Built by: J.L. Robinson
- Architect: Kees and Colburn
- Architectural style: Classical Revival; Late 19th and 20th Century Revivals
- NRHP reference No.: 100006558
- Added to NRHP: May 17, 2021

The J.I. Case Building in downtown Minneapolis, Minnesota was a warehouse and branch headquarters of the J.I. Case Threshing Machine Company. The building was part of a new warehousing development in Minneapolis, because wholesalers were starting to outgrow the warehouse district on the north side of downtown. Former Minneapolis mayor William Henry Eustis was promoting a new warehouse district on the south side of downtown, and had attracted some farm implement companies by the early 1900s. The J.I. Case Building was listed on the National Register of Historic Places in 2021 for its role in commerce and in community planning and development.

Jerome Increase Case founded the J.I. Case Threshing Machine Company in Racine, Wisconsin in 1842. The company acquired a reputation for good customer service and high-quality products. Their products were sold by independent jobbers, as well as a network of company-owned distribution houses known as "branch houses". The J.I. Case Implement Company, a jobber, initially started sales at a warehouse at 308-310 Third Avenue North, in the traditional warehouse district. By 1900, they had expanded their warehouse space, but they needed more space than was available in that district. Minneapolis was becoming a major hub for the distribution of farm machinery, and by 1908 it was the largest distribution point in the world. By 1915, the dollar volume of farm implements sold in Minneapolis exceeded the dollar volume of the flour and grain trade.

William Henry Eustis was promoting a new warehouse district on the south side of downtown, but there were some seedy elements in that part of town. An alley south of Washington Avenue between Park and Chicago Avenues was known as "Fish Alley", because a fish market had previously been located there. It was surrounded by overcrowded apartment buildings and was known for drinking parties and fights. Residents were warned, "It isn’t safe to go into the alley, unless you have a gun and policeman with you, and then you are not safe." There was also a dance hall and four saloons facing Washington Avenue on the block. By 1906, only one saloon remained, as a result of an effort to clean up the area, and fighting was reduced, but Fish Alley was still known for criminals and loose women. Some redevelopment was occurring in the area, though. The Great Northern Implement Company (also known as the Pittsburgh Plate Glass Company Building) built a location west of Park Avenue on Third Street. Advance Thresher built an architecturally distinguished structure on the east side of Park Avenue at Third Street, and Emerson-Newton Implement Company built a building immediately adjacent to Advance-Thresher.

In the spring of 1903, Case purchased several properties on Washington Avenue between Park and Chicago Avenues. By September 1903, Case applied for a building permit for a "large $125,000 building". Construction did not begin immediately, though, because the company was preoccupied with a warehouse fire that destroyed 110 threshing machines, a new headquarters building in Racine, and a new thresher made entirely of steel. By September 1906, the company was finally ready to build, so they applied for a building permit for a brick warehouse with three stories and a basement, 70 feet (21 m) tall and measuring 115 feet (35 m) by 132 feet (40 m) with an estimated cost of $50,000. They selected the firm of Kees and Colburn, who had designed the Advance-Thresher and Emerson-Newton buildings on the same block. The building was completed by October 1907.

By the late 1950s, farming was facing a change. 850,000 farms had been lost between 1954 and 1959, and other farmers bought out the land of those farms that folded. With fewer farmers and larger farms, the sales of agricultural implements had dropped 25 percent by 1960. Downtown Minneapolis was also changing, with more traffic and older buildings that had accumulated deferred maintenance during the Great Depression and World War II. In 1959, Case moved its branch office to a building on Minnesota State Highway 55 in Eagan, Minnesota. The downtown Minneapolis building became a warehouse for Minneapolis House Furnishings. In the early 1990s, the building was remodeled to house offices and a restaurant, the Old Spaghetti Factory, which opened in 1994. The Old Spaghetti Factory closed in 2019.
