= Lumber Exchange Building (disambiguation) =

The Lumber Exchange Building is in Minneapolis, Minnesota, listed on the NRHP in Hennepin County, Minnesota.

Lumber Exchange Building may also refer to:

- Lumber Exchange Building (South Bend, Washington), listed on the National Register of Historic Places in Pacific County, Washington
- Lumber Exchange Building in Seattle, designed by Saunders and Lawton
- Roanoke Building, Chicago, Illinois, listed on the NRHP as the Lumber Exchange Building and Tower Addition
- Grain and Lumber Exchange Building, Winona, Minnesota
