= Louis Long =

Louis Long may refer to:

- Louis L. Long (Maryland architect) (fl. 1853–1860), American architect of Baltimore, Maryland
- Louis L. Long (Minnesota architect) (c. 1870–1925), partner in Long, Lamoreaux & Long
- Louis Long, stage name for American professional wrestler The Silent Warrior

== See also ==
- Lewis M. Long, American politician
