= Frederick Kees =

American architect (1852–1927)

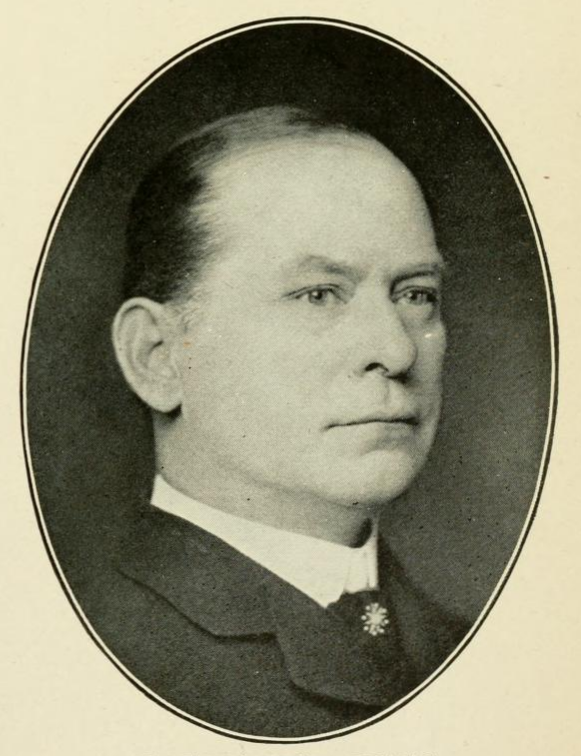
Kees in an image published 1902

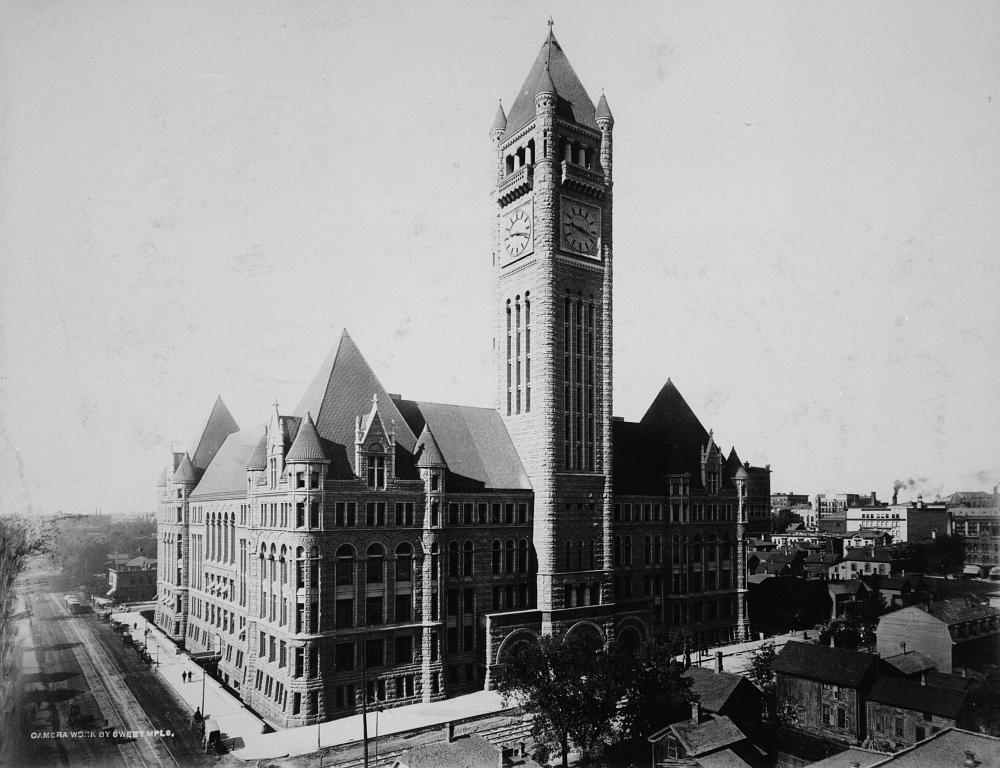
Historic Minneapolis City Hall designed by the firm Long and Kees (photo circa 1900)

Frederick G. Kees (April 9, 1852 – March 16, 1927) was an American architect notable for his work in Minnesota and partnerships with Franklin B. Long and Serenus Colburn.

== Life and career ==
Kees was born in Baltimore, Maryland on April 9, 1852. He joined the firm of E. G. Lind as an apprentice in 1865 and worked at the firm until 1878. He moved to Minneapolis, Minnesota in 1878 and briefly worked with Leroy Buffington. He also partnered with Burnham W. Fisk for a few years under the name "Kees and Fisk". In 1885, Kees partnered with Franklin B. Long to form the architectural firm Long and Kees. After designing more than 13 buildings (including the Minneapolis City Hall), Kees ended the partnership. He then went on to partner with Serenus Colburn to create the firm Kees and Colburn which survived until 1925, the year of Colburn's death. Kees died two years later, on March 16, 1927. He was buried in Lakewood Cemetery.

Kees is considered to be one of Minneapolis’ foremost architects by the Minneapolis Heritage and Preservation Commission.

== Notable and historically significant works by Fredrick G. Kees ==
Through the firm of Kees and Fisk:

- Comstock House, Moorhead, Minnesota
- First Baptist Church, Minneapolis
- Syndicate Block (later J.C. Penney), Minneapolis
- Grand Opera House, Minneapolis.
- James Clark residence, Minneapolis.

Through the firm of Long and Kees:

- Minneapolis City Hall, Minneapolis
- The Masonic Temple (currently the Hennepin Center for the Arts), Minneapolis
- The Flour Exchange Building, Minneapolis

Through the firm of Kees and Colburn:

- Psi Upsilon fraternity, Mu Chapterhouse, Minneapolis
- Minneapolis Grain Exchange building (originally Minneapolis Chamber of Commerce), Minneapolis
- Northern Implement Company building, Minneapolis
- Advance Thresher/Emerson-Newton Implement Company building, Minneapolis.
- Chamber of Commerce Building, Minneapolis
- Grain and Lumber Exchange Building, Winona, Minnesota
- Great Northern Implement Company, Minneapolis
- Jacob Leuthold Jr. House, Kasson, Minnesota
- Little Sisters of the Poor Home for the Aged, Minneapolis
