= Lincoln Bank Building =

- U.S. National Register of Historic Places
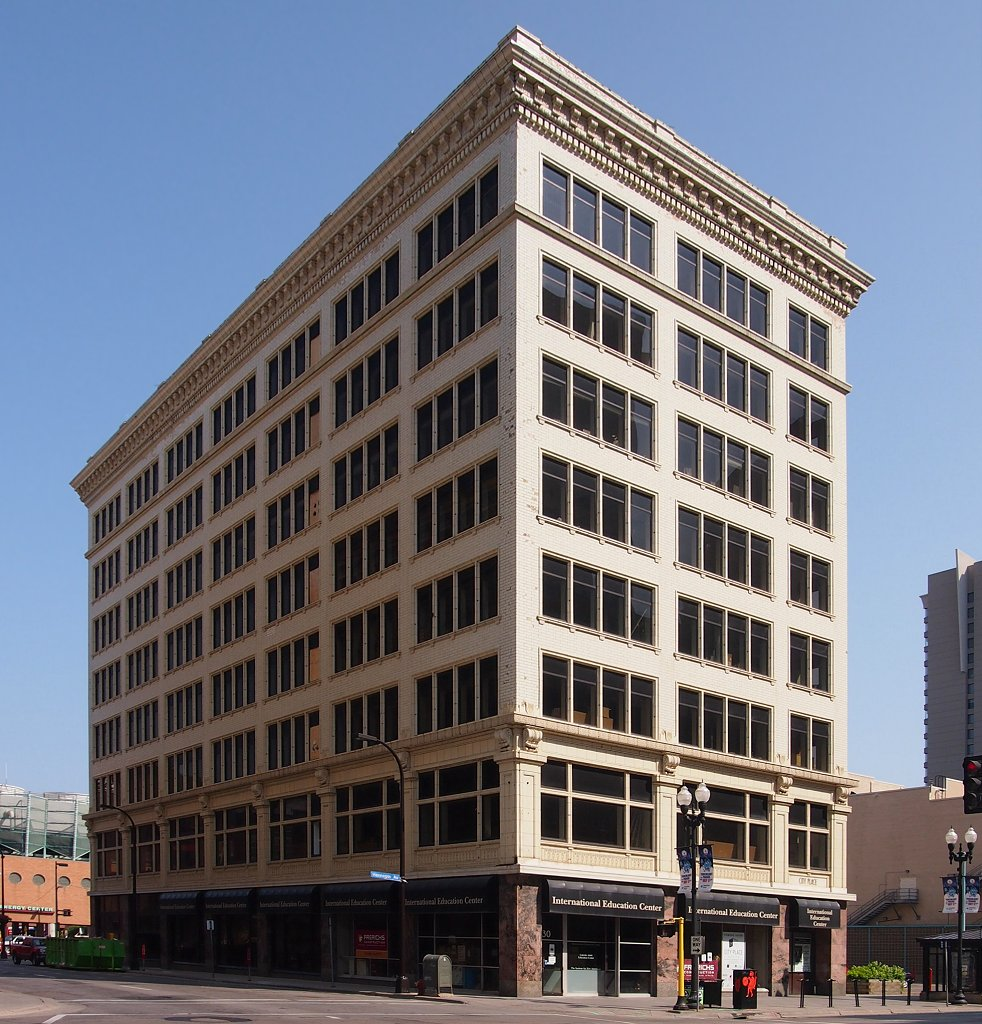
- The Lincoln Bank Building from the south

- Location within Minnesota Location within the United States
- Location: 730 Hennepin Avenue, Minneapolis, Minnesota
- Coordinates: 44°58′38″N 93°16′33″W
- Area: 0.2 acres (0.081 ha)
- Built: 1921
- Architect: Long, Lamoreaux and Long
- Architectural style: Commercial Style
- NRHP reference No.: 12000846
- Added to NRHP: October 15, 2012

The Lincoln Bank Building is a building on Hennepin Avenue in downtown Minneapolis, Minnesota, United States. The building was listed on the National Register of Historic Places in October 2012.

== Background ==
Lincoln National Bank was established in 1917 by Harry Pence, a local automobile magnate, and a number of other backers. They had planned to name it the "Second National Bank", but the Treasury Department refused that name since they were not actually the second bank organized. Pence adopted the name of Abraham Lincoln because, "it carries with it his well-known characteristics of strength, ability, fidelity, firmness, faithfulness, loyalty, conservatism, etc., attributes very desirable in a national bank."

== Locations ==
The bank's location was chosen to provide service to the automobile trade and similar businesses along Hennepin Avenue at the time, along with the nearby warehouse district and the markets along Second Avenue North. The established financial district in Minneapolis was along Marquette Avenue, two blocks to the east, but Pence saw the value in providing a bank with its mission "to take care of the automobile business and, in general, to serve downtown Hennepin Avenue business interests."

The original home for the bank was at 809 Hennepin Avenue, but the bank's business grew so well that larger quarters were needed. Lincoln National Bank had also established an affiliate, Lincoln Trust and Savings Bank. In 1919, Harry Pence announced plans to build a new bank building at 730 Hennepin Avenue, directly across 8th Street from his Pence Automobile Company Building. The new building was designed by Long, Lamoreaux & Long, the same architects as the earlier building, and was completed for a cost of about $1 million. The eight-story building opened on August 9, 1921, and housed both the Lincoln National Bank and the Lincoln Trust and Savings Bank. The seven upper floors of the building were leased out for offices.

== Branch offices ==
In 1921, Daniel Richard Crissinger was appointed as the Comptroller of the Currency and shifted the regulatory stance on national banks. Previous comptrollers did not allow national banks to establish branch offices, but the new comptroller decided that, "there was no restriction on the number of branch offices a bank could establish as long as they were within the city limits mentioned in its charter." As a result, the two largest banks, Northwestern National Bank (now Wells Fargo) and First National Bank (now U.S. Bank) started acquiring smaller banks and turning them into branch offices.

The Lincoln National Bank and Lincoln Trust and Savings Bank were acquired by Northwestern National Bank, in a move that promised customers business "as usual and with practically the same people, but with the added advantages of doing business with the Northwestern National Bank and its entire facilities, both as to domestic and foreign business."

== Residential conversion ==
In 2013, the Lincoln Bank Building was approved for the residential development of its top seven floors.
