= Little Sisters of the Poor Home for the Aged (Minneapolis, Minnesota) =

- U.S. National Register of Historic Places
- Minneapolis Landmark
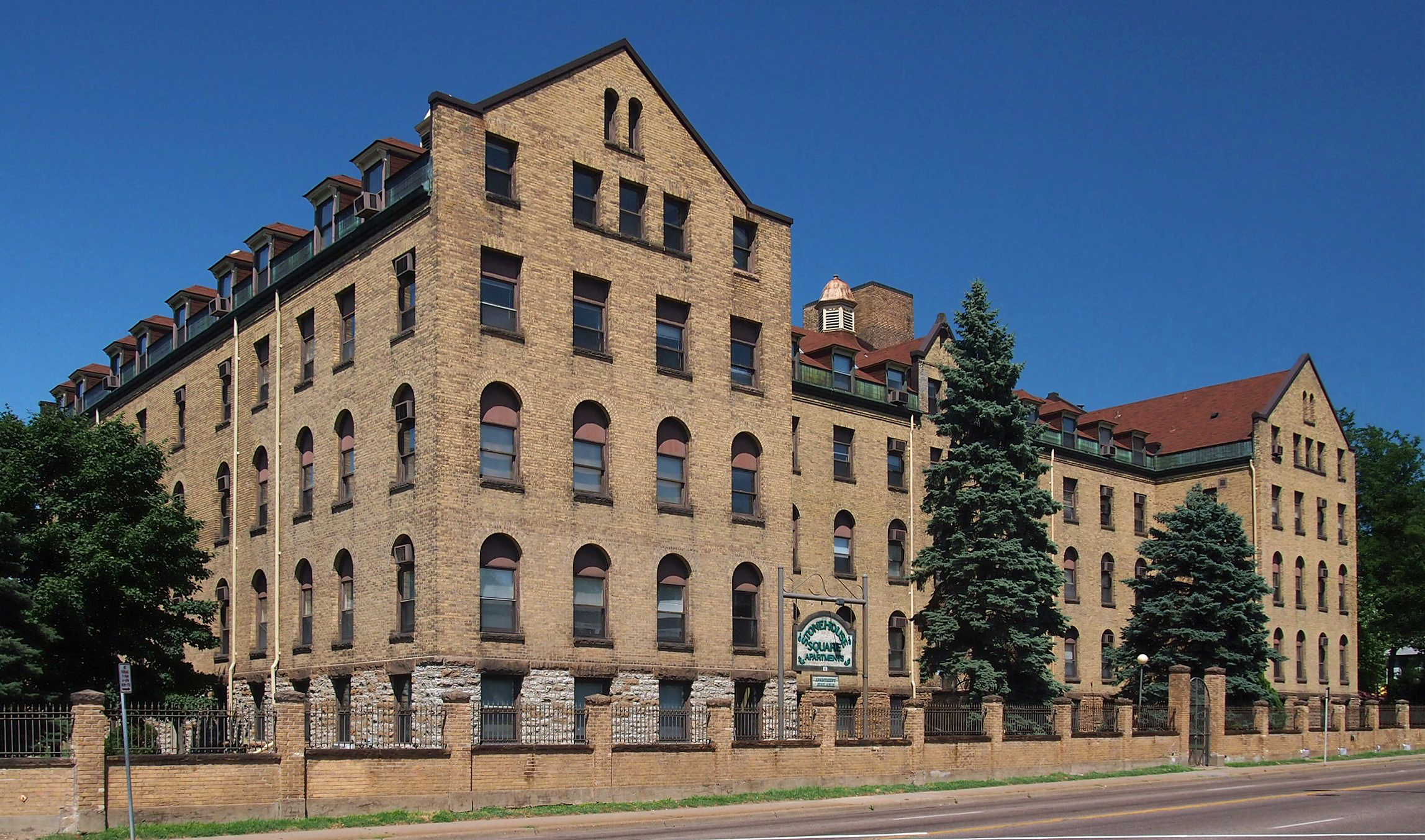
- Little Sisters of the Poor Home for the Aged from the southwest

- Location within Minnesota Location within the United States
- Location: Minneapolis, Minnesota
- Coordinates: 44°59′56″N 93°15′55″W
- Built: 1895
- Architect: Frederick Corser; Kees & Colburn
- NRHP reference No.: 78001540

Significant dates
- Added to NRHP: September 21, 1978
- Designated MPLSL: 1979

The Little Sisters of the Poor Home for the Aged is a building in northeast Minneapolis, Minnesota, United States, built by a charitable organization, the Little Sisters of the Poor. They came to Minneapolis in 1889 to build a home for the aged. Architect Frederick Corser designed the first part of the building in 1895, consisting of a 3 1/2-story building with an attached chapel. Corser's design was based more on its scale and proportion than on its ornamentation.

The home needed more space, so in 1905 Corser designed an east wing of the structure, following the original design principles. In 1914 still more space was added in a west wing, this time designed by Frederick Kees and Serenus Colburn, but following the same design. The Sisters and their patients later moved in 1977 to a new building in Saint Paul. The old building, on Broadway Street Northeast between Second and Third Avenues, was renovated into a 71-unit apartment complex. It was listed on the National Register of Historic Places in 1978.
