= Farmers and Mechanics Savings Bank (1891) =

- U.S. National Register of Historic Places
- Minneapolis Landmark
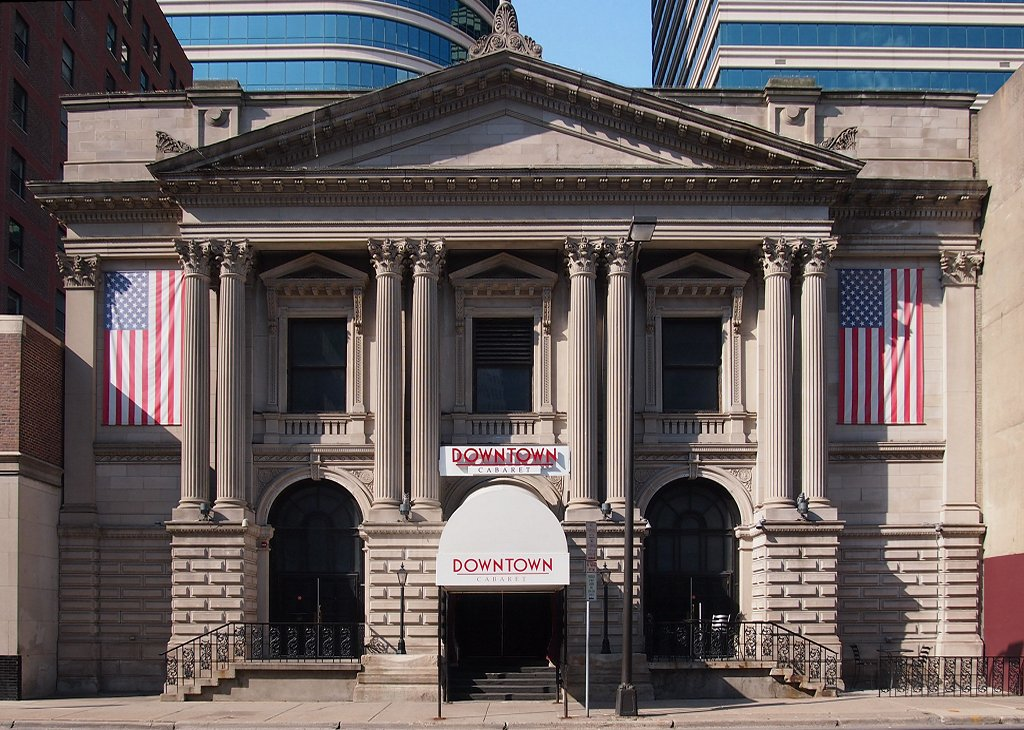
- The Farmers and Mechanics Savings Bank from the northeast

- Location within Minnesota Location within the United States
- Location: Minneapolis, Minnesota
- Coordinates: 44°58′43.26″N 93°16′3.39″W
- Built: 1891
- Architect: Franklin B. Long; William Kenyon
- Architectural style: Classical Revival, Beaux-Arts
- NRHP reference No.: 84001419

Significant dates
- Added to NRHP: January 12, 1984
- Designated MPLSL: 1980

The 1891 Farmers and Mechanics Savings Bank building in Minneapolis, Minnesota, United States, is a Beaux-Arts style building that formerly served as the headquarters of Farmers and Mechanics Savings Bank. The building is now home to The Downtown Cabaret, a strip club. Architecture critic Larry Millett writes, "If you step inside for a view of the, ahem, scenery, you'll discover a glass dome that once illuminated a 'ladies banking lobby' but is now the scene of activities not everyone would consider ladylike."

The building was designed by the locally prominent firm of Long and Kees as a one-story building. Long and Kees usually preferred the then-popular Richardsonian Romanesque style for their buildings, but deviated from this style for the bank. In 1908 architect William Kenyon designed a second-story addition that enlarged the façade while retaining the Beaux-Arts style. The exterior is faced with white limestone, with five piers of rusticated stone supporting fluted Corinthian pilasters. In 1942, the bank moved to a new location at 88 S. 6th St. at the corner of Sixth and Marquette. The building was listed on the National Register of Historic Places in 1984.

== See also ==
- List of strip clubs
