= Flour Exchange Building =

- U.S. National Register of Historic Places
- Minneapolis Landmark
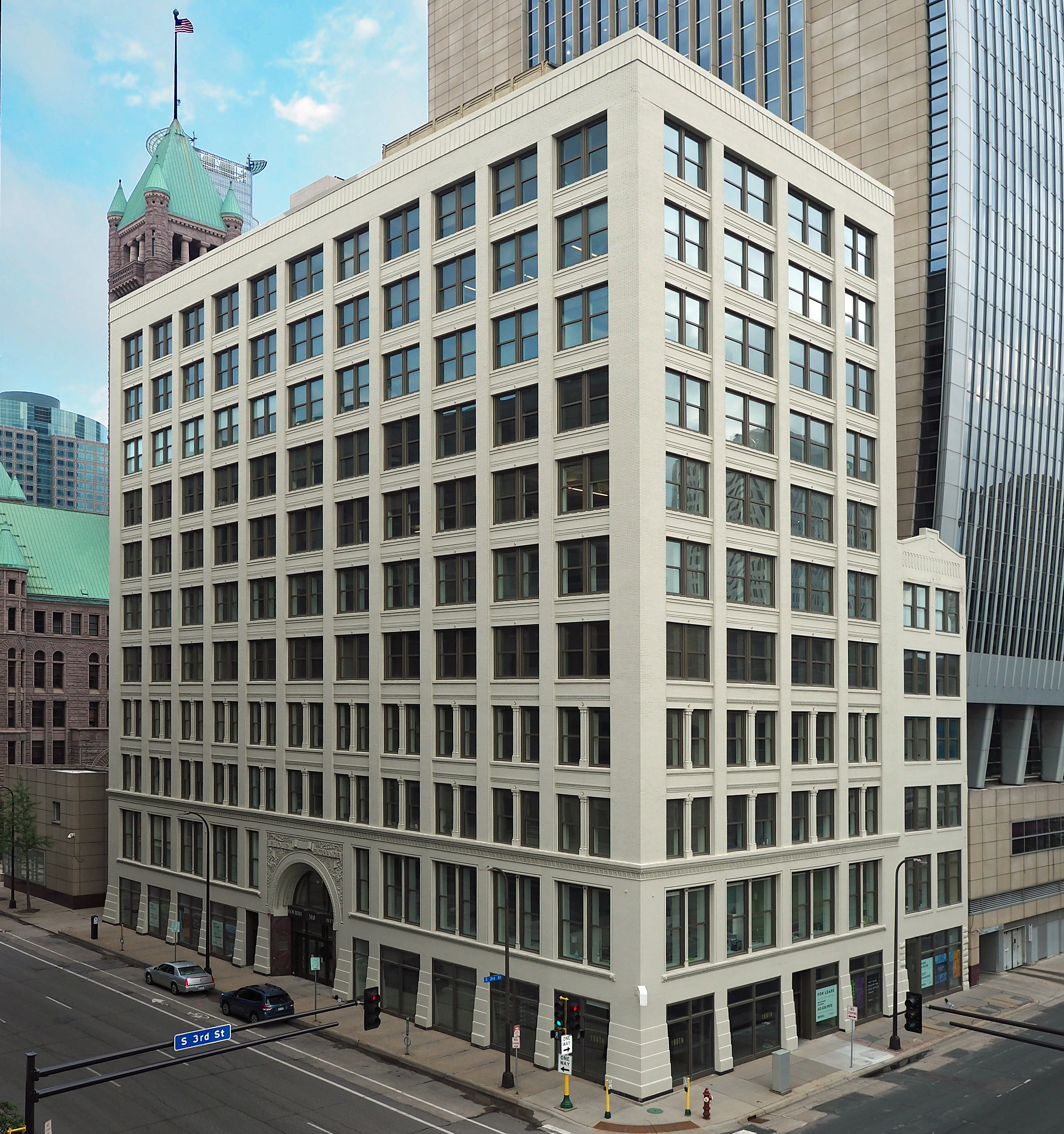
- The Flour Exchange Building from the west

- Location within Minnesota Location within the United States
- Location: 310 4th Avenue South, Minneapolis, Minnesota
- Coordinates: 44°58′42″N 93°15′50″W
- Built: 1892/1909
- Architect: Long and Kees
- Architectural style: Chicago School
- NRHP reference No.: 77000740

Significant dates
- Added to NRHP: August 29, 1977
- Designated MPLSL: 1980

The Flour Exchange Building is an office building in downtown Minneapolis, Minnesota, United States, designed by architects Long and Kees, who also designed Minneapolis City Hall and the Lumber Exchange Building. Construction originally began in 1892, but halted abruptly in 1893 after only four floors had been built. This was due to the effects of the Panic of 1893. Construction resumed later, and the building was completed in 1909 with eleven stories. The building is generally in the Chicago school, using a relatively straightforward approach without a lot of historic details. The modern influence of this style later influenced the Butler Square building. The building was listed on the National Register of Historic Places in 1977.
