= Farmers and Mechanics Savings Bank (1942) =

- U.S. National Register of Historic Places
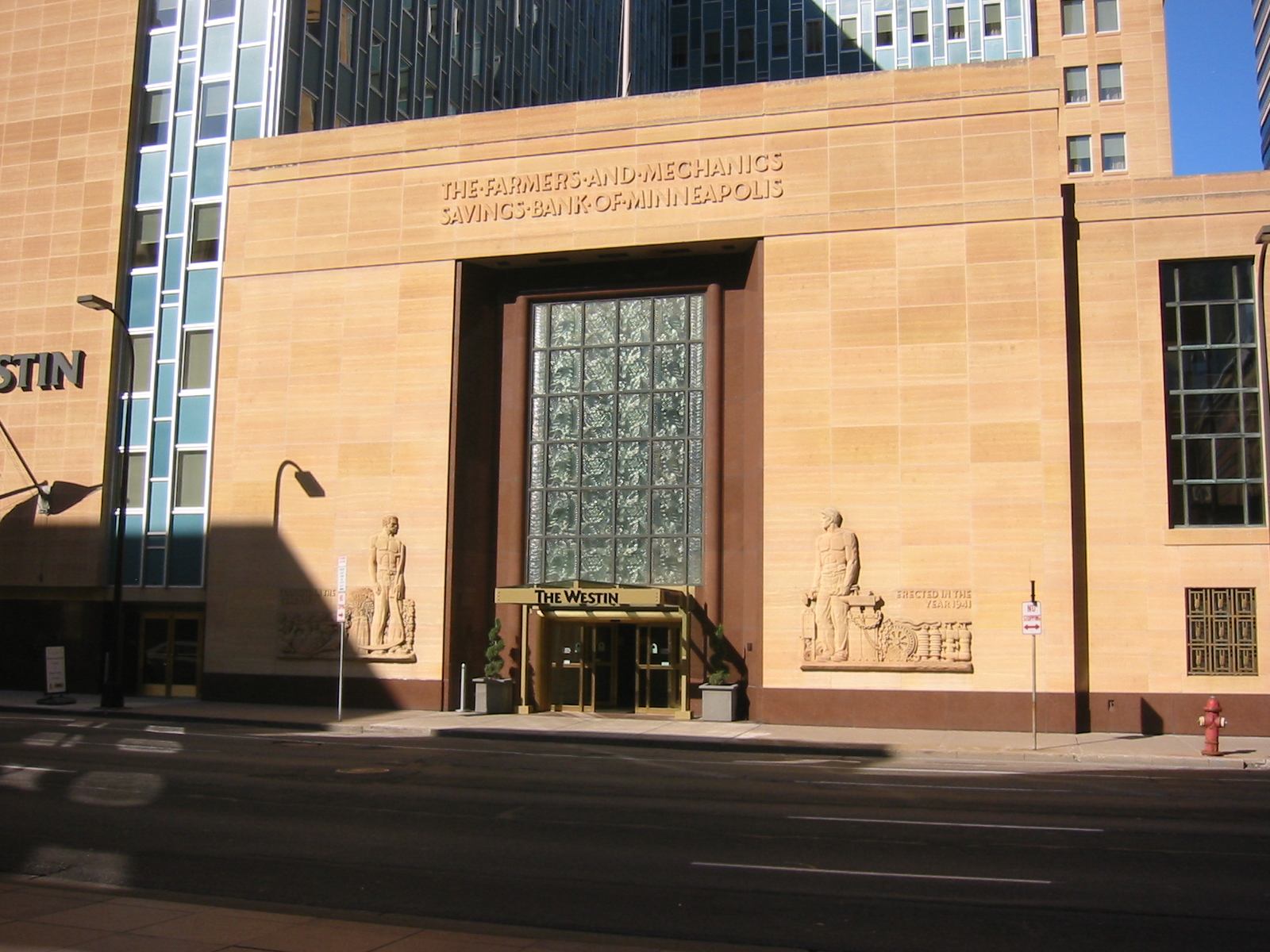
- The main entrance of the Farmers and Mechanics Savings Bank in Minneapolis, complete with sculptures of a farmer and a mechanic on either side of the door.
- Location: Minneapolis, MN
- Coordinates: 44°58′39.35″N 93°16′11.59″W
- Built: 1942
- Architect: McEnary & Krafft
- Architectural style: Moderne, International Style
- NRHP reference No.: 06000094
- Added to NRHP: March 2, 2006

The 1942 Farmers and Mechanics Savings Bank building in downtown Minneapolis, Minnesota, United States is a former bank building that is now the home of a Westin Hotel. The building is an example of the Streamline Moderne phase of the Art Deco movement and is notable for its bold relief sculptures of a farmer and a mechanic framing the main entrance. The sculptures were designed by Warren T. Mosman, who headed the sculpture department at the Minneapolis Institute of Arts. The structure was listed on the National Register of Historic Places in 2006.

The previous Farmers and Mechanics Savings Bank headquarters was built in 1891 on 115 S. 4th St. It is now home to The Downtown Cabaret.

== Architecture and Design ==
Exterior

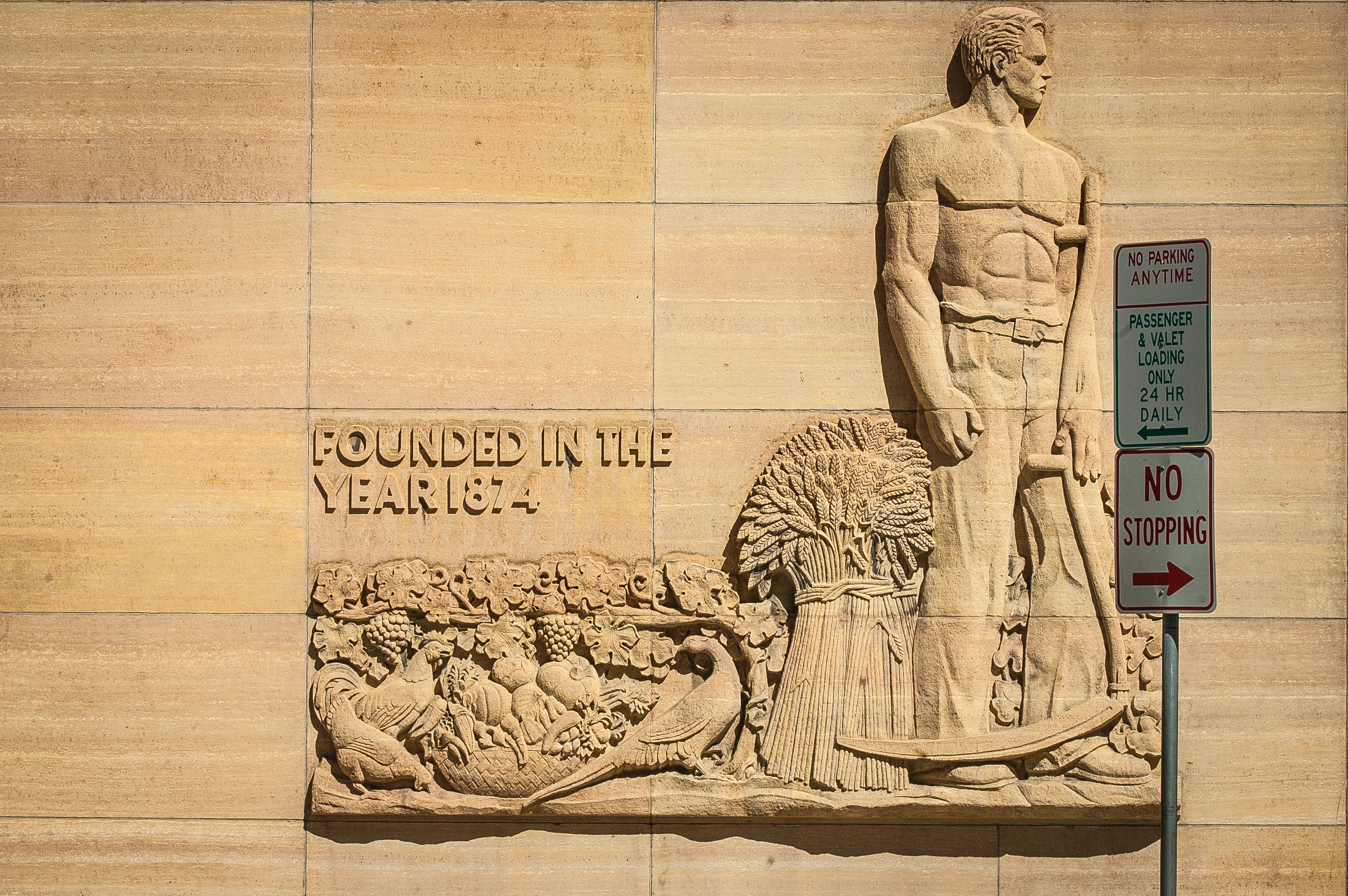
Farmer sculpture, left of the main entrance

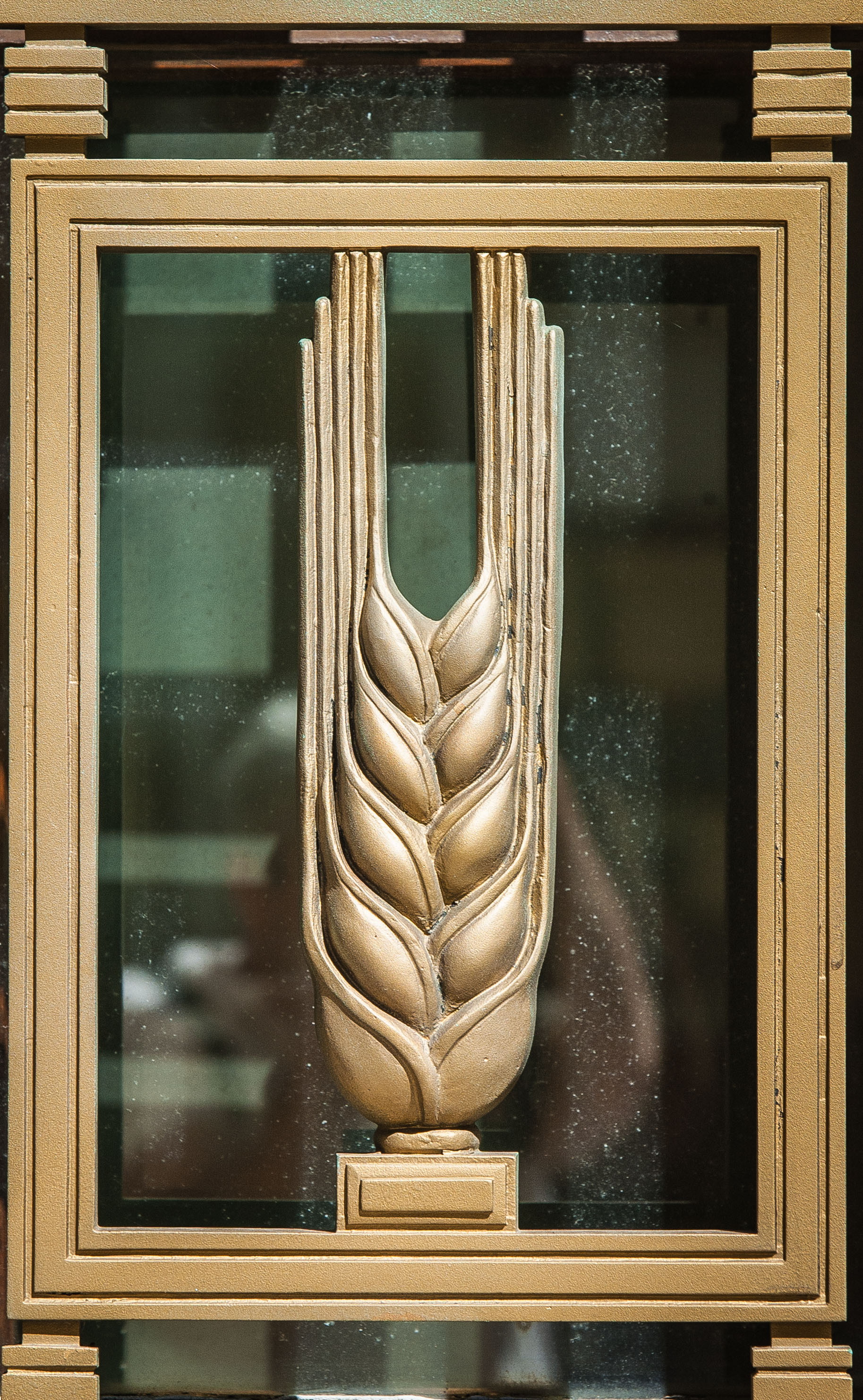
Abstracted wheat mullion

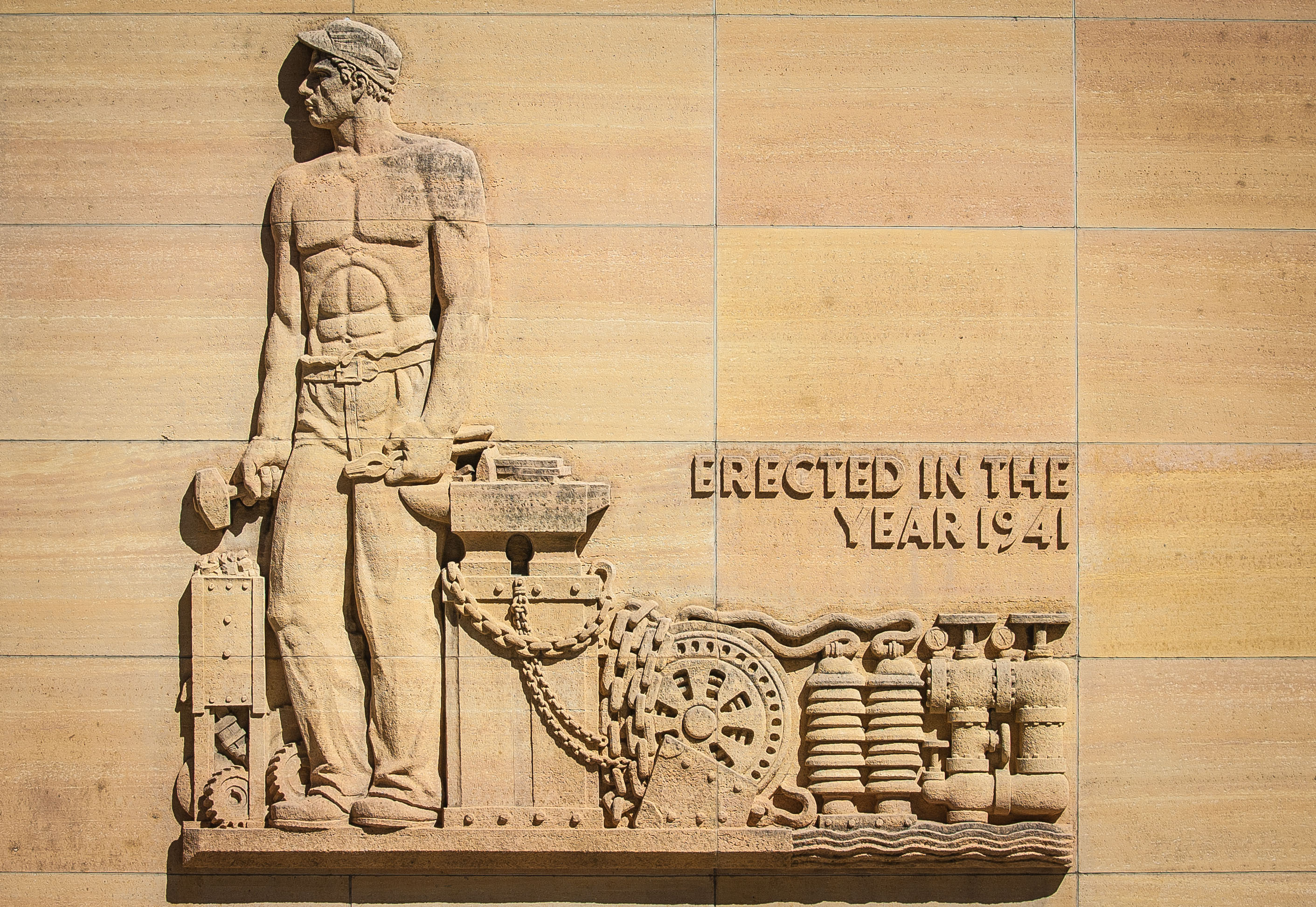
Mechanic sculpture, right of the main entrance

Situated on the northwestern corner of 6th Street and Marquette Avenue, the exterior is constructed of Kasota limestone. Its main entrance along the southern facade is flanked by two reliefs: a farmer standing amidst crops and livestock on the left, and a mechanic holding a hammer next to an anvil on the right. The longer eastern facade is etched with a carving of a dog with the label of Fides — a Roman phrase and goddess of trust and good faith.

Visible throughout the exterior are window mullions decorated with abstractions of wheat.

Interior

The most architecturally significant space is the building’s teak-paneled main banking hall, now an on-site restaurant called Stock & Bond. The restaurant has preserved many of the hall’s original features, including its granite floors, carved walnut emblems, and six gilded, lotus flower chandeliers adorning the 34-foot (10 m) high ceiling. A 2025 renovation by Wilson Ishihara Design saw the instillation of a new mural on the hall’s ceiling by Aaron Petz. His Art Deco design features a banker holding a pen next to a merchant in overalls — an homage to the history of the building. Former offices now serve as private dining rooms, and the bar occupies the space originally held by the teller counter.

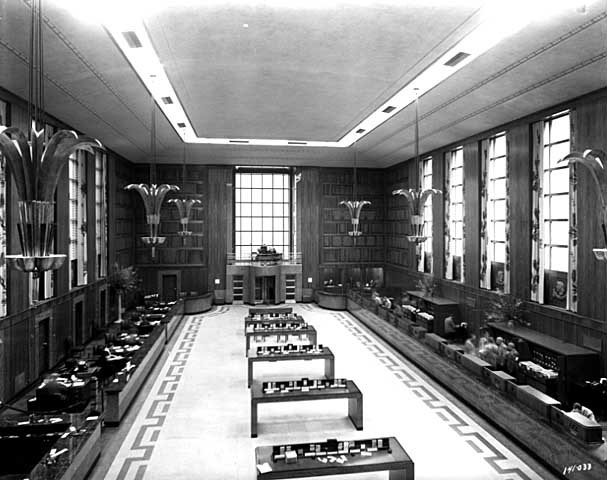
Original banking hall

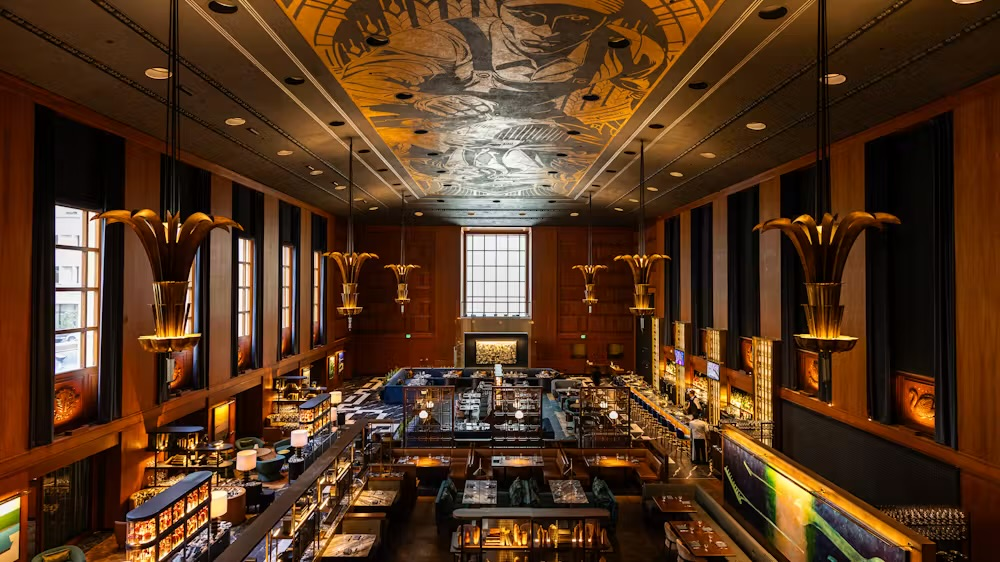
Current banking hall (2025)

The original bank vault on the lower level is now a conference room, while the former safety deposit vault was converted into a wine vault.

Tower Addition

Originally housing additional offices, the building’s eleven-story tower was constructed in 1963 and contains the hotel’s 214 rooms. It is clad in windows and the same Kasota limestone. The bank's boardroom on the 10th floor, with floor-to-ceiling windows, is now a conference room.
