= Frederick Corser =

American architect (1849–1924)

Frederick Gardner Corser
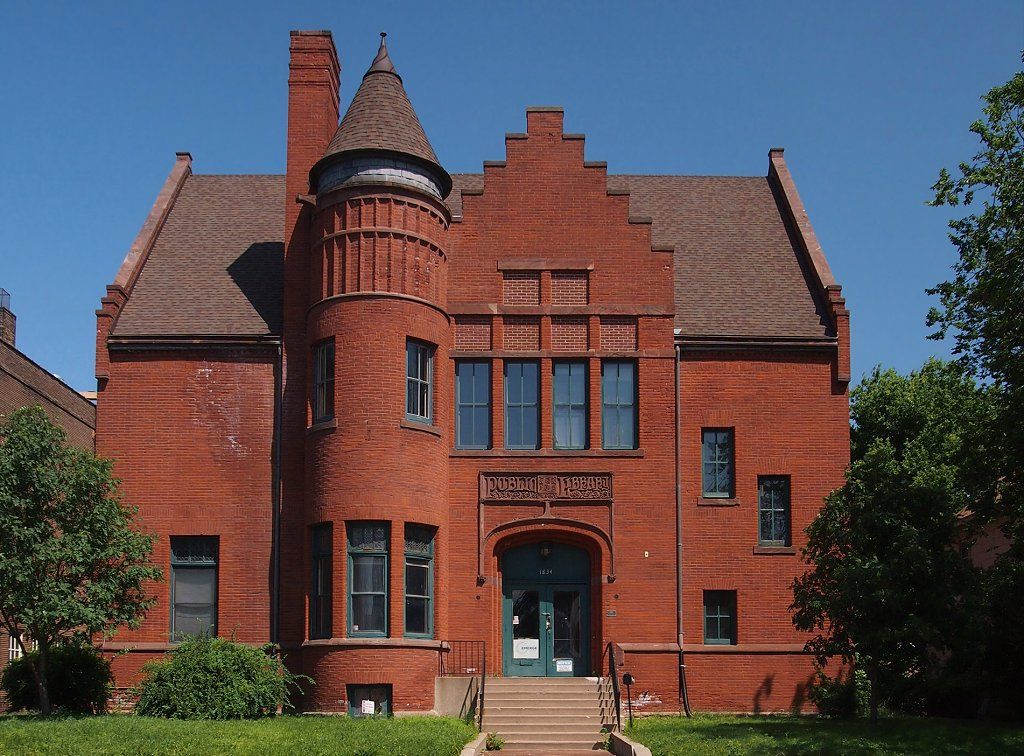
- Minneapolis Public Library, North Branch
- Born: June 12, 1849; Rochester, New York
- Died: September 3, 1924 (aged 75); Minneapolis, Minnesota
- Occupation: Architect
- Buildings: Church of St. Stephen (Minneapolis) and Wesbrook Hall, University of Minnesota

Frederick Gardner Corser (June 12, 1849 – September 3, 1924) was an American architect of homes and public buildings in the U.S. states of Minnesota, North Dakota, and South Dakota, especially in the Minneapolis, Minnesota area.

He studied architecture at Massachusetts Institute of Technology. Corser "served as the editor of Western Architect (1902-1905), as architect for the Minneapolis Fire Department for an unspecified period of time, and was a charter member of the Western Association of Architects (1884), a forerunner of the state AIA organization."

He died at his home in Minneapolis on September 3, 1924.

Buildings that he designed include:

- Church of St. Stephen, 1888-1889 (built in 1891), Minneapolis
- Wesbrook Hall, University of Minnesota, 1895–1896, Minneapolis
- Little Sisters of the Poor Home for the Aged, 1895, Minneapolis
- Minneapolis Public Library, North Branch
- Kenneseth Israel Synagogue, Minneapolis
- Frank Griswold residence, ca. 1885, Minneapolis,
- Fargo Central High School, 1882, Fargo, North Dakota
- Emerson Cole residence

The first four are buildings listed on the National Register of Historic Places. The Griswold residence, on Nicollet Island, is part of the Saint Anthony Falls Historic District on the National Register.
