= Minneapolis Public Library, North Branch =

- U.S. National Register of Historic Places
- Minneapolis Landmark
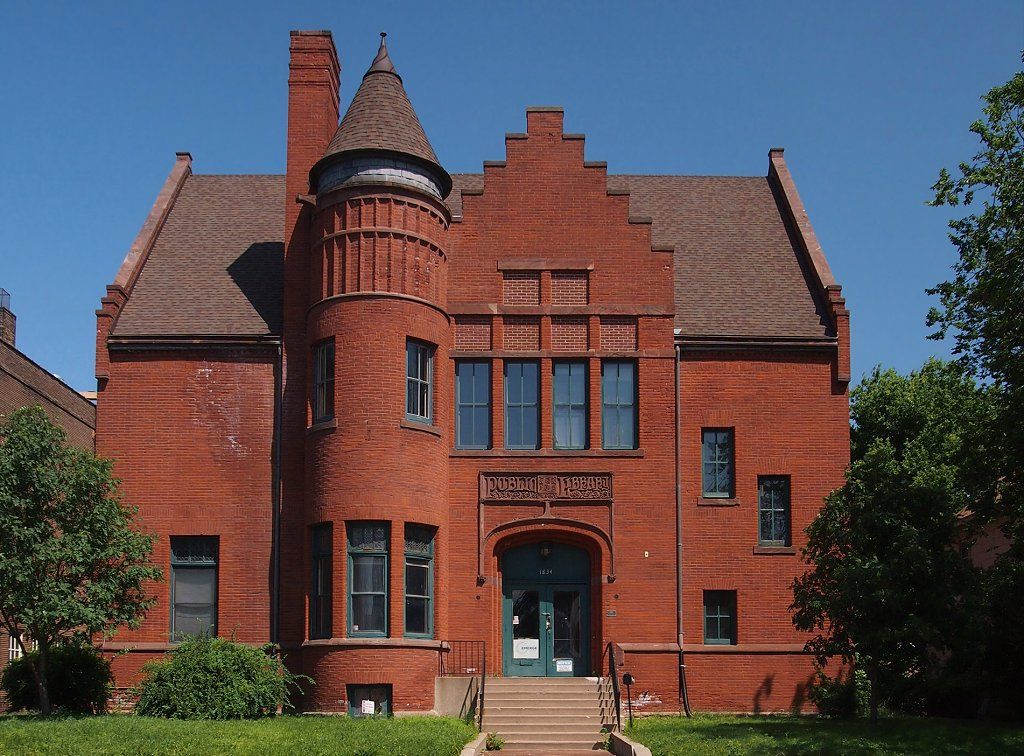
- The former North Branch Library from the west

- Location within Minnesota Location within the United States
- Location: 1834 Emerson Avenue North; Minneapolis, Minnesota
- Coordinates: 44°59′54″N 93°17′36″W
- Built: 1893
- Architect: Frederick Corser; H.N. Leighton Co.
- Architectural style: Late 19th And 20th Century Revivals
- NRHP reference No.: 77000743

Significant dates
- Added to NRHP: December 7, 1977
- Designated MPLSL: 1984

The Minneapolis Public Library, North Branch building is a former library in Minneapolis, Minnesota, United States. It was designed in 1893 by architect Frederick Corser. When it was opened, it was claimed to be the nation's first branch library to have open shelves so patrons could browse for books on their own, without asking librarians to retrieve them. The library set a precedent for future library development in the Minneapolis Public Library system.

The building has a slender tower, a stepped front gable, and an arched entrance shaped like a basket handle, roughly fitting into the Chateauesque style. It includes terra cotta ornamentation and sculptured stonework. It was listed on the National Register of Historic Places in 1977, and is the Twin Cities' oldest surviving public library building.

It was replaced in 1971 by the North Regional Community Library at 1315 Lowry Avenue North, and officially closed in 1977. The Minneapolis Library Board voted to give the building and land to the Minneapolis Housing and Redevelopment Authority (HRA) via a quit claim deed on December 15, 1977.

As of October 2014, the library building is being renovated by EMERGE Community Development. This renovation has stayed consistent with requirements to keep both the interior and exterior of the building on the historic register. The building will reopen in December 2014 as the EMERGE Career and Technology Center. Starting in January 2015 it will house an open access computer lab for North Minneapolis residents, a computer-based classroom environment for teaching computer classes, a lab space for Hennepin Technical College manufacturing students, community and event space, EMERGE's administrative staff, EMERGE's youth program, EMERGE's training program and EMERGE's financial education classes. The EMERGE Career and Technology Center (ECTC) will bring training for in-demand careers to North Minneapolis.
