= Anne C. and Frank B. Semple House =

Historic house in Minnesota, United States

- U.S. National Register of Historic Places
- Minneapolis Landmark
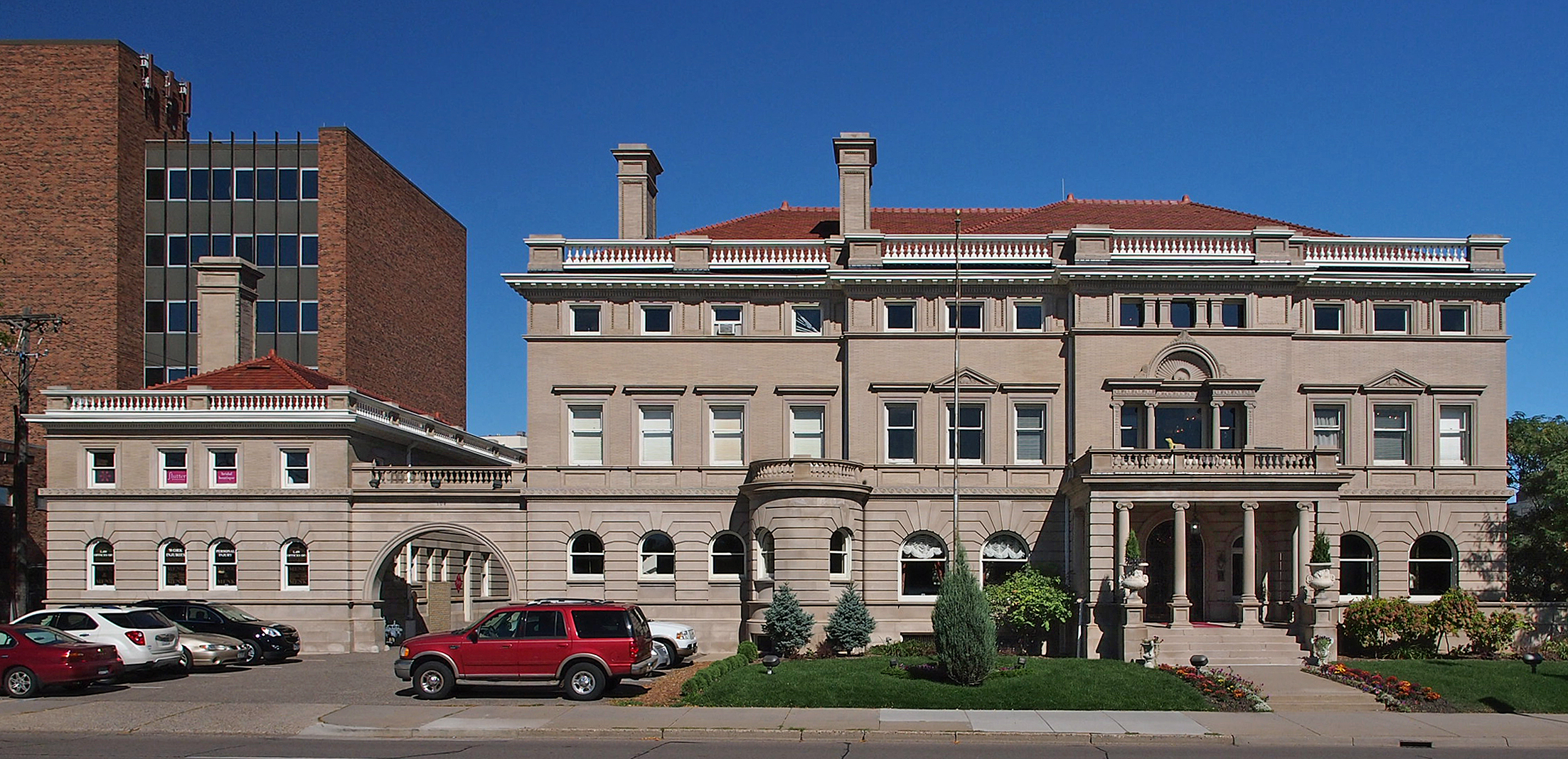
- The Semple House from the south

- Location within Minnesota Location within the United States
- Location: 100 West Franklin Avenue, Minneapolis, Minnesota
- Coordinates: 44°57′47″N 93°16′46″W
- Built: 1899–1901
- Architect: Franklin B. Long; Louis Long
- Architectural style: Renaissance Revival
- NRHP reference No.: 98000151

Significant dates
- Added to NRHP: February 26, 1998
- Designated MPLSL: 2006

The Anne C. and Frank B. Semple House is a historic house in the Stevens Square/Loring Heights neighborhood of Minneapolis, Minnesota, United States. It is located on the same block as the George R. Newell House and the George W. and Nancy B. Van Dusen House. The house was listed on the National Register of Historic Places in 1998.

The house was built in the Beaux-Arts architectural style, reflecting a shift in style toward the classicism of the Renaissance and away from Victorian ideals. Its first owner, Frank Semple, was a partner in Janney, Semple, and Co., a wholesale hardware firm. The entry on Franklin Avenue has a balustraded entry porch with Ionic columns, a detailed Palladian window, and a rounded bay. The interior has a reception hall with mahogany paneling, a hardwood floor with marble inlays, and a frescoed ceiling. Interior spaces include a 1,000-square-foot (93 m^{2}) living room and a ballroom.

The mansion is now available as a reception site for weddings and other events.
