= Church of Saint Stephen (Minneapolis, Minnesota) =

Historic church in Minnesota, United States

- U.S. National Register of Historic Places
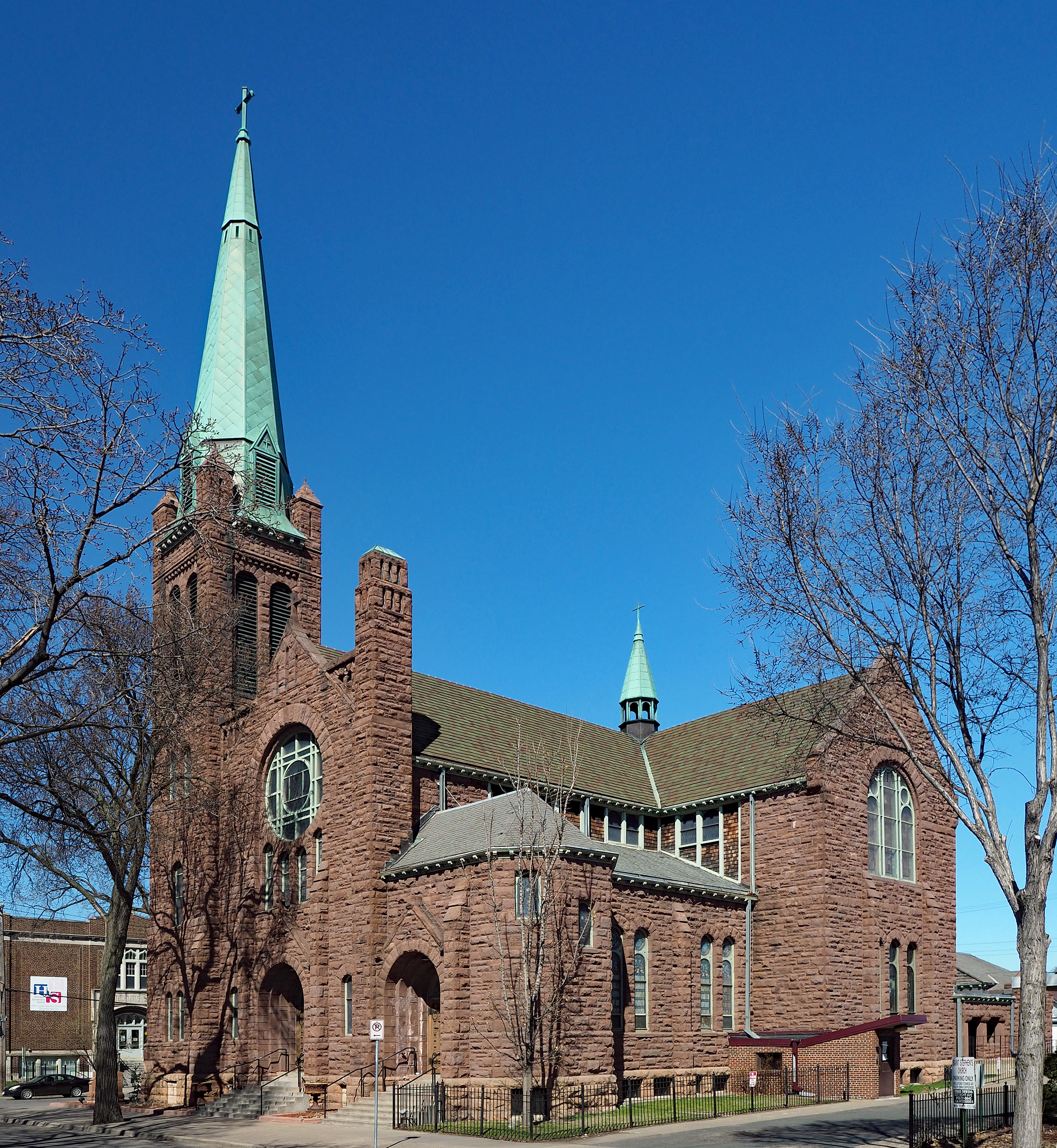
- The Church of Saint Stephen from the southwest

- Location within Minnesota Location within the United States
- Location: 2211 Clinton Avenue S., Minneapolis, Minnesota
- Coordinates: 44°57′38.5″N 93°16′16″W
- Area: less than one acre
- Built: 1889–91
- Architect: Frederick Corser, et al.
- Architectural style: Romanesque Revival
- NRHP reference No.: 91001058

The Church of Saint Stephen is a historic Roman Catholic church in the Whittier neighborhood of Minneapolis in the U.S. state of Minnesota. This neighborhood is where entrepreneurs and businessmen built their mansions in the modern-day Washburn-Fair Oaks Mansion District. The building was constructed with sandstone, brick, concrete, and copper in 1889–1891.

It was listed in the National Register of Historic Places in 1991. It is considered significant as an early and well-preserved example of a Richardsonian Romanesque/Romanesque Revival church.

== History ==
The parish was founded in the 1880s to serve a largely Irish immigrant population.

In 2008, Fr. Joseph A. Williams was appointed as pastor. When Williams was appointed, the parish was largely failing to follow the rubrics of the Mass of the Second Vatican Council and did not submit to the teachings of the Catholic Church. Williams' efforts to bring the parish in line with Catholic teaching resulted in many of the older parishioners walking out in the middle of Mass and leaving the parish entirely. His first Christmas Mass at the parish had no worshippers. Williams eventually rebuilt the parish into a thriving Latino community, the largest in Minnesota, with over 1,600 families. Pope Francis appointed Williams as an auxiliary bishop of Saint Paul and Minneapolis on December 10, 2021. Williams remained as pastor of St. Stephen's until July 1, 2022.

On July 1, 2022, St. Stephen's merged with the nearby Holy Rosary parish to become the Church of St. Stephen-Holy Rosary.
