= Grain and Lumber Exchange Building =

- U.S. National Register of Historic Places
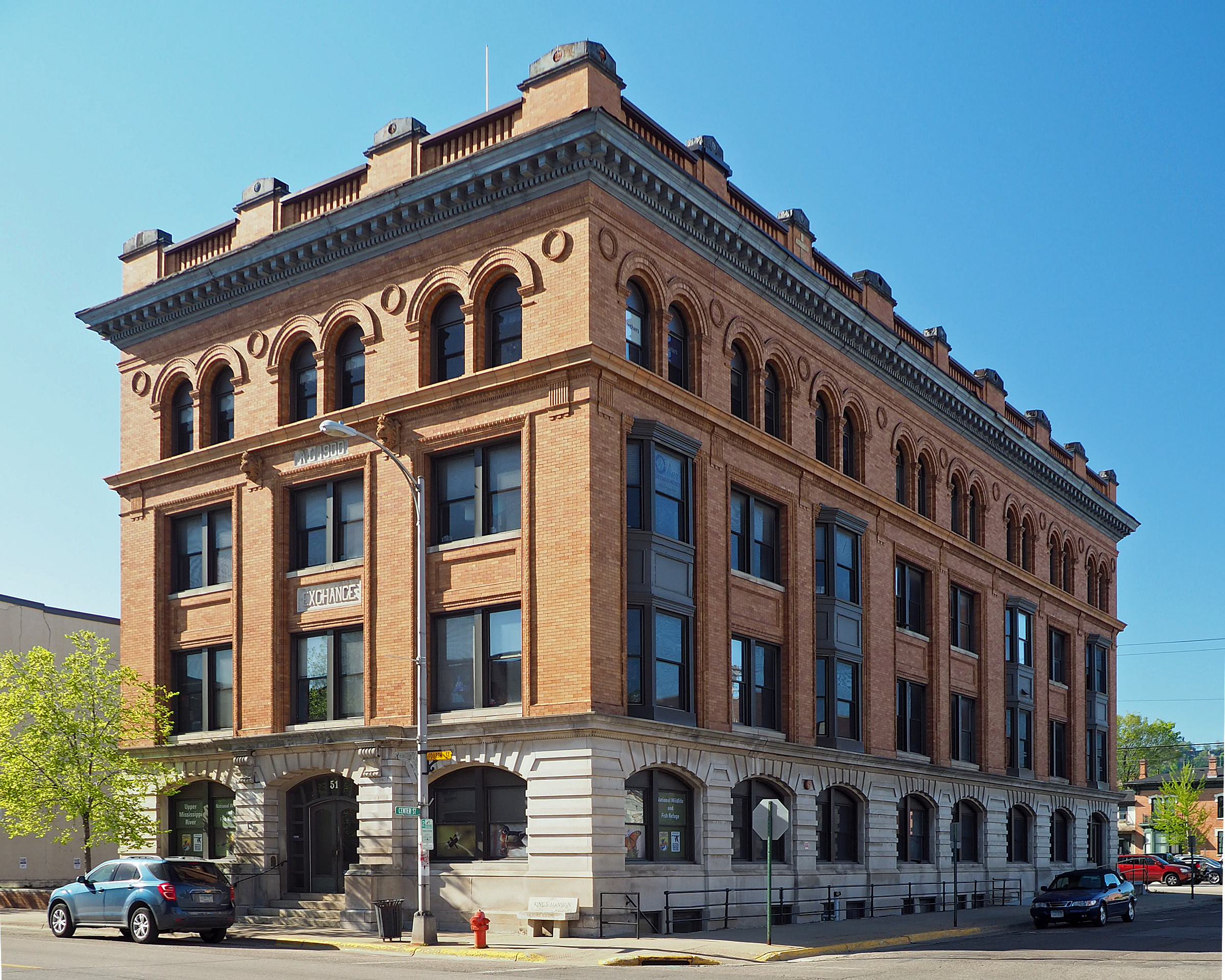
- The Grain and Lumber Exchange Building viewed from the north

- Location within Minnesota Location within the United States
- Location: 51 East 4th Street, Winona, Minnesota
- Coordinates: 44°3′4″N 91°38′13″W
- Area: Less than one acre
- Built: 1900
- Built by: John Lohse
- Architect: Kees & Colburn
- Architectural style: Renaissance Revival
- NRHP reference No.: 77000774
- Designated: December 2, 1977

The Grain and Lumber Exchange Building is a historic office building in Winona, Minnesota, United States. It was designed in Renaissance Revival style by the architectural firm of Kees & Colburn and built in 1900. The building was listed on the National Register of Historic Places in 1977 for its local significance in the theme of architecture. It was nominated for being among Winona's most architecturally distinctive office buildings from the turn of the 20th century. It is also notable for being designed to the specifications of its first tenants even though they were primarily renters rather than owners.

== See also ==
- National Register of Historic Places listings in Winona County, Minnesota
