= Lumber Exchange Building (South Bend, Washington) =

- U.S. National Register of Historic Places
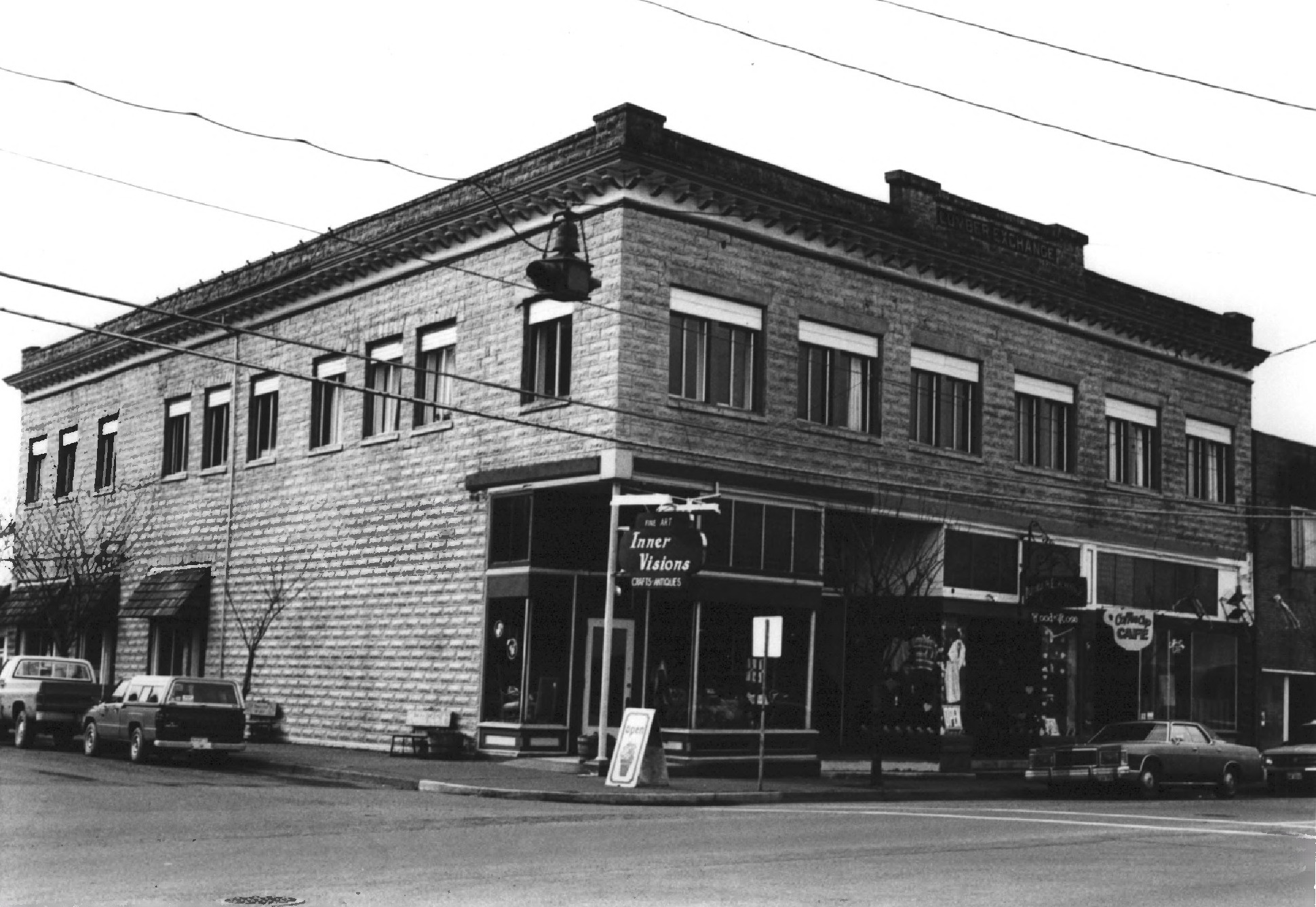
- The Lumber Exchange Building in 1987

- Location within Washington (state)
- Location: South Bend, Washington
- Coordinates: 46°39′58″N 123°48′42″W
- Built: 1907
- Architect: J.H. Lovering and H.F. Wilder
- Architectural style: Classical Revival
- NRHP reference No.: 88000604
- Added to NRHP: May 19, 1988

The Lumber Exchange Building was a building located on U.S. Route 101 in South Bend, Washington. It was built in 1907 and added to the National Register of Historic Places on May 19, 1988.

In February 2006, real estate company LANCO LLC announced an escrow deal to purchase the Lumber Exchange building as part of a development of two adjacent properties. The purchase was contingent on inspection by a structural engineer to make sure that the granite footings under the building were still stable. On May 7, 2006, part of the facade of the building collapsed onto the highway. The building had been unoccupied for several years. The building was razed on May 10, 2006, and the site is currently vacant.
