= Lumber Exchange Building =

- U.S. National Register of Historic Places
- Minneapolis Landmark
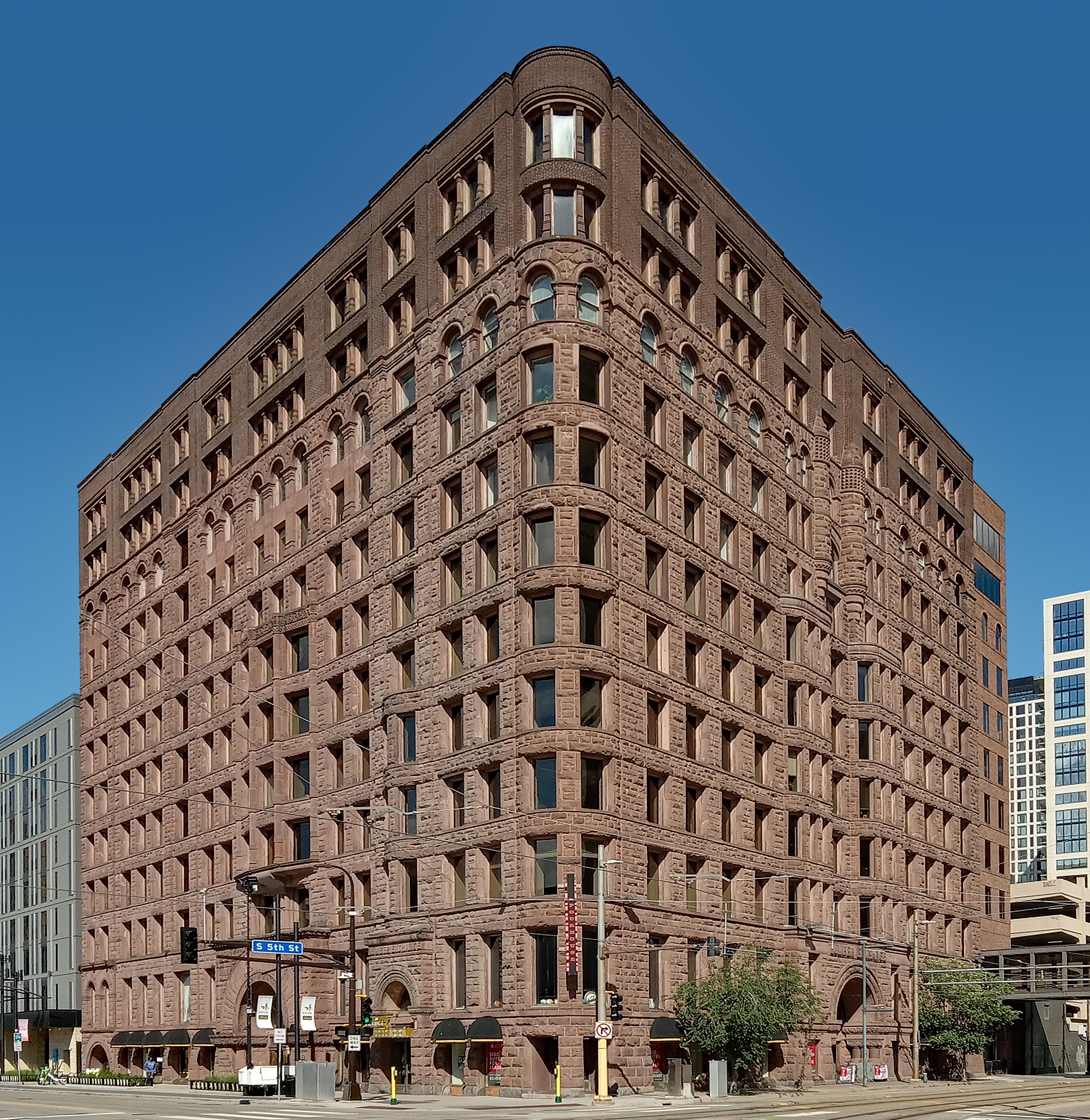
- The Lumber Exchange Building viewed from the west
- Location: 423-25 Hennepin Avenue; Minneapolis, Minnesota, United States
- Coordinates: 44°58′47″N 93°16′18″W
- Built: 1885
- Architect: Long and Kees
- Architectural style: Romanesque
- NRHP reference No.: 83000903

Significant dates
- Added to NRHP: May 19, 1983
- Designated MPLSL: 1983

The Lumber Exchange Building was the first skyscraper built in Minneapolis, Minnesota, United States, dating to 1885. It was designed in the Richardsonian Romanesque style by Franklin B. Long and Frederick Kees and was billed as one of the first fireproof buildings in the country. It is the oldest high-rise building standing in Minneapolis, and is the oldest building outside of New York City with 12 or more floors.

Franklin Long had formerly worked with Charles F. Haglin, while Frederick Kees had worked with Leroy Buffington for about four years. The partnership of Long and Kees, lasting from 1884 to 1897, was particularly successful and led to the construction of many of the largest buildings in the city in the 1880s and 1890s. Other buildings by these partners included the Public Library (1884), Masonic Temple (1888) (now the Hennepin Center for the Arts), Flour Exchange (1893–1897), Minneapolis City Hall (1889), and the Kasota Block (1884).

The building was built in multiple stages. Originally a tall, thin structure, an additional wing was added in 1890. Later, two stories were added at the top of the building. James Lileks, Minneapolis writer and architectural critic, says,

It's one of the few survivors from the early skyscraper era – and perhaps the ugliest. Of all the buildings on Hennepin, it's the least significant; across the street, the Masonic Temple – a near contemporary – is far more intriguing. The Lumber Exchange survived, though; perhaps it was just too big to knock down. It survived a fire, disrepair, neglect … it just won't go away."

The building suffered a fire on February 26, 1891.

The Lumber Exchange Building was listed on the National Register of Historic Places in 1983.

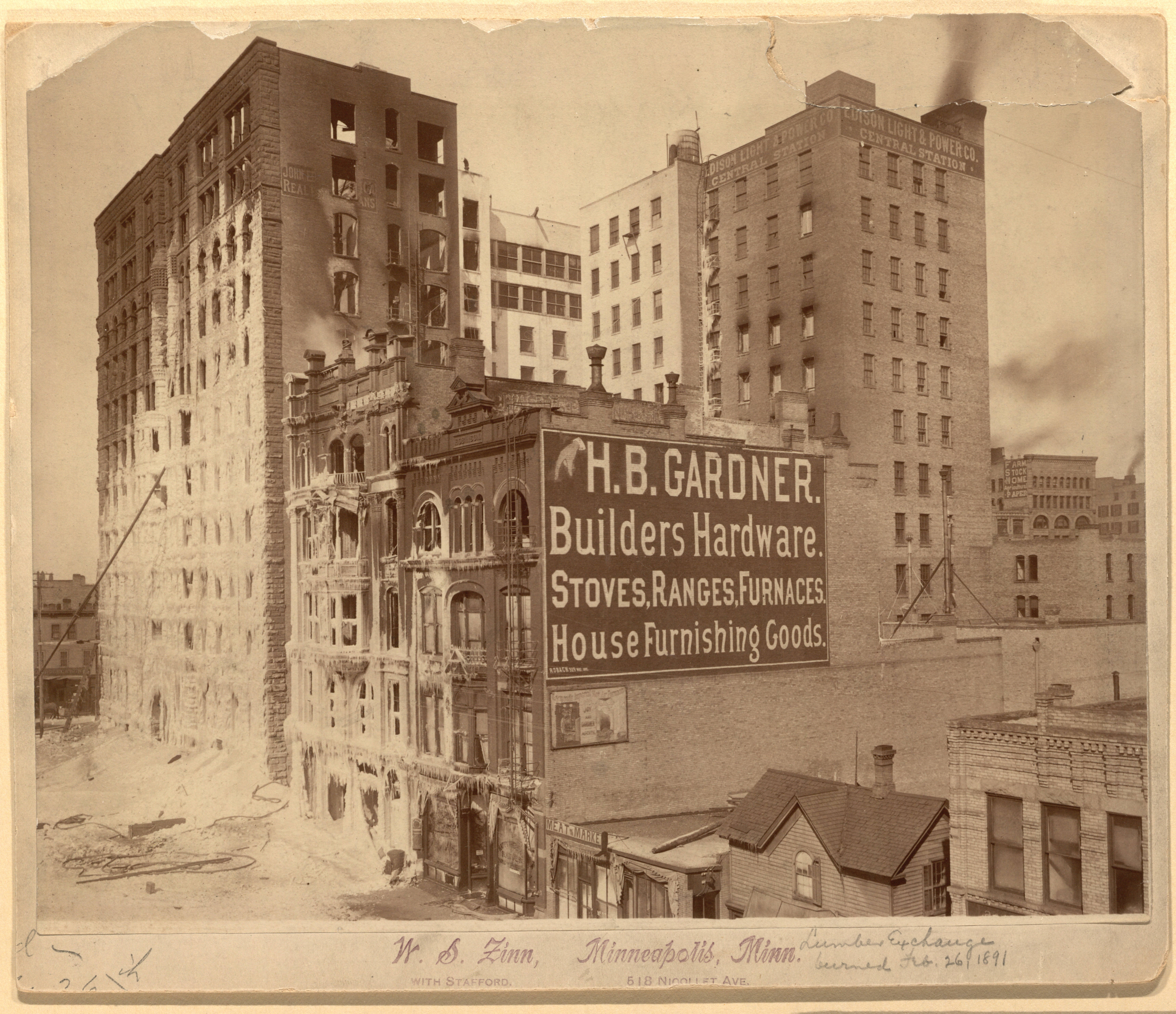
Lumber Exchange Building after the 1891 fire
