= Louis L. Long (Maryland architect) =

American architect

Louis L. Long was an American architect of Baltimore, Maryland. He designed about 30 buildings in Baltimore during approximately 1853–1860. Most of his works were done for Catholic organizations which explains why one of his best well-known works is the St. Ignatius Church located in Baltimore, MD. He served in the Army of the Confederate States of America during the American Civil War. At least two of his works are listed on the U.S. National Register of Historic Places.

Long's works include:

- Brownstone Row, 18-28 E. Mount Vernon Place, north side, Baltimore, Maryland
- St. Ignatius Church, Baltimore, Maryland
- St. Michael's Church Complex, 1900-1920 E. Lombard Street, Baltimore, Maryland (Long, Louis L.), NRHP-listed
- Saint Alphonsus Church, New Orleans, 2029 Constance St. New Orleans, Louisiana (Long, Louis L.), NRHP-listed

== See also ==
- Louis L. Long (Minnesota architect) (c.1870-1925) of Long, Lamoreaux & Long
