= Pittsburgh Plate Glass Company Building =

- Great Northern Implement Company
- U.S. National Register of Historic Places
- Minneapolis Landmark
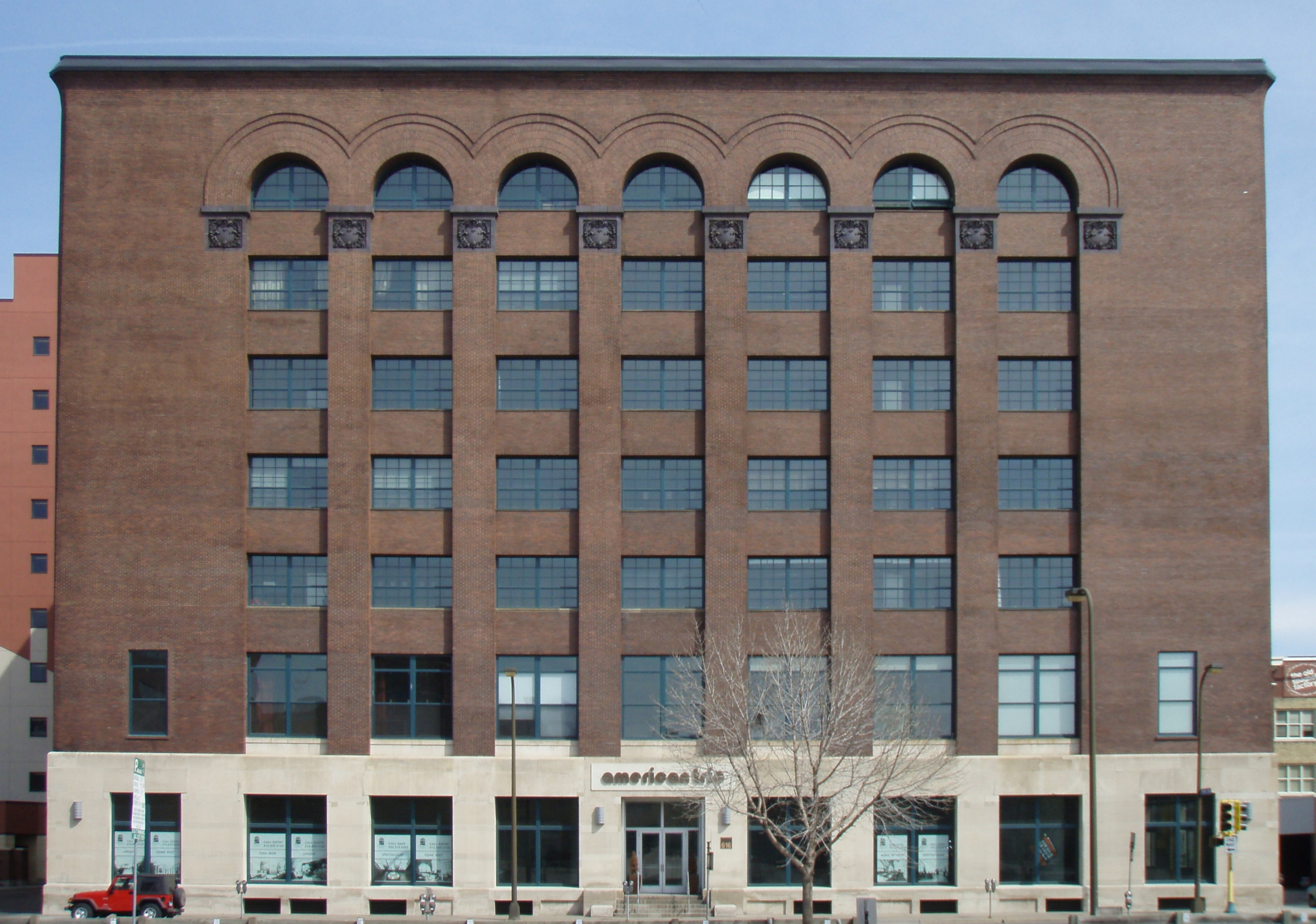

- Location within Minnesota Location within the United States
- Location: 616 S. 3rd St., Minneapolis, Minnesota
- Coordinates: 44°58′38″N 93°15′34″W
- Built: 1910
- Architect: Kees and Colburn
- Architectural style: Late 19th and Early 20th Century American Movements
- NRHP reference No.: 77000745

Significant dates
- Added to NRHP: September 13, 1977
- Designated MPLSL: 1977

The Pittsburgh Plate Glass Company Building, also known as the Northern Implement Company and the American Trio Building, is a warehouse building in downtown Minneapolis, Minnesota. PPG Industries of Pittsburgh constructed the structure.

== Background ==
It was designed by the architectural firm Kees and Colburn and shows strong influences of architect Louis Sullivan. The arches in the top floor windows are modeled after Louis Sullivan's designs, which in turn were influenced by Henry Hobson Richardson's Richardsonian Romanesque style. The corners of the building are subtly chamfered in at the bottom and rise toward a flaring cornice at the top, echoing John Wellborn Root's design of the Monadnock Building in Chicago.

The building has now been converted to loft apartments.
