= Serenus Colburn =

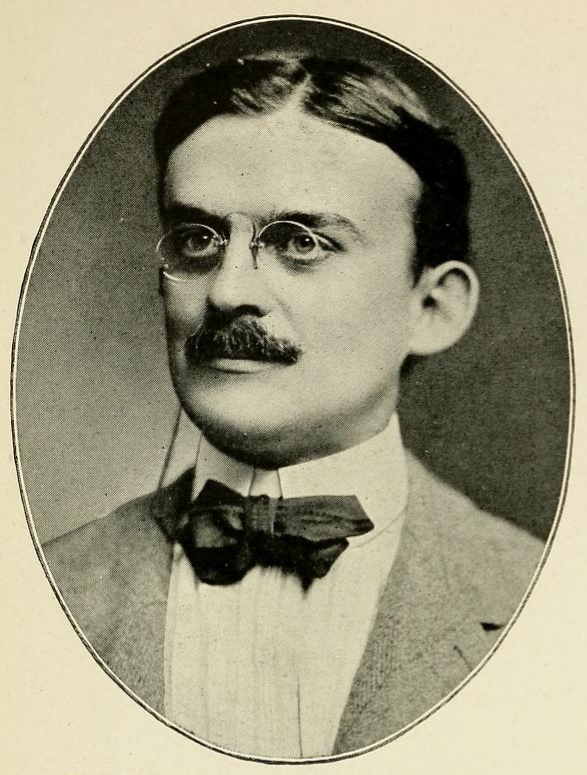
Colburn in an image published 1902

Serenus Milo Colburn (1871-1927) was an architect who worked in Minneapolis, Minnesota during the Golden Age of Flour production. Born in Ansonia, Connecticut on October 12, 1871, Colburn eventually came to work as head draftsman under William Channing Whitney in 1891. He left his position there in 1899 to work with Frederick Kees in the newly formed architectural firm Kees and Colburn. The firm enjoyed success creating houses, schools, and buildings such as the Loring Theater. Many of their works are listed on the National Register of Historic Places. In 1921, after more than 20 years of working together, the firm disbanded. Colburn went on to work with Ernest Forsell until his death on January 13, 1927. He was buried in Lakewood Cemetery.

== Works by Kees & Colburn ==
- Minneapolis Grain Exchange (originally the Minneapolis Chamber of Commerce), 1900–02
- Advance Thresher/Emerson-Newton Implement Company, 1900–04
- Orpheum Theatre, later the Seventh Street Theater, Minneapolis (1904; razed 1940)

== See also ==
- Frederick Kees
- National Register of Historic Places listings in Hennepin County, Minnesota
