= Franklin B. Long =

American architect

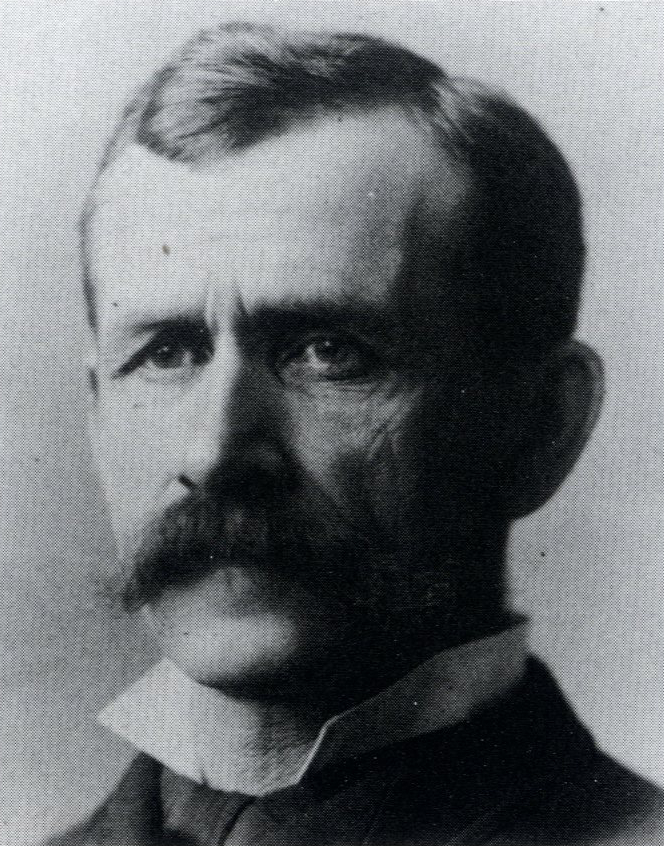
- Portrait of Long, c. 1900.
- Born: March 3, 1842
- Died: August 21, 1912 (aged 70)

Franklin B. Long (March 3, 1842 – August 21, 1912) was an architect notable for his work in Minneapolis, Minnesota with the firm Long and Kees.

== Life and career ==
Long was born in South Bainbridge, New York on March 3, 1842. His family moved to Woodstock, Illinois in 1859, and then he later moved to Chicago to work as a carpenter and a builder. Becoming interested in architecture, he joined the office of John C. Cochrane as a draftsman. He moved to Minneapolis in 1868 and entered a partnership with Robert Alden, an established Minneapolis architect. When Alden died in 1877, Long partnered with Charles F. Haglin until the early 1880s. Long built the Kasota Block at 4th and Hennepin in 1884, then joined with Frederick Kees.

The partnership of Long and Kees produced several notable works, including Minneapolis City Hall, First Baptist Church (Minneapolis) (1883–85), the former Minneapolis Public Library building (built in 1884 and razed in 1961), and the Minneapolis Masonic Temple (now the Hennepin Center for the Arts) in 1888.

After the partnership of Long and Kees disbanded in 1898, Long partnered with his son Louis and Louis Lamoreaux in the firm Long, Lamoreaux and Long. Franklin B. Long died in Minneapolis on August 21, 1912. Even after Long's death (and after his son had moved on), the name "Long" remained in the company's name because he had been so well known.
