= Pence Automobile Company Building =

- U.S. National Register of Historic Places
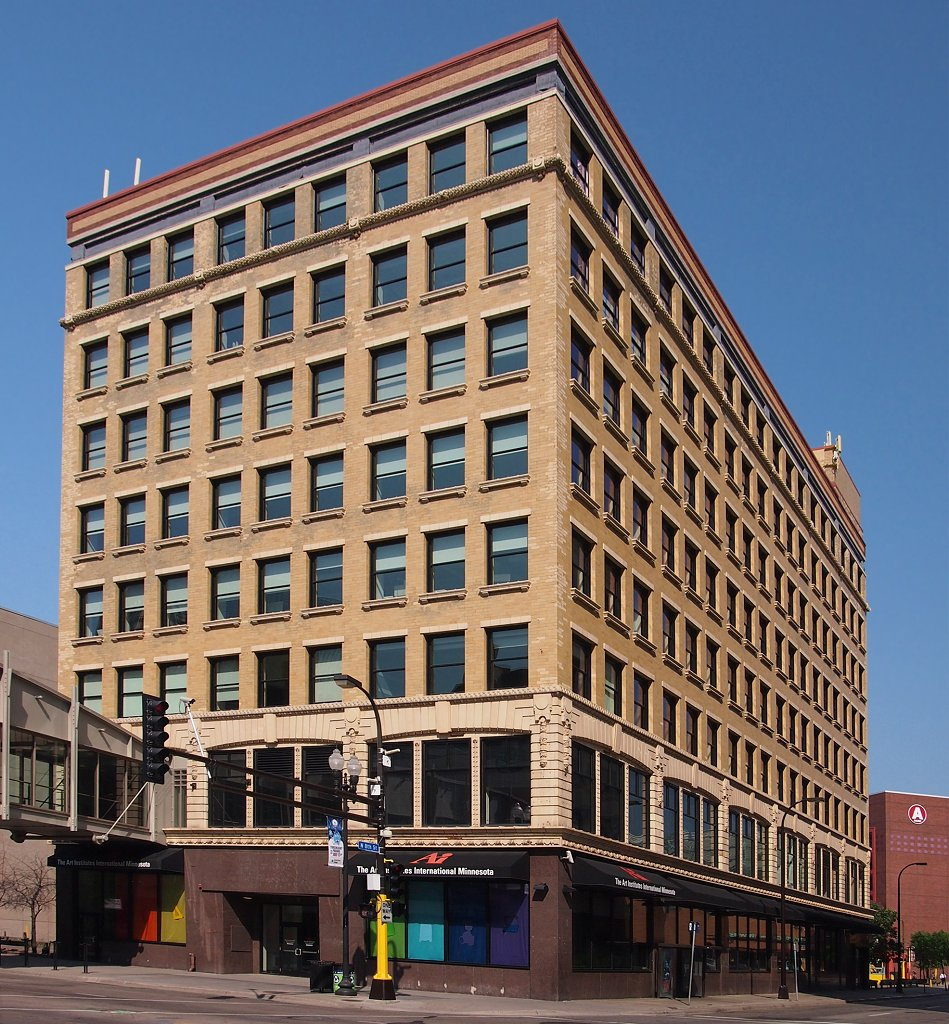
- The Pence Automobile Company Building from the east

- Location within Minnesota Location within the United States
- Location: 800 Hennepin Ave., Minneapolis, Minnesota
- Coordinates: 44°58′38″N 93°16′33″W
- Built: 1909; 117 years ago
- Architect: Long, Franklin; et al.
- Architectural style: Classical Revival
- NRHP reference No.: 07001314
- Added to NRHP: December 27, 2007

The Pence Automobile Company Building is a building in downtown Minneapolis, Minnesota, United States, listed on the National Register of Historic Places. It was designed in the Classical Revival style by the Minneapolis architectural practice of Long and Long and built in 1909. The building housed sales showrooms and offices, automobile repair and service, and storage for parts, accessories, and finished vehicles. It was listed on the National Register as a commemoration of the extraordinary growth of the auto industry during the early 20th century.

== History ==
The building resembles the work of Louis Sullivan and George Grant Elmslie and other skyscraper pioneers. It has a common arrangement of a base, shaft, and column, with a rather plain shaft but a good assortment of detail around the base. The applied ornamentation around the base has classical sculptural details, but also has terra cotta ornamentation more in line with Louis Sullivan's work.

== Harry E. Pence ==
The owner of the company, Harry E. Pence (1868–1933), was born in Springboro, Ohio. He moved to Minneapolis at age 18 to join his uncle, John Wesley Pence, who had various business interests in the area. In June 1902, Harry Pence attended an auto race between Minneapolis and Lake Minneapolis (sic) and decided to go into business selling automobiles. He decided on selling the Cadillac based on his perceptions of its good service and reliability. His dealership was the second auto dealership in Minneapolis, and in 1903 he sold 83 cars. Pence eventually decided that automobiles should have larger engines than one cylinder, but Cadillac turned his idea down. Buick agreed to make a larger engine, so Pence switched to selling Buicks. Pence's dealership grew to sell, at one time, 29 percent of all Buicks that were being manufactured. in 1918 Harry Pence won the Minneapolis St. Paul Rochester & Dubuque Electric Traction Company, better known as The Dan Patch Electric Lines, after the death of its previous owner Marion Willis Savage. He soon reorganized it into the Minneapolis, Northfield & Southern Railway.

== See also ==
- Pence Automobile Company Warehouse
