= Pence Automobile Company Warehouse =

- U.S. National Register of Historic Places
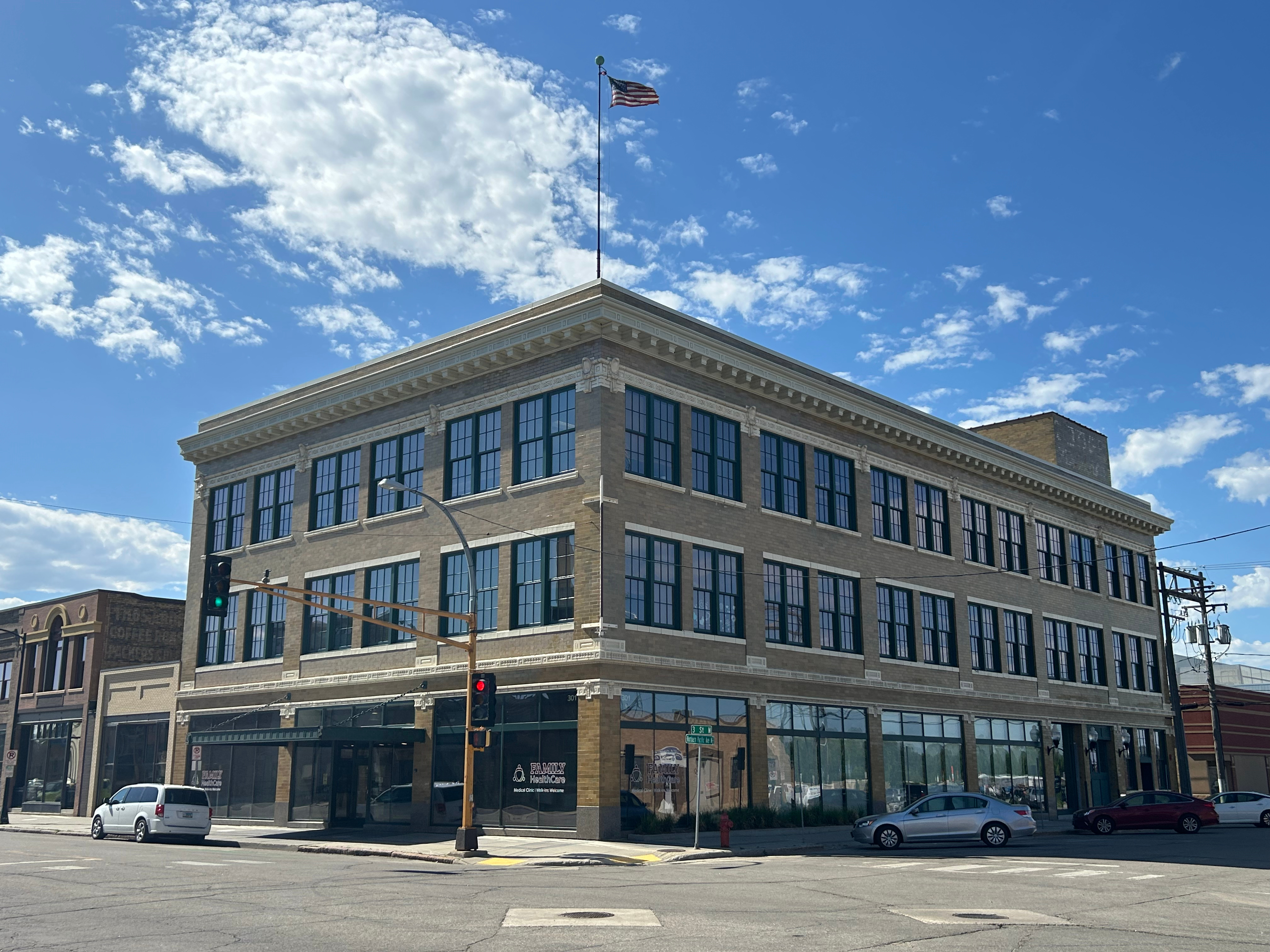

- Location within North Dakota Location within the United States
- Location: 301 Northern Pacific Ave., Fargo, North Dakota
- Coordinates: 46°52′34″N 96°46′57″W
- Area: less than one acre
- Built: 1920
- Architect: Long, Lamoreaux & Long
- Architectural style: Classical Revival
- NRHP reference No.: 93001478
- Added to NRHP: January 7, 1994

The Pence Automobile Company Warehouse, also known as Richtman's Printing, is a historic commercial building located on Northern Pacific Avenue in Fargo, North Dakota. It was designed in 1918 by Minneapolis architects Long, Lamoreaux & Long in Classical Revival architecture. The building was completed in 1920 at a cost of more than $175,000. It was listed on the National Register of Historic Places in 1994.

It is a three-story building that was originally designed to be the premier auto sales and service building in the area. It was designed with a car and truck showroom on the ground floor and service and storage above.

Harry E. Pence (1868–1933) of Minneapolis was president and general manager of the Pence Automobile, the major regional distributor of Buick automobiles.

== See also ==
- Pence Automobile Company Building
