= Advance Thresher/Emerson-Newton Implement Company =

Historic buildings in Minnesota, U.S.

- U.S. National Register of Historic Places
- Minneapolis Landmark
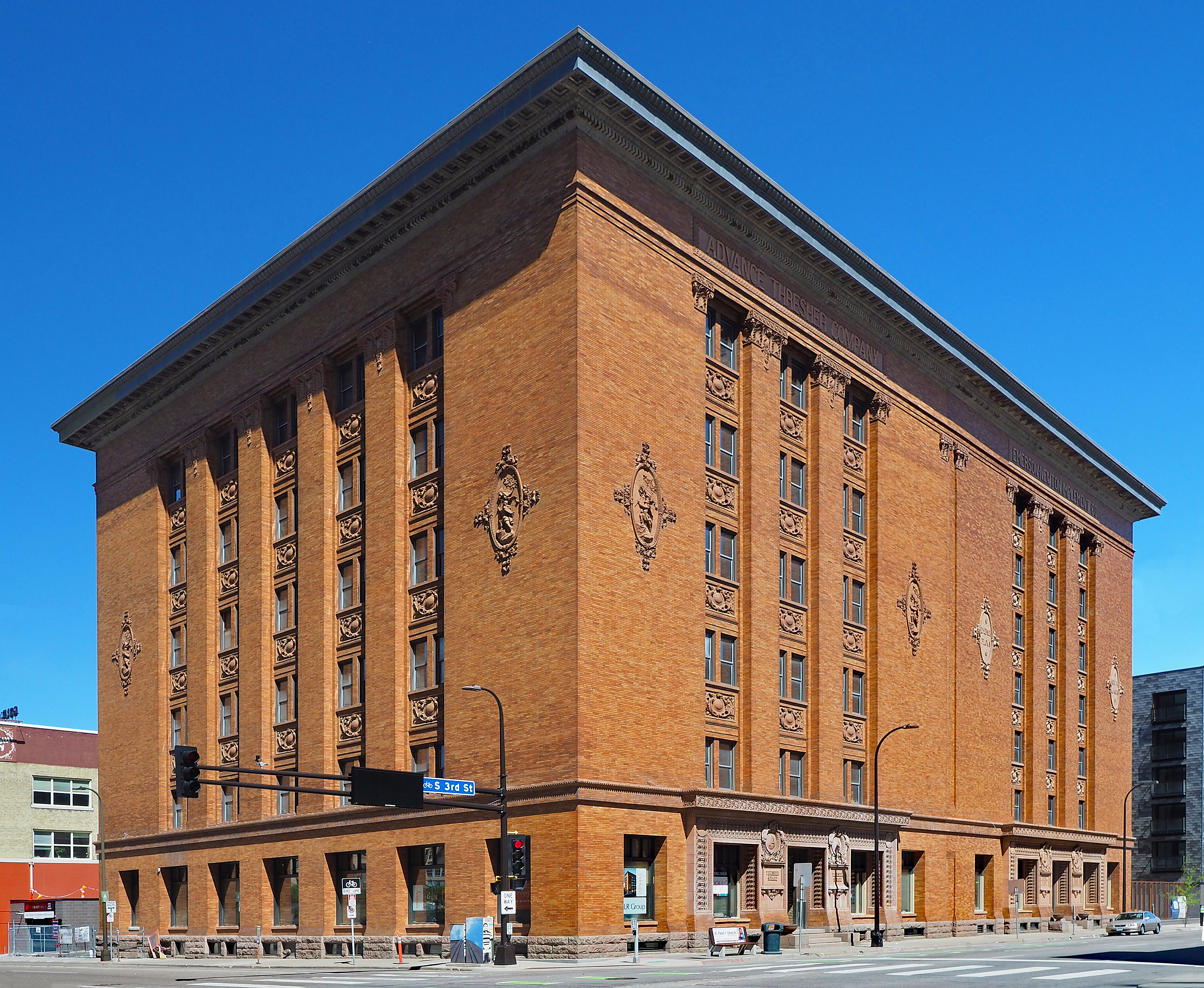
- The Advance Thresher/Emerson-Newton Implement Company buildings from the west

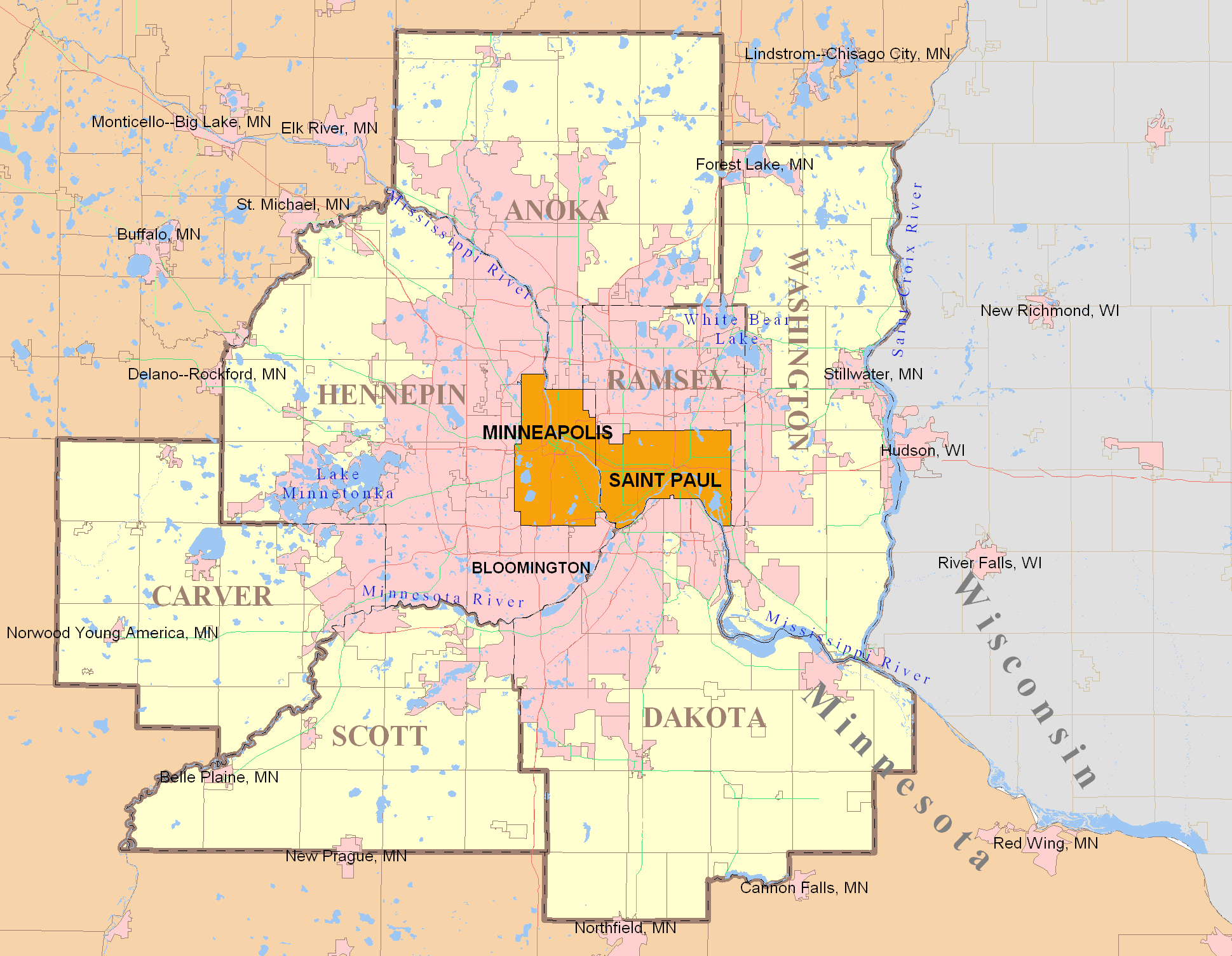
- Location within Minneapolis–Saint Paul Location within Minnesota Location within the United States
- Location: 700–704 South 3rd Street, Minneapolis, Minnesota
- Coordinates: 44°58′36.5″N 93°15′32″W
- Area: Less than one acre
- Built: 1900, 1904
- Architect: Kees & Colburn
- Architectural style: Late 19th And Early 20th Century American Movements
- NRHP reference No.: 77000736

Significant dates
- Added to NRHP: September 20, 1977
- Designated MPLSL: 1977

The Advance Thresher/Emerson-Newton Implement Company buildings in Minneapolis, Minnesota, United States, are a pair of buildings designed by Kees and Colburn. The two buildings are united under a common cornice and appear to be a single structure. However, the two buildings were actually built four years apart. The Advance Thresher Company building was built in 1900 and has six floors. The adjacent Emerson-Newton Plow Company building was built in 1904 and has seven floors.

The architecture of the buildings was influenced by Louis Sullivan. They are ornamented with terra cotta details that are more Classical Revival in nature. The buildings were renovated into offices in the 1980s. As of August 2024, the buildings house a Canopy by Hilton hotel and two restaurants. They are listed on the National Register of Historic Places for local significance in architecture for exemplifying the Sullivanesque style influencing large industrial and commercial buildings at the turn of the 20th century.

== See also ==
- National Register of Historic Places listings in Hennepin County, Minnesota
