= Long, Lamoreaux & Long =

Long, Lamoreaux & Long was an architectural partnership in Minneapolis, Minnesota, of Franklin B. Long (1842–1912), Lowell A. Lamoreaux (December 23, 1861 – February 1, 1922), and Franklin's son Louis L. Long (c. 1870–1925).

Franklin B. Long had previously partnered in Long and Kees.

A number of Lamoreaux's, Louis Long's and the firm's works are listed on the National Register of Historic Places.

Works individually by Lamoreaux, by Louis Long, or by the firm include (with attribution):

- Eitel Hospital, 1367 Willow St. Minneapolis, MN (Lamoreaux, Lowell A.), NRHP-listed
- Pence Automobile Company Warehouse, 301 N. P Ave. Fargo, ND (Long, Lamoreaux & Long), NRHP-listed
- Red Wing City Hall, W. 4th St. Red Wing, MN (Lamoreaux, Lowell), NRHP-listed
- T. B. Sheldon Memorial Auditorium, 443 W. 3rd St. Red Wing, MN (Lamoreaux, Lowell), NRHP-listed
- Theodore Wirth House-Administration Building, 3954 Bryant Ave. S Minneapolis, MN (Lamoreauz, Lowell A.), NRHP-listed
- Weyburn Security Bank Building, 76 3rd Street, Weyburn, Saskatchewan, Canada
- Wyuka Cemetery, 3600 O St. Lincoln, NE (Lamoreaux, L.A.), NRHP-listed
- Anne C. and Frank B. Semple House, 100-104 W. Franklin Ave. Minneapolis, MN (Long, Franklin B.; Long, Louis), NRHP-listed

== See also ==
- Louis L. Long (Maryland architect)
