= Hennepin Center for the Arts =

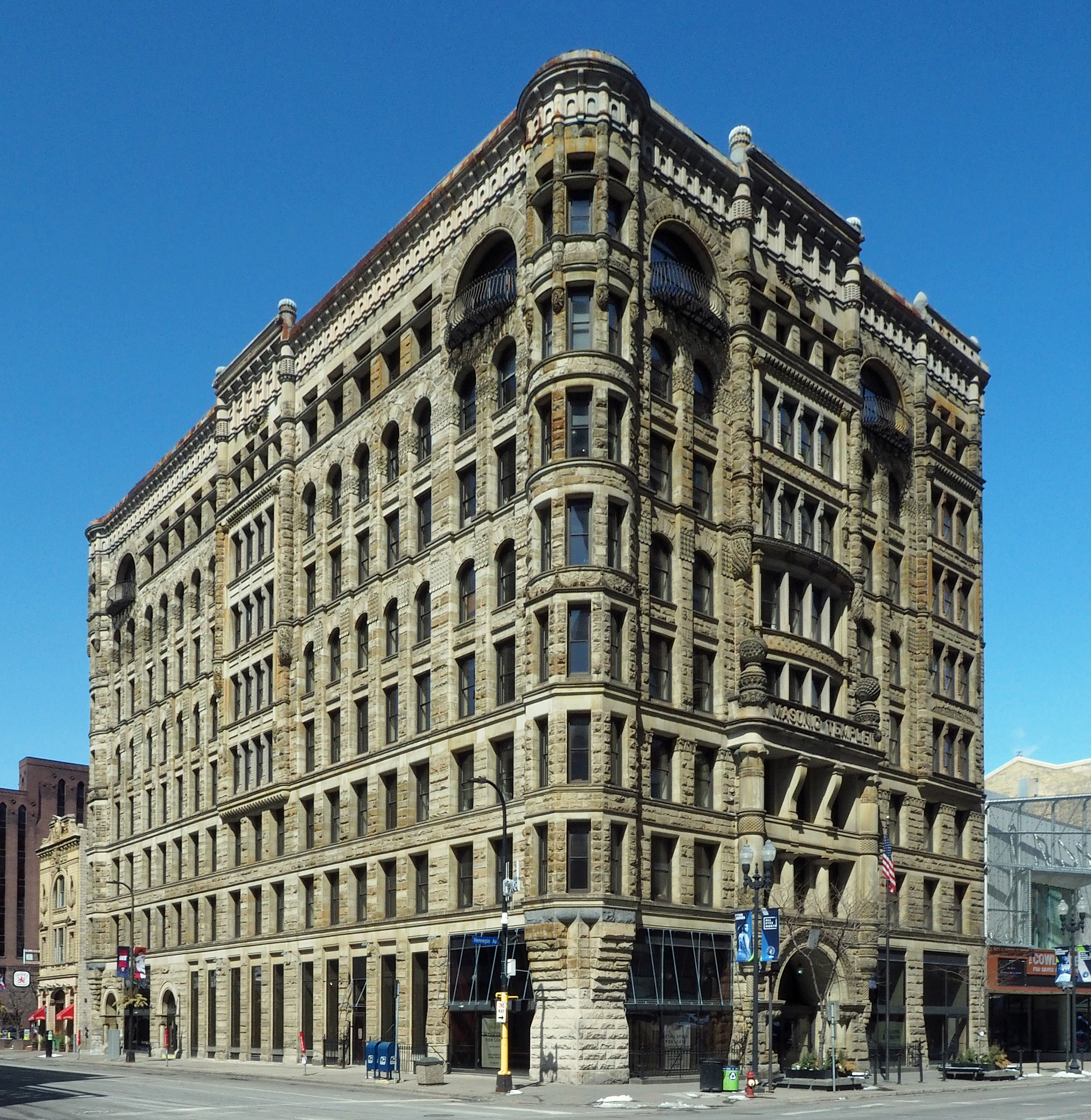
- The Hennepin Center for the Arts from the south

General information
- Location: 528 Hennepin Avenue, Minneapolis, Minnesota
- Masonic Temple
- U.S. National Register of Historic Places
- Minneapolis Landmark
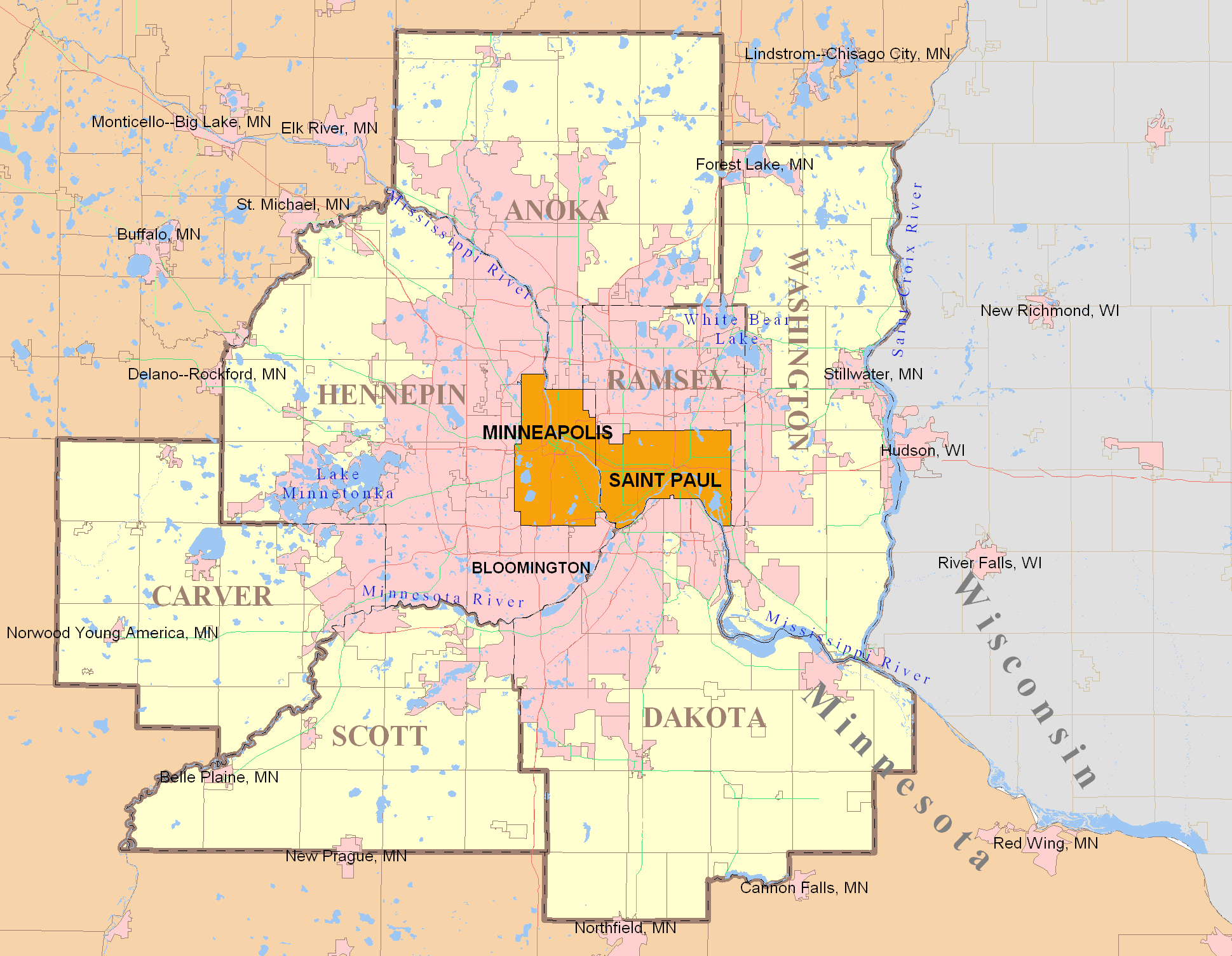
- Location within Minneapolis–Saint Paul Location within Minnesota Location within the United States
- Coordinates: 44°58′45″N 93°16′25″W
- Area: Less than one acre
- Built: 1888
- Architect: Long and Kees
- Architectural style: Richardsonian Romanesque
- NRHP reference No.: 75000987

Significant dates
- Added to NRHP: September 5, 1975
- Designated MPLSL: 1980

The Hennepin Center for the Arts (HCA) is an art center in Minneapolis, Minnesota, United States. It occupies a building on Hennepin Avenue constructed in 1888 as a Masonic Temple. The building was designed by Long and Kees in the Richardsonian Romanesque architectural style. In 1978, it was purchased and underwent a renovation to become the HCA. Currently it is owned by Artspace Projects, Inc, and is home to more than 17 performing and visual art companies who reside on the building's eight floors. The eighth floor contains the Illusion Theater, which hosts many shows put on by companies in the building.

HCA is now a part of the Cowles Center for Dance and the Performing Arts (formerly the Minnesota Shubert Performing Arts and Education Center). The new performing arts center is a three-building complex that includes the renovated Shubert Theatre building (renamed the Goodale Theater) and a new glass-walled atrium connecting the two historic buildings and serving them both as a common lobby. The Cowles Center hosted a three-day Grand Opening Gala September 9–11, 2011.

The building was listed as the Masonic Temple on the National Register of Historic Places in 1975 for its local significance in the theme of architecture. It was nominated for the craftsmanship and integrity of its design by a significant local architectural firm, and for being one of the last well-preserved Richardsonian Romanesque business buildings in Minneapolis.

== See also ==
- List of former Masonic buildings in the United States
- National Register of Historic Places listings in Hennepin County, Minnesota
