= DRE =

DRE may refer to:

- Dre (album), 2010 by American rapper Soulja Boy Tell 'Em, 2010
- Dre (given name)
  - Dr. Dre, American rapper and producer
  - Laura Dre, German-Filipina electronic musician, singer-songwriter and music producer
- Dre (Tibetan), one of the eight classes of gods and demons in Tibetan Buddhism
- DRE voting machine
- Digital rectal examination, in medicine
- Director of religious education; for example, Northwest Unitarian Universalist Congregation § Religious education
- Directorio Revolucionario Estudiantil, CIA backed anti-Castro group based in Miami
- Drug Recognition Expert, law enforcement
- Drug resistant epilepsy, in neurology
- Dense-rock equivalent, in geology/volcanology
