= Occupy Minneapolis =

Protest group against economic inequality

Occupy Minneapolis [OccupyMN]
- Part of the Occupy Movement
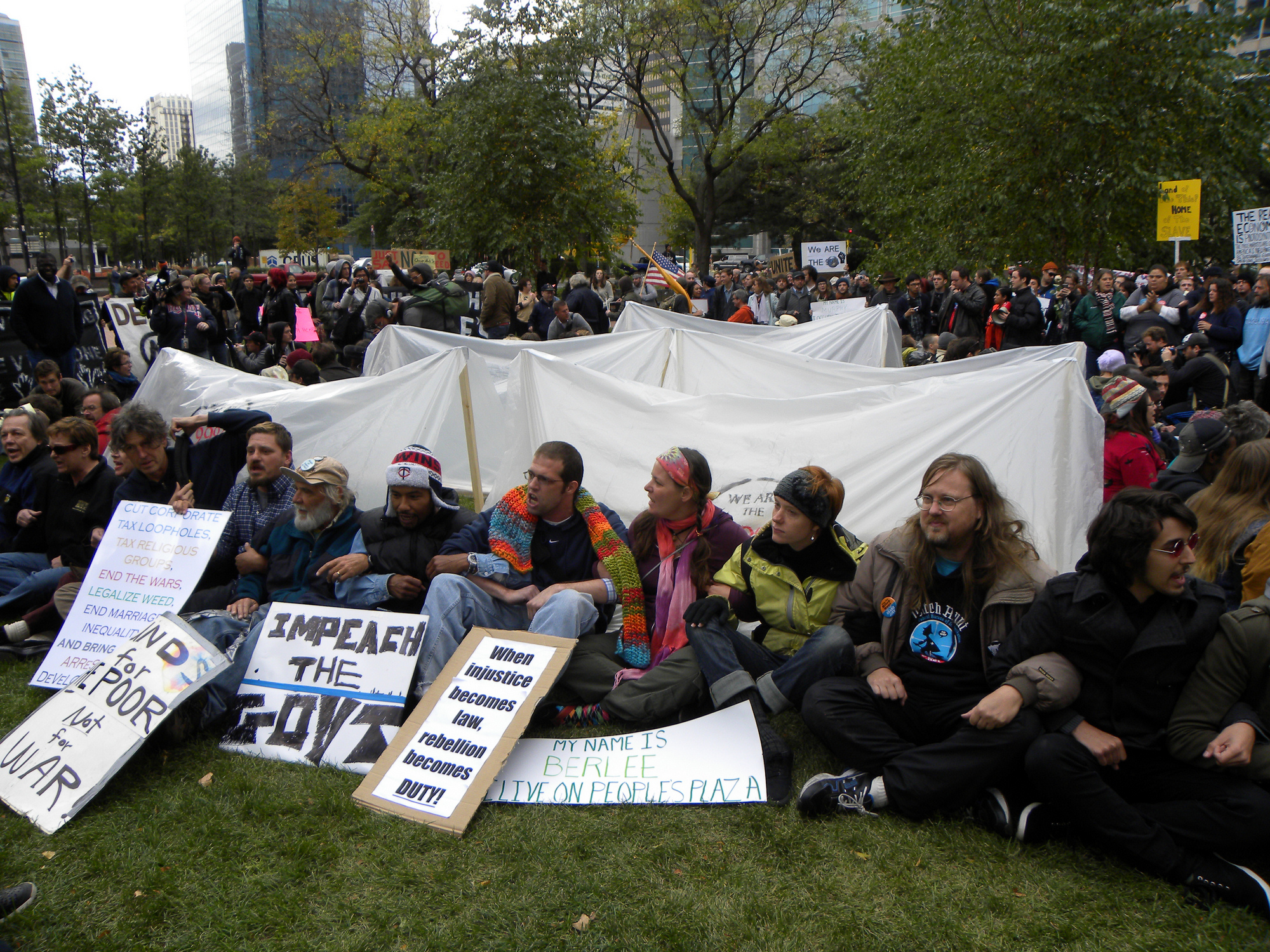
- Occupy Minneapolis protesters link arms, surrounding tents set up on October 15, 2011 at Hennepin County Government Center
- Date: October 7, 2011 – ongoing (5517 days)
- Location: Minneapolis, Minnesota
- Caused by: Wealth inequality; Regulatory capture; Political corruption; Police brutality
- Methods: Non violent protest; Civil disobedience; Occupation; Picketing
- Status: Ongoing
- Result: Success in above

Parties
OccupyMN.org - Events & Info; Minneapolis General Assembly	Minneapolis City Government; Minneapolis Police Department; Hennepin County Sheriff's Office

Lead figures
Minneapolis General Assembly	Mayor R. T. Rybak; Police Chief Tim Dolan; City Council President Barb Johnson; Sheriff Rich Stanek

Occupy Minneapolis (OccupyMN) is a grassroots collaboration that began in October 2011 with a series of demonstrations in Minneapolis, Minnesota. Protesters have staged numerous occupations, most notably of the Hennepin County Government Center plaza.

Occupy Minneapolis is allied with New York City's Occupy Wall Street and is part of the global Occupy movement. The main issues that organizers seek to address are social and economic inequality, greed, corruption and the undue influence of corporations on government. Occupy Minneapolis protesters engage in direct action and use consensus decision-making in their general assemblies.

Occupy Minneapolis began as a protest encampment at Hennepin County Government Center plaza on October 7, 2011, renaming the site "The People's Plaza". It was eventually cleared out by law enforcement agencies after members of the Hennepin County Board chose to create new rules restricting the use of the public plaza. As a result, police began to selectively enforce these rules and issue trespass orders against those who were found in violation of them.

As a part of the Occupy Homes movement, Minneapolis activists coordinated the occupation of homes threatened with foreclosure by US Bank and Bank of America, successfully preventing evictions and securing loan modifications.

In Spring 2012, protesters set up dual occupations of Peavey Plaza and Loring Park in downtown Minneapolis. Organizers and activists were told that they could erect tents for the use of storage during the resurgence. Late in the day of the reoccupation police communicated to protesters that they were planning to selectively enforce ordinances derived from the Minneapolis City Attorney's office stating that protesters and their equipment were interfering with, and blocking the public right of way. This selectively enforced local ordinance led to an escalation that resulted in both arrests, and the excessive use of force by the Minneapolis Police Department.

Occupy Minneapolis continued to engage in organized meetings, events and actions throughout the summer of 2014, with their emphasis shifting away from occupations of public spaces and towards addressing the foreclosure crisis through the Occupy Homes movement. along with creating active support networks for other locally-based movements and issues.

== Occupations & Major Events ==
=== The People's Plaza ===
The initial occupation of Hennepin County Government Center's plaza in downtown Minneapolis on October 7, 2011 was under the name OccupyMN. The plaza, located off the light rail station and adjacent to City Hall, was renamed The People's Plaza by rally organizers. Hundreds of protesters showed up at the plaza, including union members from United Steelworkers, the International Brotherhood of Electrical Workers, UNITE HERE, AFSCME, and the Sheet Metal Workers.

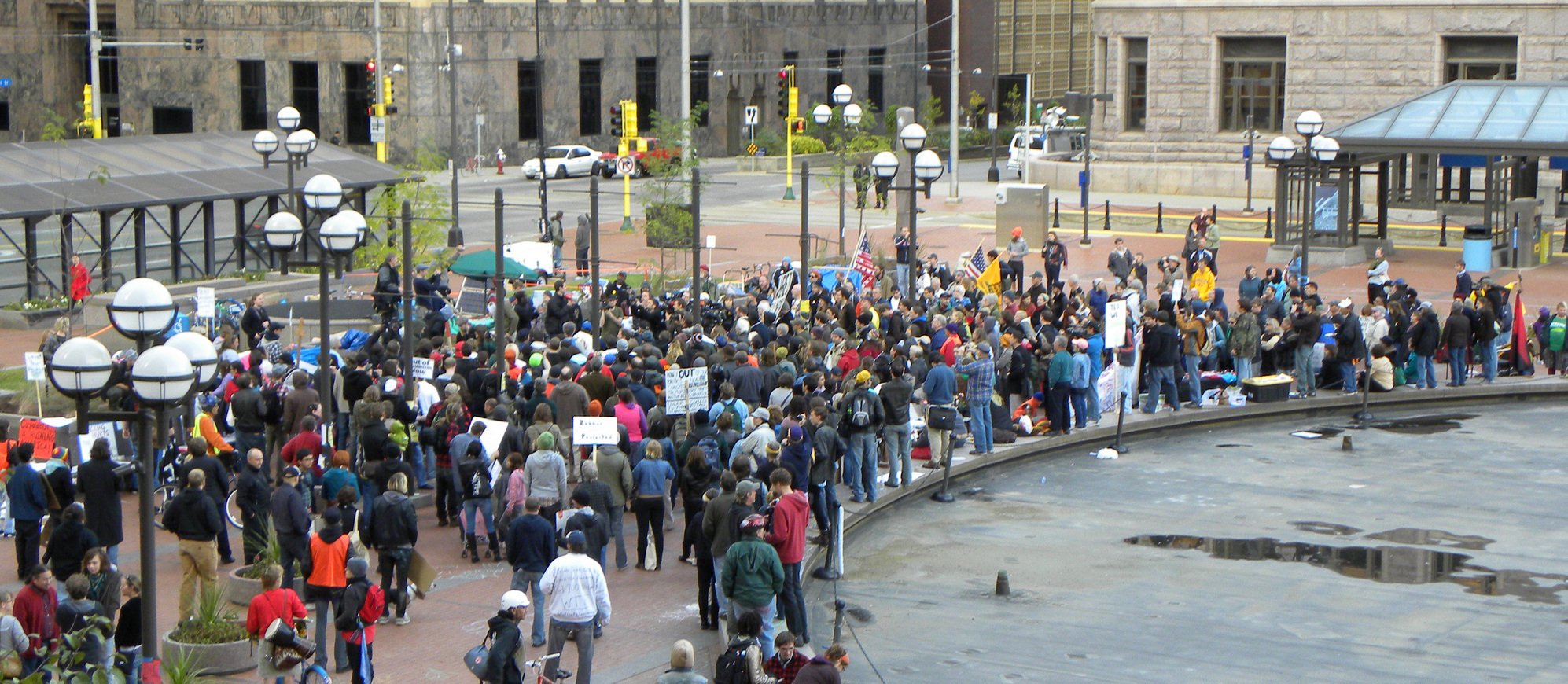
Occupy Minneapolis protesters gather at The People's Plaza in front of the Hennepin County Government Center

On October 13, Occupy protester Melissa Lynn Hill was given a trespassing notice for writing messages in chalk in the Plaza. She was barred from entering the Government Center or the plaza for a year. Two days later, while acting as a legal observer for the National Lawyers Guild and standing on a sidewalk near the Plaza, Hill was arrested. Her attorney successfully sued Hennepin County Sheriff Rich Stanek for violating her constitutional rights.

Sheriff Stanek ordered that tents could not be pitched in the Plaza and forbade people from staying overnight. Occupy protesters defied the orders, staying overnight in the plaza. On October 15, in conjunction with world-wide protests that day, a group of occupiers set up a number of tents in the grassy area on the south side of Hennepin County Government Center. The tents were torn down by the police later that night. Subsequent attempts to set up tents were met with force.

Marches on October 17 included attendees from Minnesota for a Fair Economy, Students for a Democratic Society, and Socialist Alternative. Protesters occupied the 10th Avenue Bridge, blocking traffic for about a half-hour. Eleven people were arrested on the bridge.

After the Hennepin County Sheriff's Office indicated they would no longer allow signs in the Plaza, the General Assembly voted to allow the American Civil Liberties Union to represent them in a potential lawsuit against the County. On November 4, Hennepin County employees removed signs from the plaza over the objections of the occupiers, who later replaced the signs, risking arrest. The next week, the Hennepin County Board of Commissioners drafted new rules forbidding people from sleeping in the plaza.

=== Foreclosed Homes ===
Occupy Minneapolis was among the first cities in the United States to organize the occupation of foreclosed homes as part of the Occupy Homes initiative. Occupy members worked with Neighborhoods Organizing for Change to prevent the eviction of several Minneapolis residents.

North Minneapolis resident Monique White was the first homeowner to work with Occupy activists, who set up tents in her front yard. She faced eviction after her home was foreclosed by US Bank and turned downed an offer of "cash for keys."

Occupy Minneapolis occupied the home of University of Minnesota anthropology professor Sara Kaiser, located in the Corcoran neighborhood and foreclosed by US Bank. On November 19, 2011, Minneapolis police tried to evict the Occupy Minneapolis organizers housed there. Protester Michael Bounds (Panda) was arrested inside the house. After situating himself in front of a police cruiser, Devin Wynn-Shemanek was nearly run over, then arrested and charged with obstruction of justice. Officers then attempted to board up the house's windows, but were thwarted by protesters who linked arms and surrounded the house. Once the police left the property, 50 protesters reoccupied the house, livestreaming their actions.

Organizers from Occupy Minneapolis joined with Neighborhoods Organizing for Change to help ex-Marine and Vietnam veteran Bobby Hull save his home from foreclosure by Bank of America (BoA). While Hull owed $275,000 on his mortgage, his home only brought in $80,000 at auction. A BoA spokesperson said that Hull did not meet the guidelines for home retention. Occupy worked with Hull's neighbors and put pressure on the bank to prevent an eviction that was scheduled for February 17, 2012. In January, activists dressed as pirates delivered a petition to US Bank requesting the renegotiation of mortgages for foreclosed homeowners and demanded a meeting with US Bank CEO Richard Davis. The organizers eventually succeeded in securing a loan modification for Hull that allowed him to remain in his home.

=== Reoccupy Minneapolis ===
Video of arrests of Reoccupy Minneapolis protesters on Nicollet Mall on April 7, 2012 showing KSTP cameraman Chad Nelson's camera flipped to the ground.

Spring 2012 saw a resurgence of activity for Occupy Minneapolis. Dual occupations of both Loring Park and Peavey Plaza, nicknamed "Reoccupy Minnesota," took root on April 7, with occupiers voicing their intent to stay throughout the summer. Mixed messages were given to protesters when police spokesman Steve McCarty indicated that the Minneapolis Police Department would allow tents to remain overnight in Peavey Plaza and Police Chief Tim Dolan later contradicted him, visiting the Plaza himself to pass out copies of city ordinances to occupiers. That night, protesters took to the streets, marching their tents through downtown Minneapolis. Twelve of the marchers were arrested and, during the fracas, a police officer shoved KSTP cameraman Chad Nelson, knocking his camera to the ground and injuring him. Chief Dolan indicated that Internal Affairs was investigating the incident.

On April 10, members of Occupy Minneapolis went to City Hall and asked that Minneapolis Mayor R.T. Rybak condemn racial profiling and police brutality. Days later, Barb Johnson, President of the Minneapolis City Council, introduced a resolution to close the city's public plazas at night. Council members Cam Gordon and Gary Schiff criticized the move, and the plan was sent to the Committee for Public Safety, Civil Rights and Health for a public hearing.

Occupy Homes MN activists continued working alongside Minneapolis–Saint Paul area homeowners throughout the summer of 2012. In early May 2012, Occupy Minneapolis helped homeowner Monique White renegotiate her mortgage with US Bank. The activists also began another occupation of a foreclosed home in South Minneapolis. South Minneapolis resident Alejandra Cruz and her family worked with Occupy to secure their foreclosed home. While Minneapolis City Council member Gary Schiff joined a rally at City Hall in support of the Cruz family, the response from the Minneapolis Police Department was harsh and the Cruz home was raided four times. Local musician Brother Ali came out in support of the family and joined Occupy Homes activists in crossing police lines and being arrested. St. Paul homeowner Caylin Crawford worked with Occupy Homes activists and in November 2012 she was able to secure a rare deal from Freddie Mac that allowed her to stay in her home.

=== Police Handing Out Drugs ===
On May 2, 2012, activists with Occupy Minneapolis released a documentary video called MK Occupy Minnesota. The video documents testimony from participants that police officers in Minneapolis gave them cannabis as part of a Drug Recognition Expert program.

=== OccupyMN ===
Minnesota has spawned Occupy movements in other cities. Prominent Occupy groups have formed in Saint Paul, Rochester, and Duluth. Occupy marches and occupations have taken place in Brainerd, Grand Rapids, Mankato, Fergus Falls, Bemidji, Alexandria, Marshall, Fargo–Moorhead and Northfield.

The original organizers and creators of Occupy Minneapolis were volunteer collective of individuals that are standing in solidarity with the Occupy Movement and helped work to connect Minnesota with the Global Revolution Movement. They stand with the principles of both Occupy Wall Street and our local OccupyMN networks.

According to its website, the Occupy Movement is an "expansive network of individuals and groups working together to fight for economic justice in the face of rampant criminality on Wall Street and a government controlled by monied interests". The website states that "We, 'the 99%', are trying to wrestle government control out the hands of the '1%'. OccupyMN is a people's movement. It is leaderless and party-less by design. It is not a business, a political party, an advertising campaign or a brand. It is not for sale."

=== Continued organizing and resource-building through OccupyMN ===
OccupyMN describes the post-2011 period as a continuance by way of ongoing organizing structures, including working groups and networks, even after the physical occupation of The People's Plaza had ended. It also frames its mission as keeping locally relevant movement tools available and actively curated, and it describes those resources as later helping to support organizing around economic and racial justice issues, including Black Lives Matter, as well as participation in Minnesota protests following the murder of George Floyd.

A key part of that continuity, according to OccupyMN has been through the creation, maintenance, and distribution of practical guides for activism. Its current online public materials features a Community Defense Guide, a Street Medic Guide, and Online Security Guide, and a Prisoner Support Guide. The Community Defense guide describes itself as a vital resource for activists responding to the recent militarization of Immigrations and Customs Enforcement agents against both undocumented immigrants and American citizens alike, highlighting the murder of Renee Nicole Macklin Good. a 37 year old Minnesota resident. The Street Medic Guide describes street medics as volunteers providing first aid and support during actions, notes the importance of training, and directs readers to connect with local health collectives for ongoing preparation. The online Security Guide emphasize taking steps against mass surveillance and includes pointers to training and reference materials for individuals and organizations.

OccupyMN also presents long-running mutual support capacity through health-focused organizing. For example, its Street Medic Guide references the North Star Health Collective as created around the 2008 Republican National Convention in St. Paul, providing health care services and training, and continuing to provide support for a range of causes, including support during the Occupy Wall Street era in Minneapolis and beyond.

Finally, OccupyMN's accounts of its longer-term activity describe continued meetings and organizing during later periods, including winter months, using public spaces and community venues, and note that the physical occupation in Minneapolis ended due to governmental processes and enforcement of restrictions rather than an actual end to the organizing or overall movement itself.

== See also ==
- Occupy Homes
- Occupy Movement
- We are the 99%
- List of global Occupy protest locations
- 2011 United States public employee protests
- 2011 Wisconsin protests
- Dakota Access Pipeline protests
- George Floyd protests
- Operation Metro Surge
- Killing of Renée Good
- Killing of Alex Pretti
- January 23, 2026 Minnesota protests against ICE
