= Dre (given name) =

Name list

Dre is a given name. Notable people with the name include:

- Dre Allen (born 1975), American musician
- Dre Babinski (born 1985), American musician
- Dre Barnes, American football player
- Dré Bly (born 1977), American football player
- Dre Davis (born 2001), American basketball player
- Dre Fortune (born 1996), American-born Trinidadian footballer
- Dre Greenlaw (born 1997), American football player
- Dre Harris, American musician
- Dre Kirkpatrick (born 1989), American football player
- Dre Lyon, member of American music production duo Cool & Dre
- Dre Moon (born 1991), American musician
- Dre Moore (born 1985), American football player
- Dre Murray (born 1981), American rapper
- Dre Russ (born 1988), nickname of Jamaican cricketer Andre Russell
- Dré Saris (1921–1995), Dutch footballer
- Dré Steemans (1954–2009), Belgian TV and radio host
- Dré Thies (born 1967), American rower

== See also ==
- Dr. Dre, American record producer and rapper
- Doctor Dré, American radio and TV personality
- Dre Dog, American rapper
- Mac Dre, American rapper
- André, given name and surname
