= Government Plaza station =

Light rail station in Minneapolis, Minnesota

Government Plaza
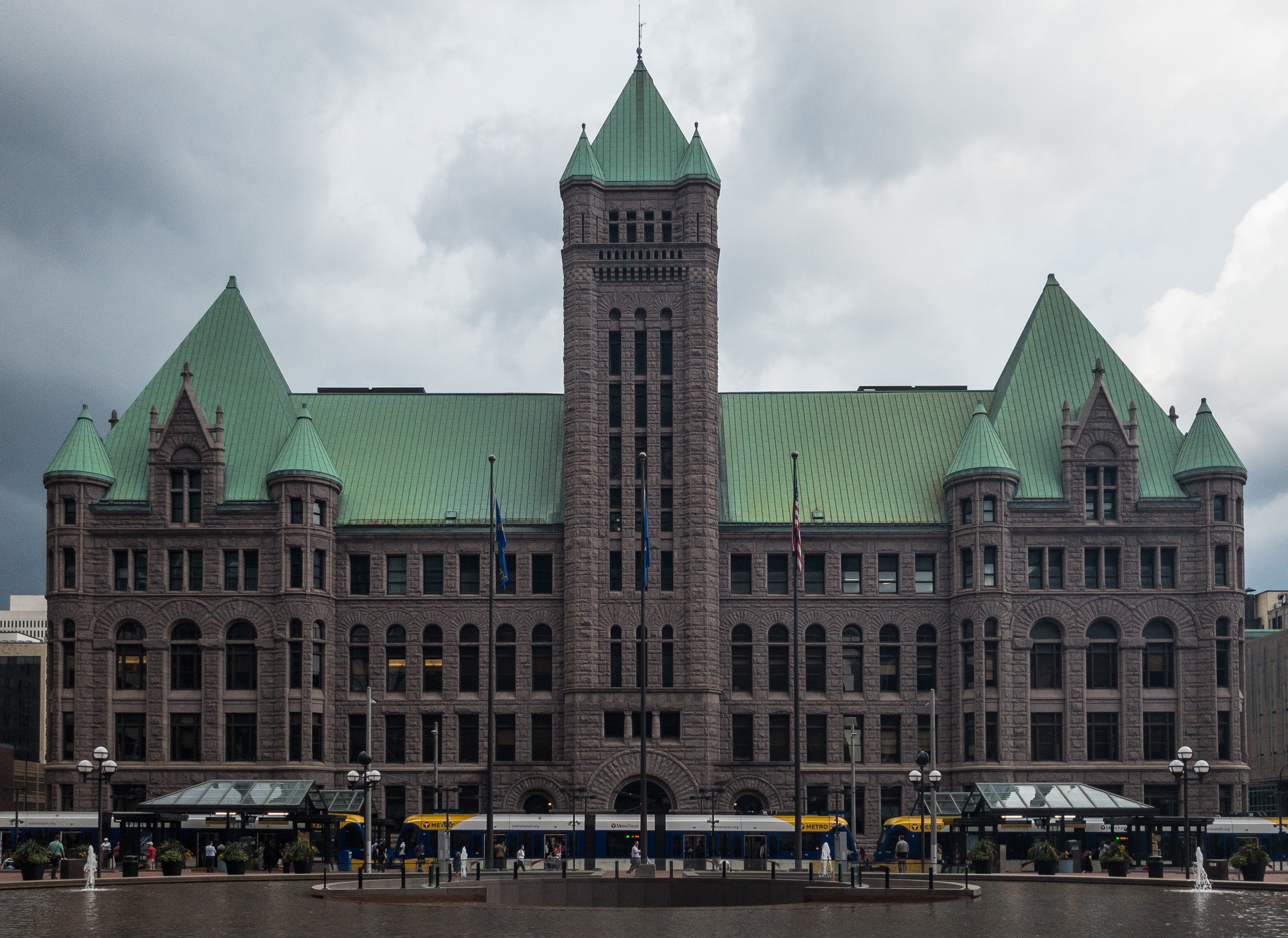
- Green Line train stopped at the station, with Minneapolis City Hall behind it.

General information
- Location: 352 South 5th Street; Minneapolis, Minnesota
- Coordinates: 44°58′36″N 93°15′57″W
- Owner: Metro Transit
- Platforms: 2 side platforms
- Tracks: 2
- Connections: Metro Transit: 3

Construction
- Structure type: At-grade
- Cycle facilities: Nice Ride stations
- Accessible: Yes
- Architect: Barbour LaDouceur Architects, Seitu Jones

Other information
- Station code: GOVT; 51424 (northbound/westbound); 51409 (southbound/eastbound)
- Fare zone: Downtown

History
- Opened: June 26, 2004
- Rebuilt: 2009

Passengers
- 2025: 1,333 daily ▼4.1%
- Rank: 12 out of 37

Services
Preceding station	Metro	Following station
Nicollet Mall toward Target Field	Blue Line	U.S. Bank Stadium toward Mall of America
Nicollet Mall toward Target Field	Green Line	U.S. Bank Stadium toward Saint Paul Union Depot
Location

Government Plaza station is a Metro light rail station on the Blue Line and Green Line in Minneapolis, Minnesota. The station is located on 5th Street South, between 3rd and 4th Avenues South in downtown Minneapolis. This station opened on June 26, 2004, with initial light rail service in the Twin Cities.

== History and design ==
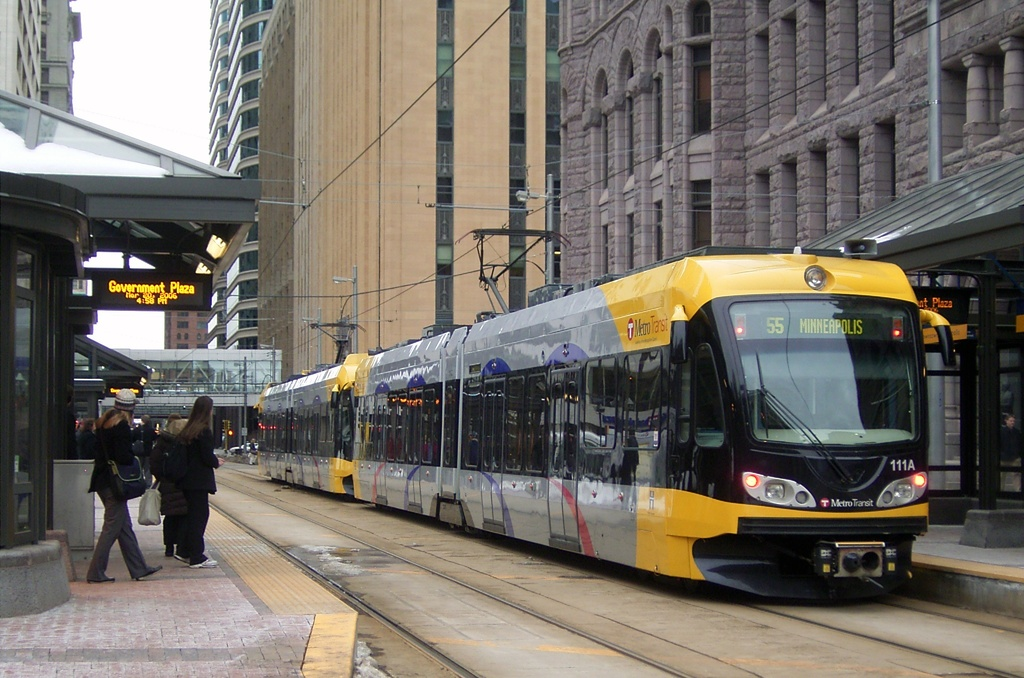
A Hiawatha Line train stopped at Government Plaza before platform lengthening.

In 1905, Twin Cities Rapid Transit (TCRT) streetcars began running on new track down 5th Street from Hennepin Avenue to 4th Avenue in order to relieve congestion on the High Street Loop. In 1920, TCRT's flagship Interurban between Downtown Minneapolis and Downtown Saint Paul, streetcar predecessor to the Green Line, was rerouted down 5th Street from Washington Avenue via 5th Avenue. Streetcars continued this routing through downtown and were converted to buses on November 28, 1953.

Fifth Avenue was converted to westward one-way traffic in the mid-1960s in conjunction with the construction of Interstate 94 and Interstate 35W. The westbound stop remained for Routes 16, a bus predecessor to the Green Line and replacement of the Interubran. Soon after the Metropolitan Transit Commission assumed TCRT's operations in 1970, the corridor would remain critical for westbound service from Saint Paul. In 1976 express bus service between downtowns was inaugurated along Interstate 94. In June 1998 limited-stop Route 50 began operating, supplementing Route 16 during rush hours. In order to compensate for the loss of westbound bus traffic on 5th Street at the beginning of light rail construction, a contraflow bus lane was placed one block north on 4th Street South. Construction of the downtown stations began summer 2002. Service began at this station when the first phase of the Hiawatha Line, now the Blue Line, opened on June 26, 2004. Additional light rail service commenced June 14, 2014, with opening of the Green Line to Saint Paul.

The station was designed by Barbour LaDouceur Architects, with Seitu Jones serving as architectural design team artist. In response to historic preservation concerns wanting to retain sightlines of Minneapolis City Hall from the adjacent street and plaza, particularly the Richardsonian Romanesque facade and arched entrance, the shelters at this station are spaced widely apart at each end of the long platforms. Surrounding architecture influenced the station's design. For shelters, stone bases match that of City Hall's red granite and the canopies' exposed truss beam design was inspired by the nearby Milwaukee Road Depot train shed. Semicircular enclosures are oriented towards the direction of travel. Platform brickwork is continuous with the adjoining plaza.

Side platforms extend into the sidewalk, closing off 5th Street to vehicle traffic. This is the only segment of the light rail along 5th Street with no vehicle traffic adjacent to the tracks. Government Plaza was the only downtown station that could not accommodate 3-car long trains, only being built for a maximum of 2-cars. The platform was lengthened from 200 feet (61 m) to 300 feet (91 m) the weekend of June 26, 2009.

The Green Line Night Bus and rail replacement buses serve regular bus stops at 5th Street, the westbound stop is adjacent on 4th Avenue with the eastbound stop one block away on 5th Avenue.

== Public art ==
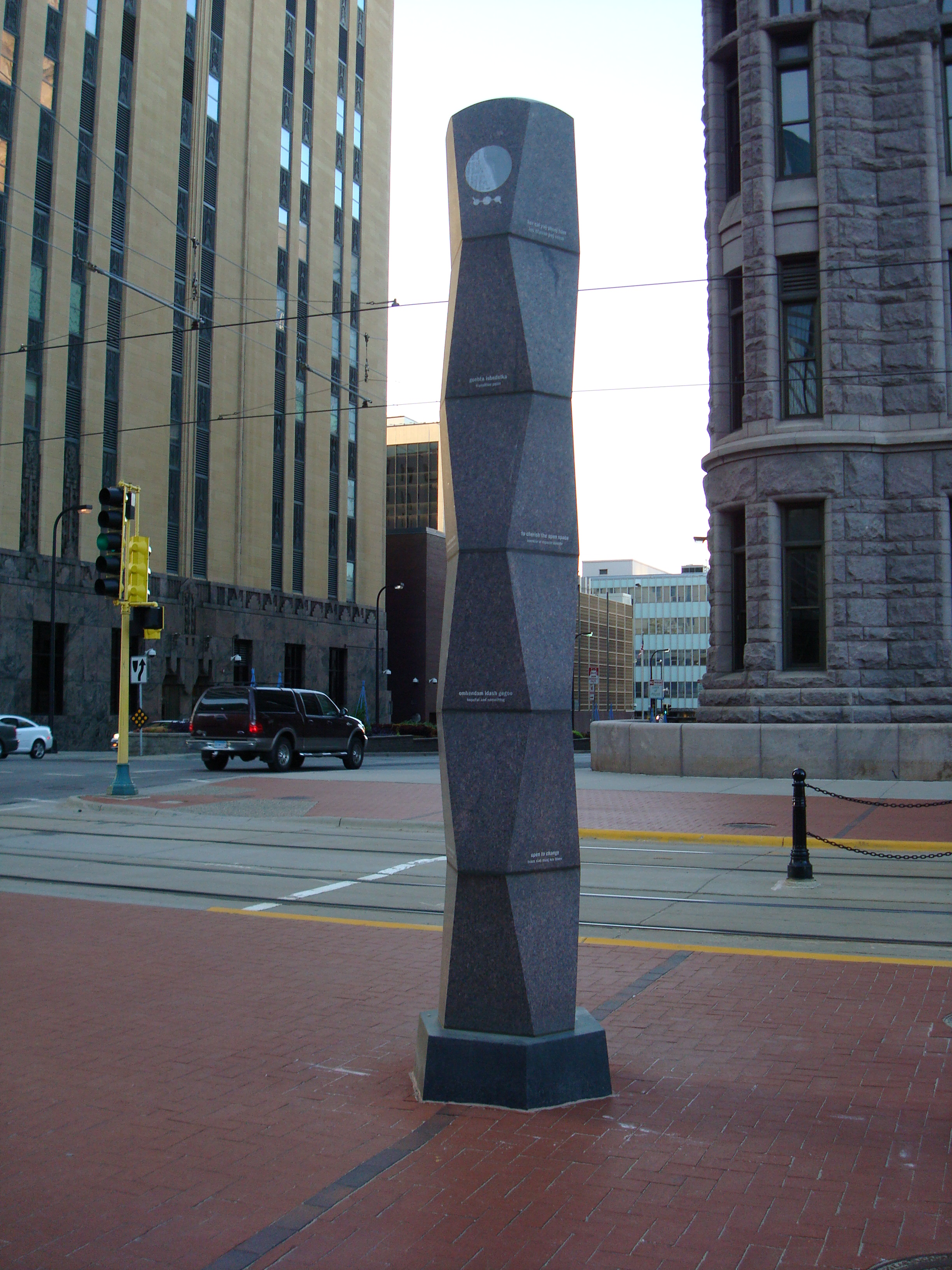
North column of Local Connections: Minneapolis Views and Visions of Democracy.

The public art installation, Local Connections: Minneapolis Views and Visions of Democracy, by Keith Christensen, features two granite columns roughly demarcating the boundary between the southbound platform and the plaza. The artwork also consists of eight printed images, two in each shelter, on two-sided panels of enameled glass. Images are either of different work gloves, solicited from community residents and workers, or aerial photography, historic and contemporary, of Minneapolis neighborhoods. The gloves allude to diverse population and democracy in work. Aerials contextualize how local activities fit into a larger scale. Phrases accompanying the columns and images pertain to community and civic engagement, and are translated into five languages common to Minneapolis: English, Spanish, Somali, Hmong, and Ojibwe.

Small Kindness, Weather Permitting, by Janet Zweig, has four interactive boxes at the station: All the way around! #17, Ring the bell and see. #18, Go ahead and let it snow. #23, and Open the curtains please. #27.

== Notable places nearby ==
The station is surrounded by a high concentration of government buildings, suggestive of its name: Minneapolis City Hall, Hennepin County Government Center, Minneapolis Federal Courthouse, Hennepin County Public Safety Facility, and, most recently, Minneapolis Public Service Building. Directly adjoining the southbound platform is The People's Plaza. The Minneapolis Skyway System can be accessed from City Hall or Government Center, and a rare underground portion of the system runs beneath the station.

Landmarks nearby include CenturyLink Building, U.S. Bank Plaza, and Capella Tower.

Two and three blocks away are connections to the C Line and D Line at 7th–8th Street & 3rd/4th Avenue.

== Gallery ==
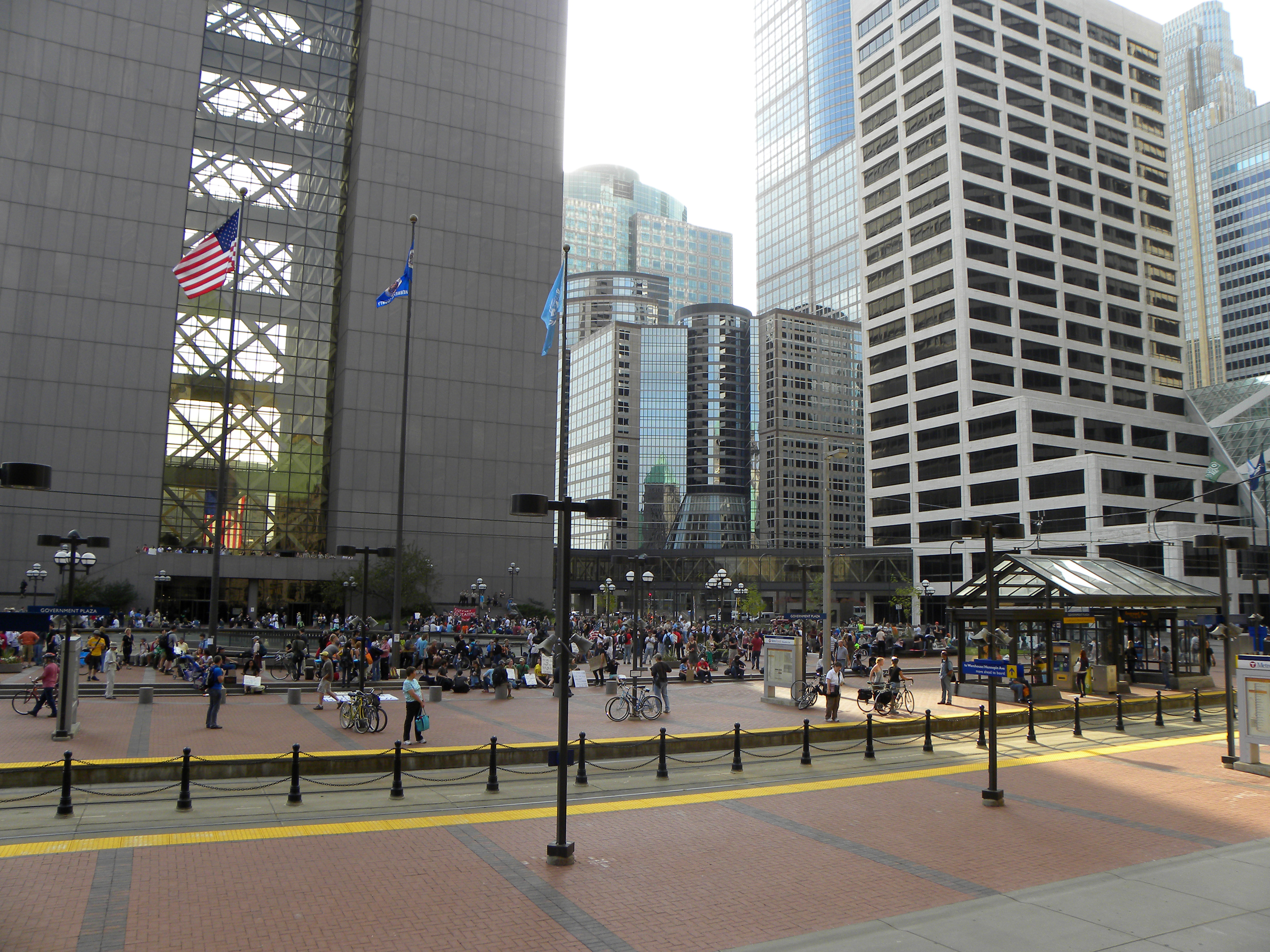
The light rail station with Occupy Minneapolis at The People's Plaza in the background.

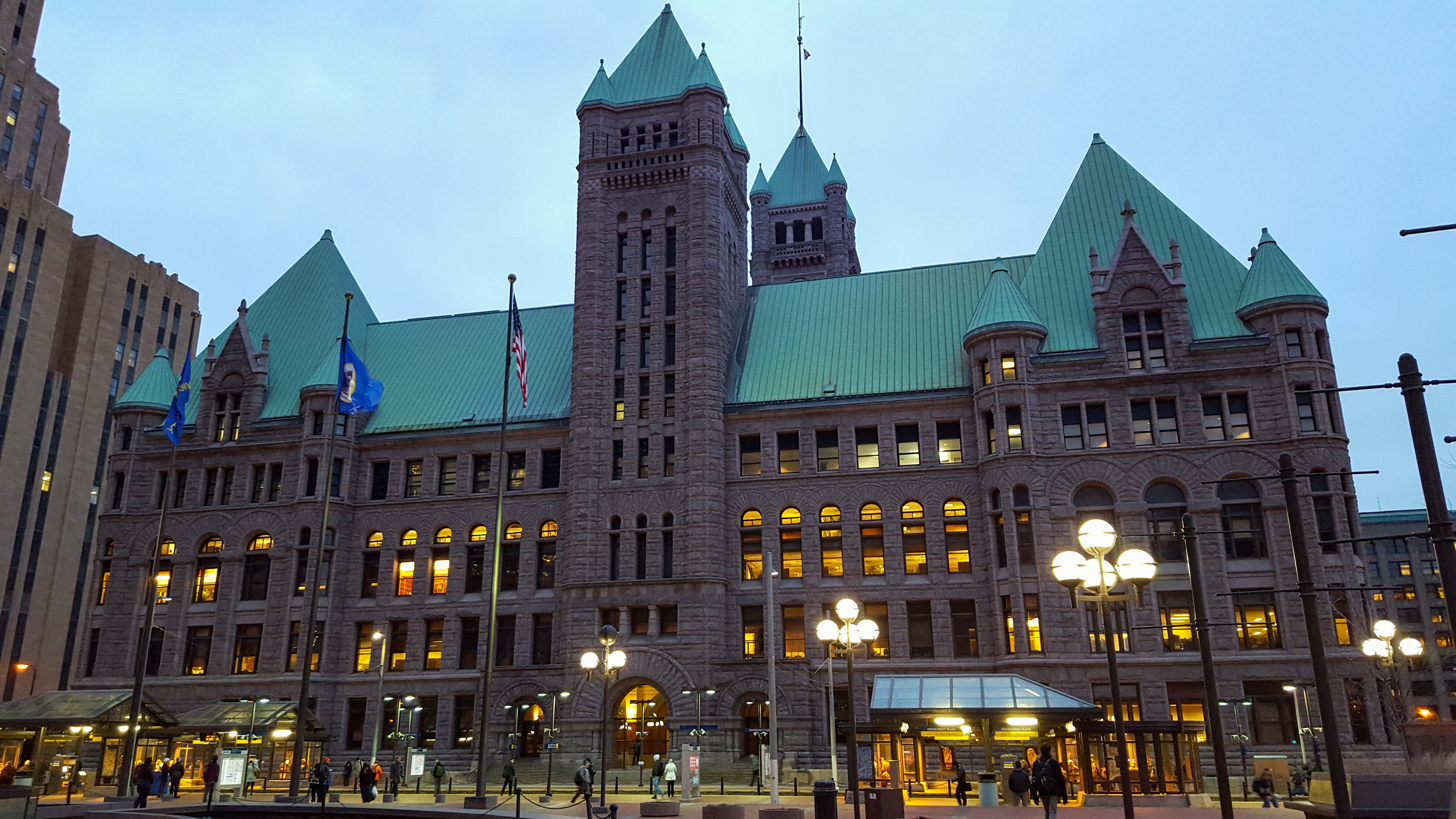
Station lighting at dusk.

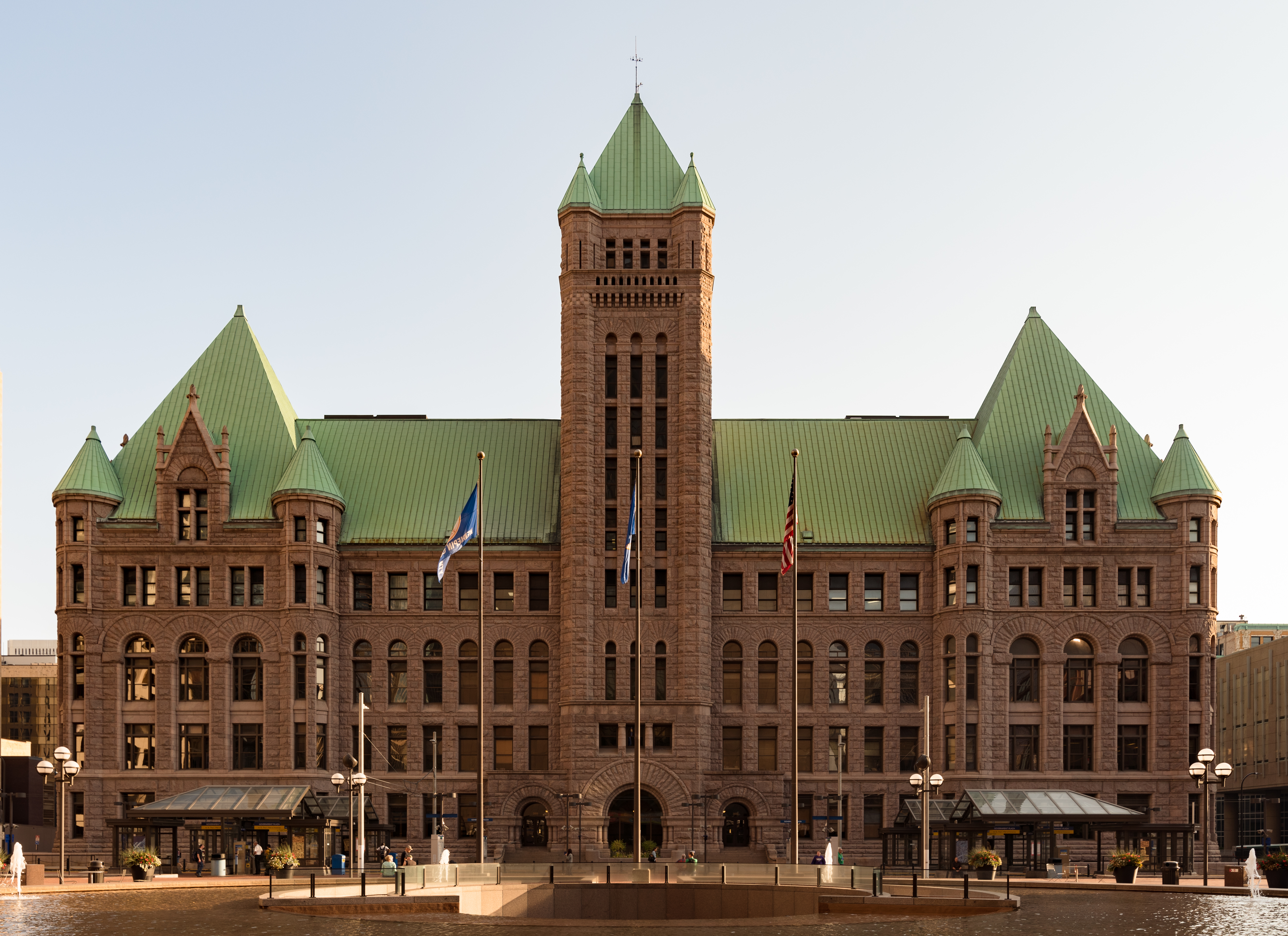
The station's design preserves the view of Minneapolis City Hall, an ornate Richardsonian Romanesque design.

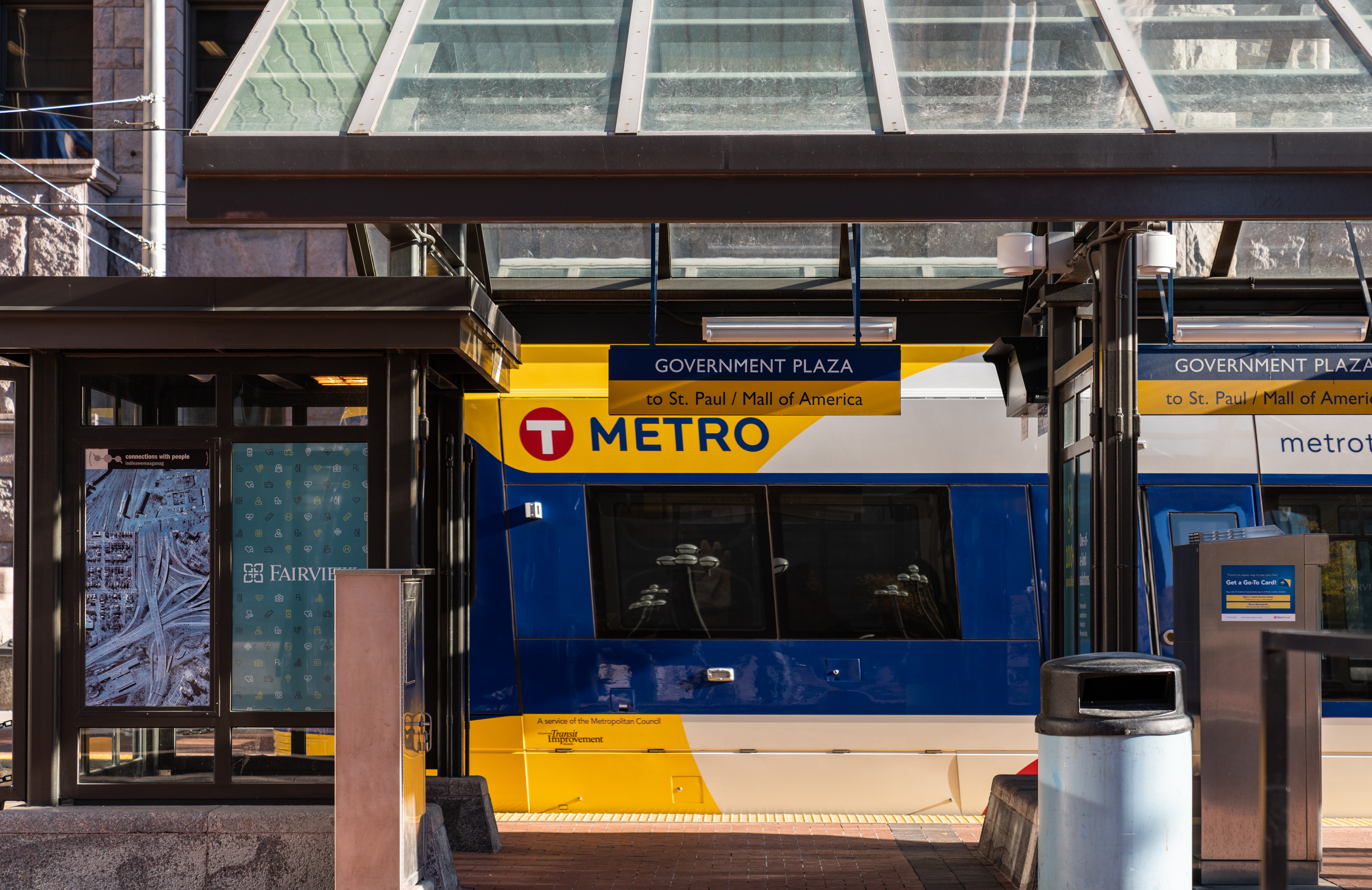
Detail of a shelter.

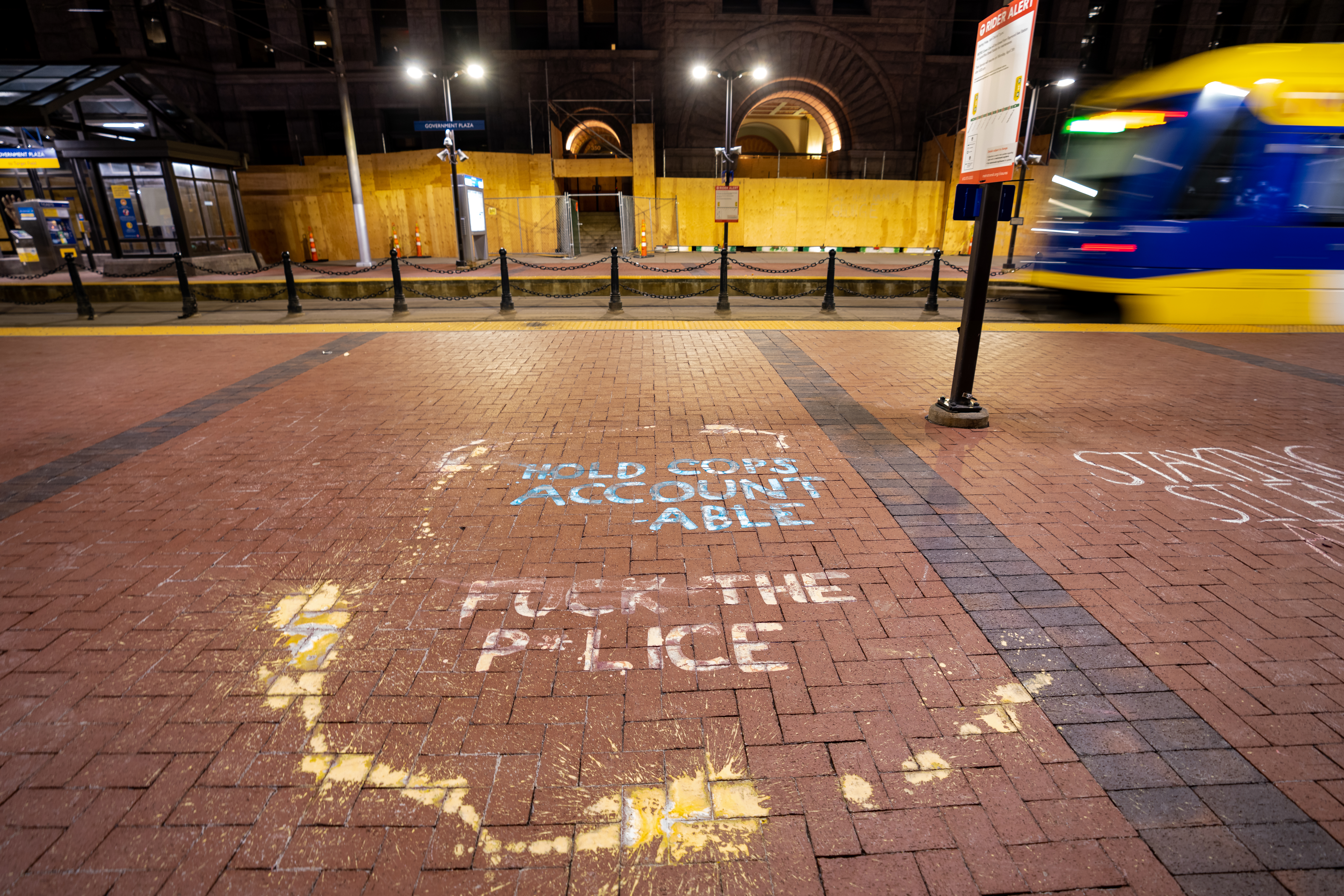
Chalk graffiti on the platform during the Trial of Derek Chauvin in the murder of George Floyd.

== See also ==
- Capitol/Rice Street, a Green Line light rail station in Saint Paul concentrated around the Minnesota State Capitol complex.
