= Pence Opera House =

Former theater in Minneapolis, Minnesota, United States

Coordinates: 44°59′0″N 93°16′4″W

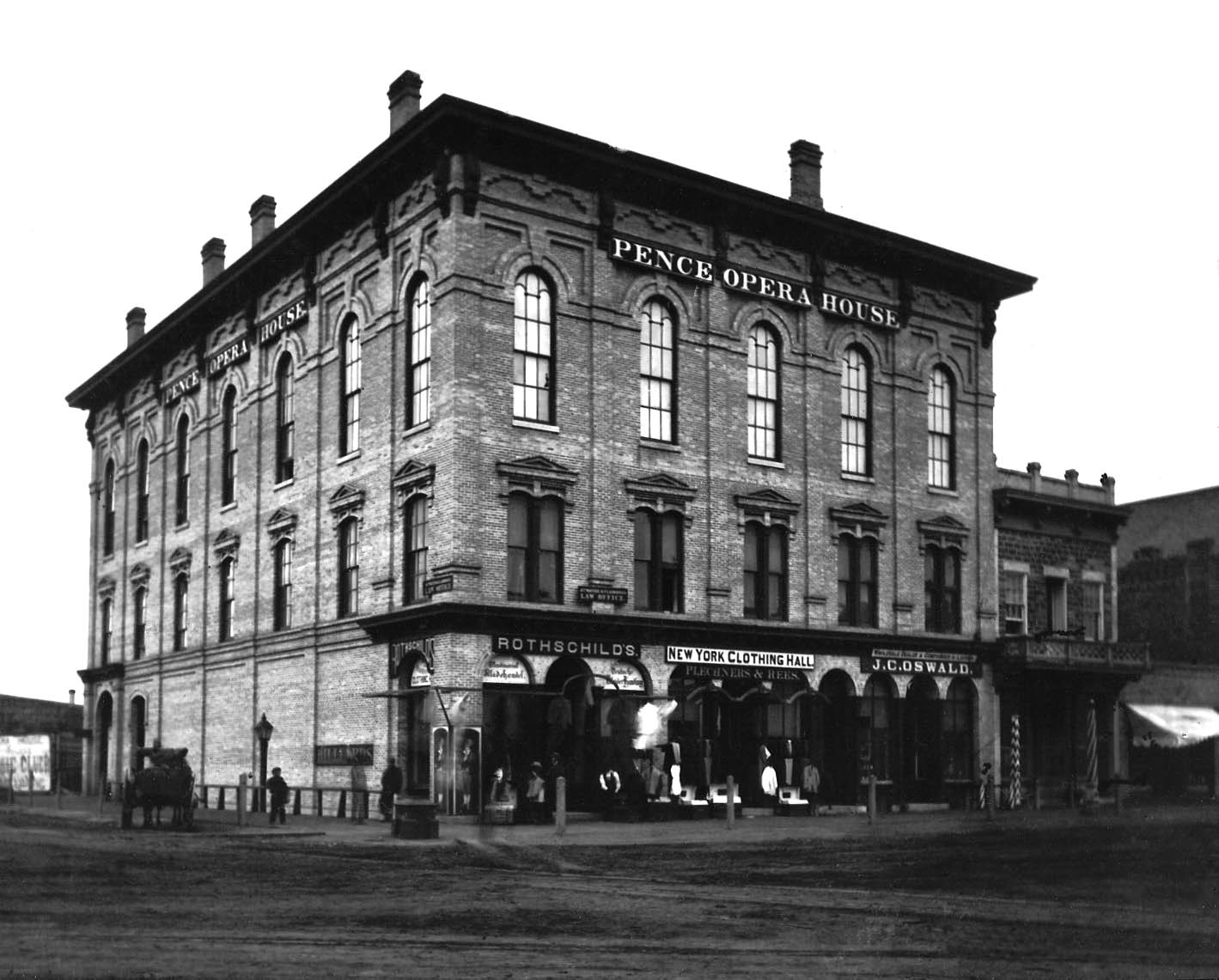
- Pence Opera House in 1870
- Interactive map of Pence Opera House
- Address: Hennepin Avenue and 2nd Street
- Location: Minneapolis, Minnesota
- Capacity: 700-900
- Type: Opera house

Construction
- Opened: June 21, 1867; 159 years ago
- Demolished: 1952

The Pence Opera House was an opera house and later, a mission, at Hennepin Avenue and 2nd Street in Minneapolis, Minnesota, United States.

The theater was named for its owner and chief funder, John Wesley Pence, a financier originally from Ohio, and was designed by architect Abraham M. Radcliffe. Though sometimes called the first theater in Minneapolis, it was actually built eight years after the first known theater in the city, Harrison's Hall. During construction, the building was struck by lightning, which was called "an act of God's retribution" by a local minister in his Sunday sermon that week. Soon afterwards, the minister's church was also struck by lightning. The Opera House was opened in 1867 with a seating capacity of 700. The three-story building housed shops on its first floor, offices on its second, a billiard parlor in the basement, and the theater on the third. In 1879, the theater was remodeled and increased its capacity to 900. Along with the St. Paul Opera House, it was one of the first music venues in the Twin Cities, joined in 1872 by the larger Academy of Music.

The theater opened on June 21, 1867, with a performance of Sheridan Knowles' play The Hunchback, attended by Governor William Marshall and Sen. Alexander Ramsey. Performances at the Pence included musicians such as Norwegian violinist Ole Bull, vaudeville and minstrel shows, and plays such as The Rivals, Our American Cousin, and Shakespearian works including Richard III.

In its early years, the theater was one of the city's major gathering places, but was overshadowed by the opening of the Academy of Music and struggled thereafter. In the 1890s and early 1900s, the theater was empty and unused, and the building grew dilapidated. It became a rooming house in the early 1900s, then a mission in 1915. The building was razed in 1952.

Before the construction of the original Minneapolis City Hall in 1873, city government officials worked out of rented space in the Pence Opera House building.
