= Hennepin County Law Library =

Law library in Minnesota, US

Coordinates: 44.975848°N 93.266339°W

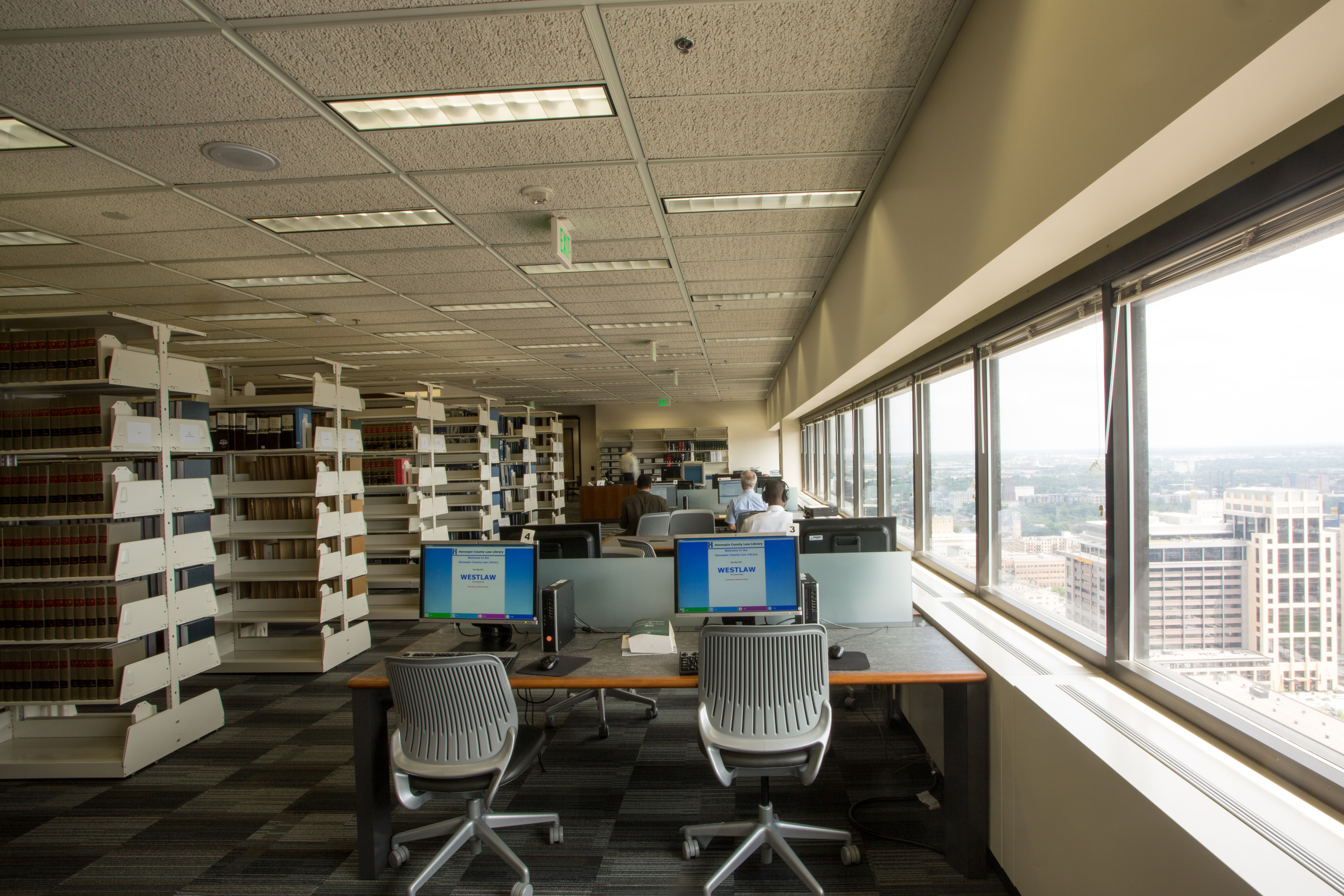
The space was renovated in the summer of 2016.

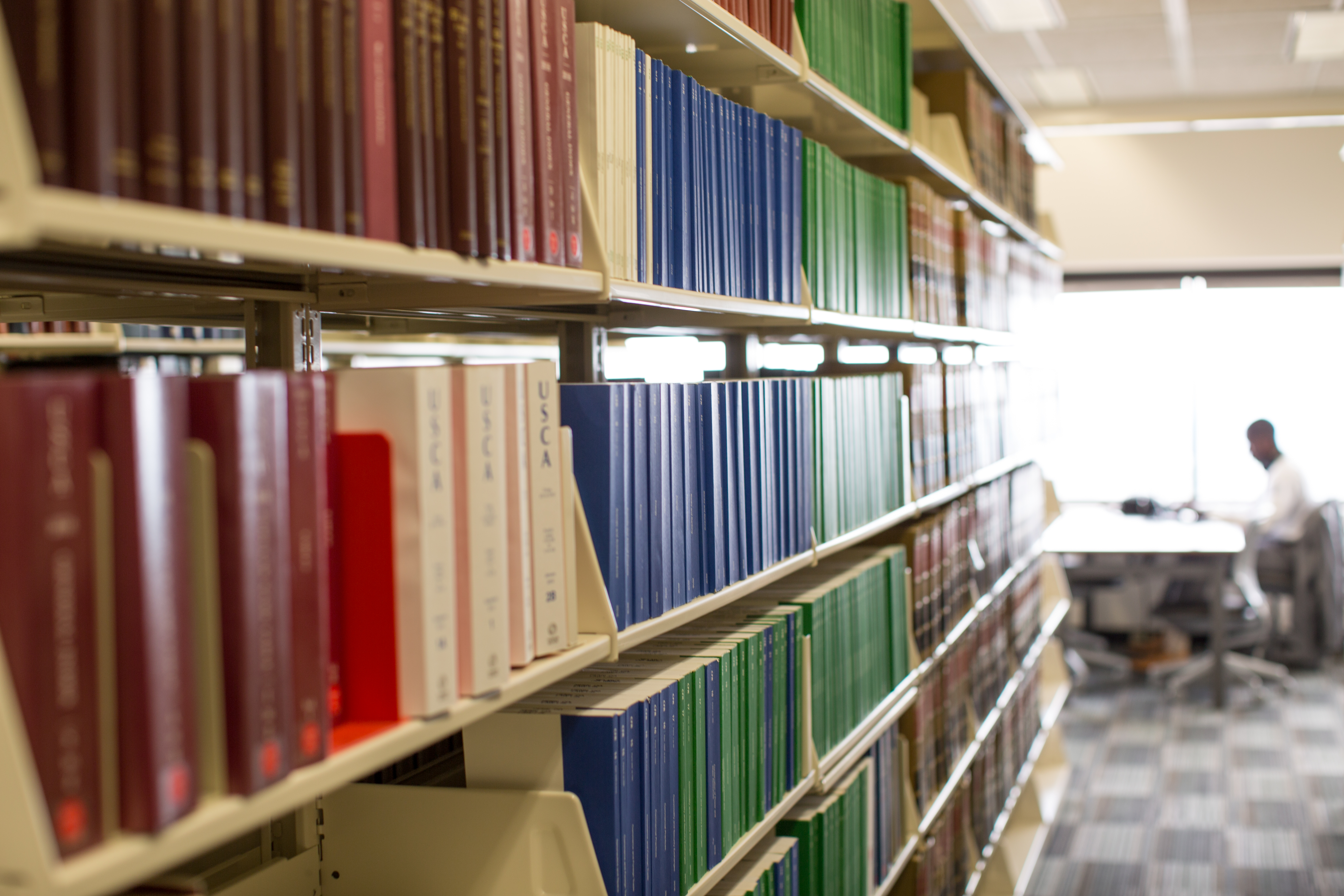
The space was renovated in the summer of 2016.

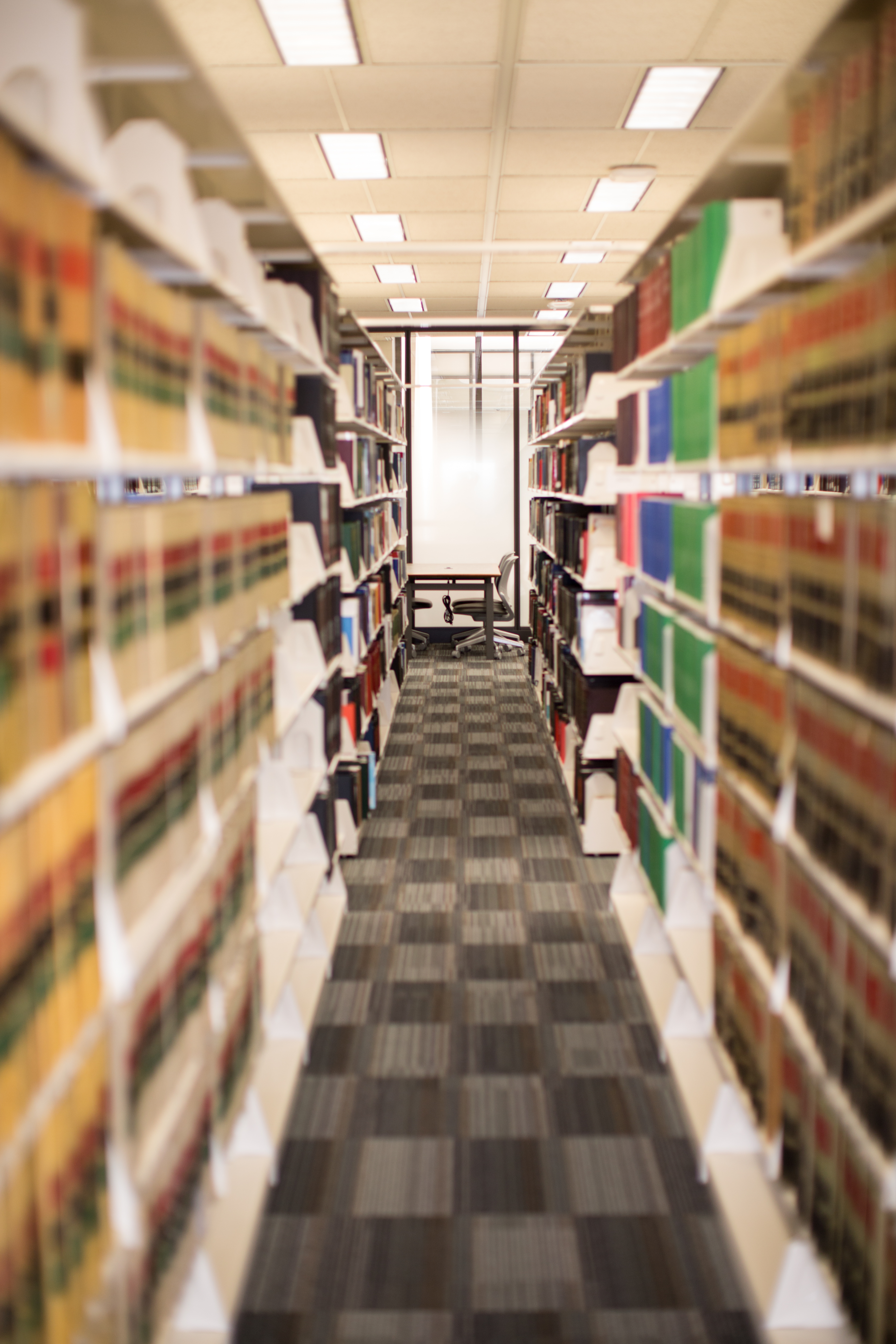
The space was renovated in the summer of 2016.

The Hennepin County Law Library is a law library located in Minneapolis, Minnesota, founded in 1883.

== Organization and governance ==
The Hennepin County Law Library is organized under Chapter 134A of the Minnesota Statutes. The governing agency is a seven-member Board of Trustees consisting of three judges of the Fourth Judicial District, three practicing attorneys, and a member of the Hennepin County Board of Commissioners. The library, which is open to the public, is funded by a combination of court fees, user fees, and an appropriation from the Hennepin County general revenue fund.

== History ==
The Hennepin County Law Library had its origin when the Minneapolis Bar Association incorporated on February 20, 1883. The Bar Association was a stock corporation that allowed members to pay for stock by contributing books, the value of which was determined by an appraisal committee. The law library's first location was a room on the second floor of a building on Nicollet Avenue adjoining the First National Bank at Washington Avenue. In August 1883 the collection was moved to the Academy of Music Building, at the corner of Washington and Hennepin Avenues. This magnificent building, a showplace for the arts and the center of the city's entertainment district, was gutted by fire on Christmas Day, 1884. The law library was completely destroyed. With the insurance proceeds of $15,000, the Bar Association began rebuilding the law library, which opened in the Boston Block on May 1, 1885. This was another famous building that boasted the first indoor court in Minneapolis. But in April 1886, it was also struck by fire, destroying the law library for a second time. With the insurance of $20,000, a third law library was established in the Temple Court building, which occupied the site of the former Academy of Music Building. By 1895 the law library contained about 7,000 volumes. In 1903 it was provided accommodations in Room 434 of the new Court House and City Hall building. In 1960 the law library moved to Room 318, where it remained until its move in September 1976 to its present location in the Hennepin County Government Center.

The law library is named for Anne W. Grande, who served as law librarian for 33 years, from 1975 to 2008.

The law library was renovated in the summer of 2016.

== Staff ==
According to a 1941 Hennepin Lawyer article by Thomas Kneeland, one of the incorporators of the Minneapolis Bar Association, the Bar Association employed three librarians during the time it owned the law library. Kneeland listed the first as Edward S. Waters, though a newspaper article on December 26, 1884, in the Minneapolis Evening Journal stated that F. S. Gaylord was the librarian at the time of the Christmas Day fire. The History of the Bench and Bar of Minnesota, by Hiram F. Stevens (Minneapolis: Legal Publishing and Engraving Co., 1904) lists E.S. Waters as Treasurer of the Minneapolis Bar Association in 1904. Kneeland listed the second librarian as Frederic Klapp, who was succeeded in 1921 by his son, S. D. Kapp, who served until his death in 1937. Hennepin County law librarians include Lillian W. Taylor (1937–1944), Buelah C. Blaisdell (1944–1948), Ethel Kommes (1948–1975), Anne Grande (1975–2008), Ed Carroll (2008–2015), Karen Westwood (2015–current).
