= Drug Recognition Expert =

Law enforcement officer trained to identify people whose driving is impaired by drugs

A Drug Recognition Expert (DRE) is a law enforcement officer trained in a 12 step process to identify people whose driving is impaired by drugs other than, or in addition to, alcohol. All DREs follow the same 12 step procedure called a Drug Influence Evaluation (DIE), to purportedly determine which category of drugs is causing the driver to be impaired.

If a DRE determines that a driver was too impaired to operate a vehicle in a safe manner, they will look for indications of the drugs suspected, by the common perceivable effects the drugs have on the human body. There are seven categories of classifications a DRE is looking for, including; central nervous system depressants, CNS stimulants, dissociative anesthetics, cannabis, hallucinogens, inhalants, and narcotic analgesics.

DREs often testify in court, where the term "expert" has important legal implications. The Traffic Resource for Judges describes different approaches taken by state courts in how DRE evidence is admitted.

Different jurisdictions take a variety of approaches to DRE testimony. Some jurisdictions hold DRE protocol and evidence to be scientific evidence; some do not. Some jurisdictions permit DRE testimony to be introduced as expert testimony (usually under Rule of Evidence 702 or the equivalent in that state), while some jurisdiction require DRE testimony to be introduced as non-expert opinion testimony. Some jurisdictions analyze DRE testimony through the lens of Daubert, while other jurisdictions use the Frye analysis.

The acronym 'DRE' has been used to refer not just to the DRE officers, but also to the examination they perform, the "Drug Recognition Examination", or "Drug Recognition Evaluation." The confluence of acronyms leads to confusion, and the IACP now calls the evaluation done by DRE officers the "Drug Influence Evaluation", DIE.

DREs were developed by police officers from the Los Angeles Police Department in the early 1970s. The officers' drug recognition methods were officially recognized by the LAPD management in 1979, and adopted by the National Highway Traffic Safety Administration in the early 1980s.

Certification is issued by the International Association of Chiefs of Police (IACP). To remain certified and in good standing, DREs must track their evaluations and enter the results into an online database.

== DRE training ==
DRE training and certification standards are defined by the International Association of Chiefs of Police Training is available only to "a person ... in the employ and under the direct control of a public criminal justice agency involved in the enforcement of criminal or traffic safety laws or an institution involved in providing training services to officers of law enforcement agencies.". IACP standards require DREs training to be done using an official Student Manual. This manual. is widely cited in court as defining standards for the performance of a Drug Influence Evaluation.

== 12-Step DRE process ==
A DIE involves the following 12 steps

1. Breath Alcohol Test: The arresting officer reviews the subject's breath alcohol concentration (BrAC) test results and determines if the subject's apparent impairment is consistent with the subject's BrAC. If so, the officer will not normally call a DRE. If the impairment is not explained by the BrAC, the officer requests a DRE evaluation.
2. Interview of the arresting officer
3. Preliminary examination and first pulse
4. Eye examinations
5. Divided Attention Psychophysical Tests
6. Vital signs and second pulse
7. Dark room examinations
8. Examination for muscle tone
9. Check for injection sites and third pulse
10. Subject's Statements and Other Observations
11. Analysis and Opinions of the Evaluator
12. Toxicological examination: After completing the evaluation, the DRE normally requests a urine, blood and/or saliva sample from the subject for a toxicology lab analysis.

== Critique & Controversy ==
=== Scientific validation ===
Claims regarding the effectiveness of DREs have not been supported by research. These claims are critical to the admission of DRE expert testimony in criminal trials.

The DRE Student Manual identifies three scientific studies as being those that validate DRE testing. These studies are: Bigelow 1985 (a.k.a. the Johns Hopkins study); Compton 1986 (a.k.a. the LAPD-173 study); and Adler 1994 (a.k.a. the Arizona DRE Validation Study). However, all three of these studies have been shown to have major methodological flaws.

=== Admissibility ===
In 2017, the Supreme Court of Canada held that "a DRE is a 'drug recognition expert', certified as such for the purposes of the 12 step evaluation. By reason of his training and experience, a DRE undoubtedly possesses expertise on determining drug impairment that is outside the experience and knowledge of the trier of fact. He is thus an expert for the purpose of applying the 12 step evaluation and determining whether that evaluation indicates drug impairment. His expertise has been conclusively and irrebuttably established by Parliament. Knowledge of the underlying science is not a precondition to the admissibility of a DRE’s opinion."

This mirrors US case law where testimony of police officers regarding alcohol impairment is admitted in court without the need for the officer to be an expert in, or to testify to, the underlying sciences of the sobriety tests they are trained to administer.

=== Police Handing Out Drugs ===
On May 2, 2012, activists with Occupy Minneapolis released a documentary video called MK Occupy Minnesota. The video documents testimony from participants that police officers in Minneapolis gave them cannabis as part of a Drug Recognition Expert program.

== See also ==
- Drug test
- Occupy Minneapolis
