= Dré Saris =

Dutch footballer (1920–2005)

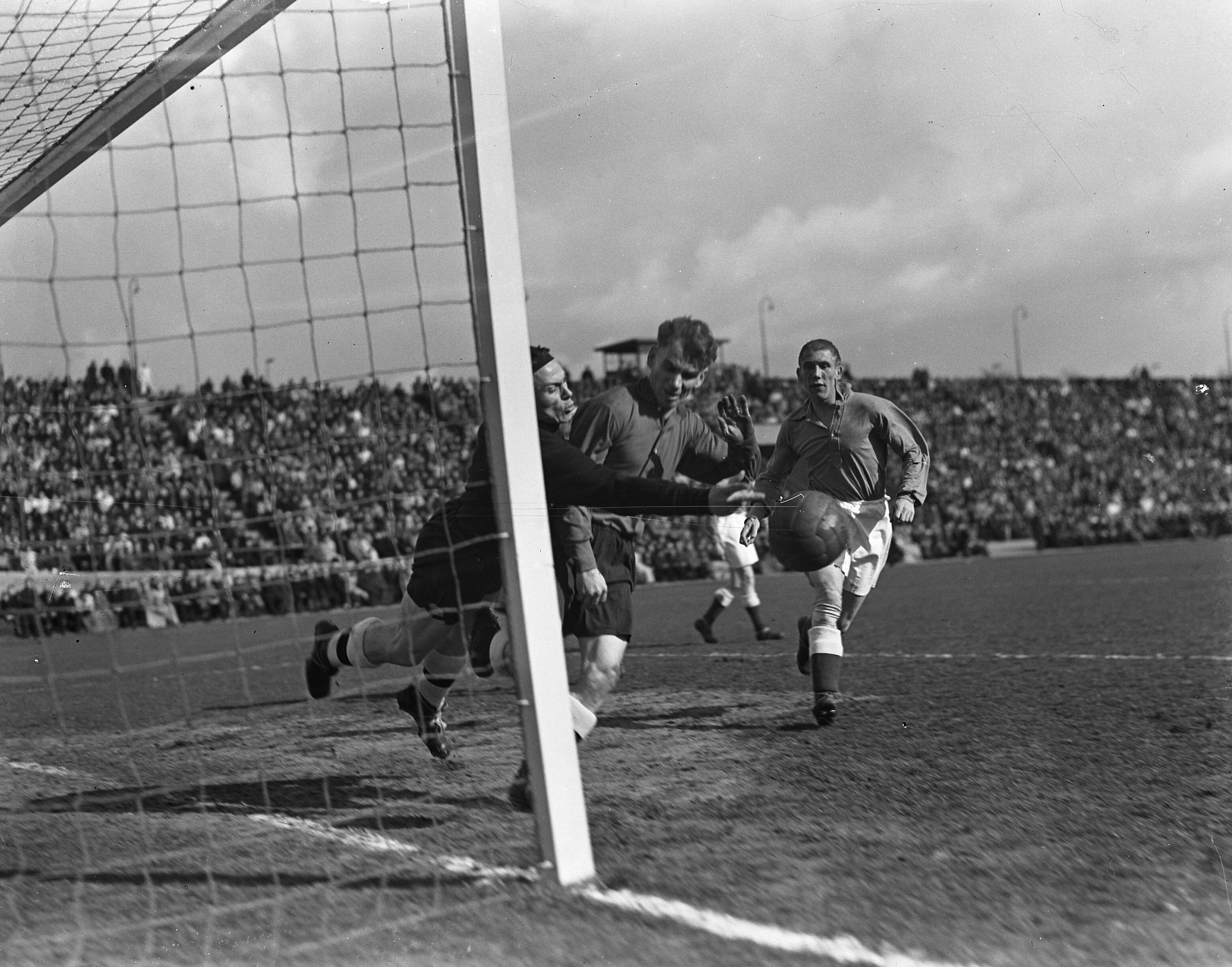
- Saris (1949)

Personal information
- Full name: Andries Johannes Saris
- Date of birth: 19 June 1920
- Place of birth: 's-Hertogenbosch, Netherlands
- Date of death: 14 June 2005 (aged 83)
- Place of death: 's-Hertogenbosch, Netherlands
- Position: Goalkeeper

Senior career*
Years	Team	Apps	(Gls)
1938–1958	BVV		

International career
1949	Netherlands	1	(0)
- * Club domestic league appearances and goals

Dré Saris (19 June 1920 – 14 June 2005) was a Dutch footballer played as a goalkeeper for BVV from 1938 until 1958. He made one match for the Netherlands national team in 1949.
