= Hennepin County Government Center =

Government building in Minneapolis

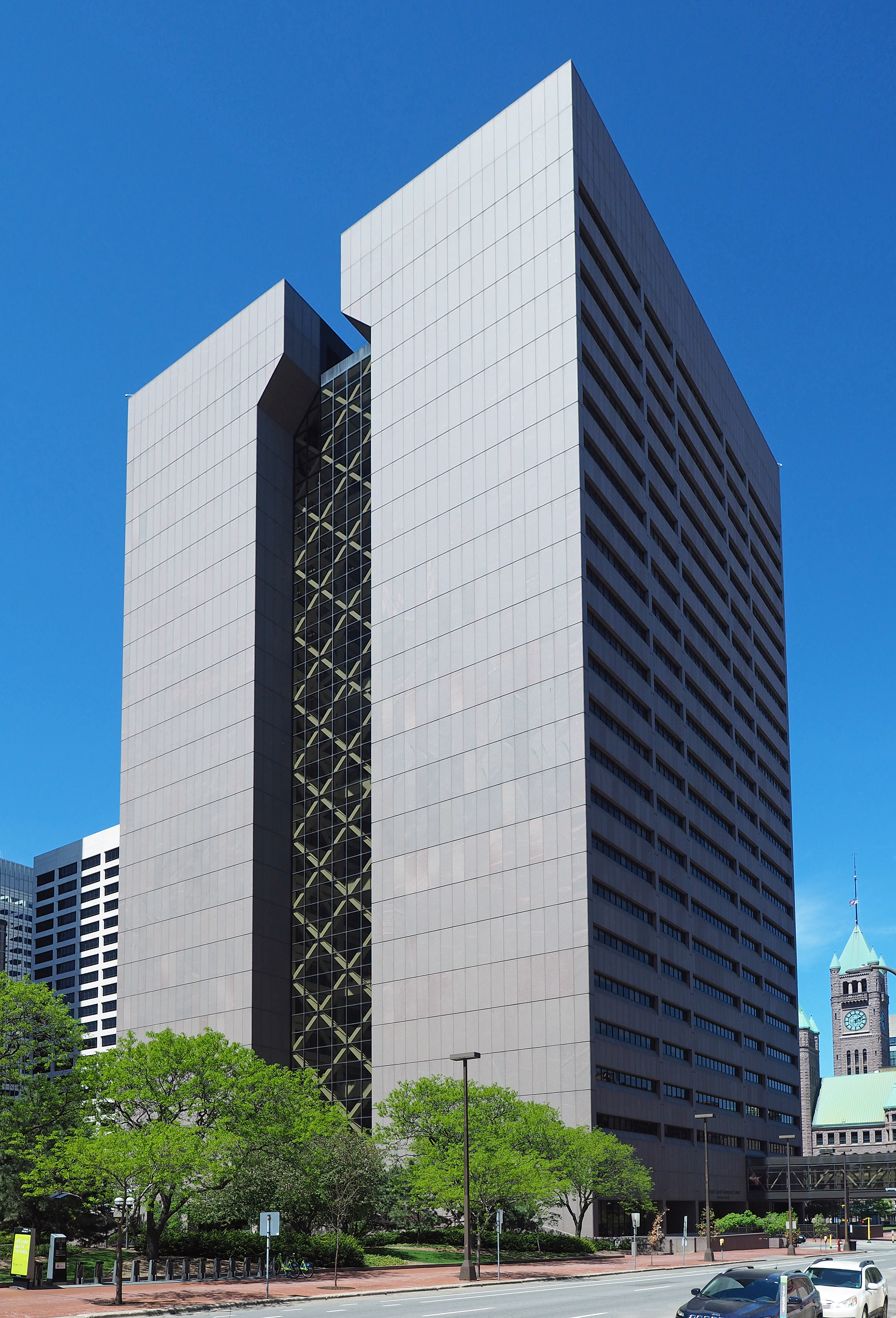
- Hennepin County Government Center viewed from the south
- Interactive map of the Hennepin County Government Center area

General information
- Location: Minneapolis, Minnesota, U.S.
- Coordinates: 44°58′33″N 93°16′0″W
- Construction started: 1969
- Completed: 1974

Height
- Height: 403 feet (123 meters)

Technical details
- Floor count: 24

Design and construction
- Architecture firm: Warnecke & Associates

Hennepin County Government Center is the courthouse and primary county government administration building for Hennepin County in the U.S. state of Minnesota. It is located in downtown Minneapolis, the county seat of Hennepin County. Before its construction, the Hennepin County government offices were housed in the Minneapolis City Hall-Hennepin County Courthouse. The building was opened in 1974 and occupied in stages in 1975.

== Building ==
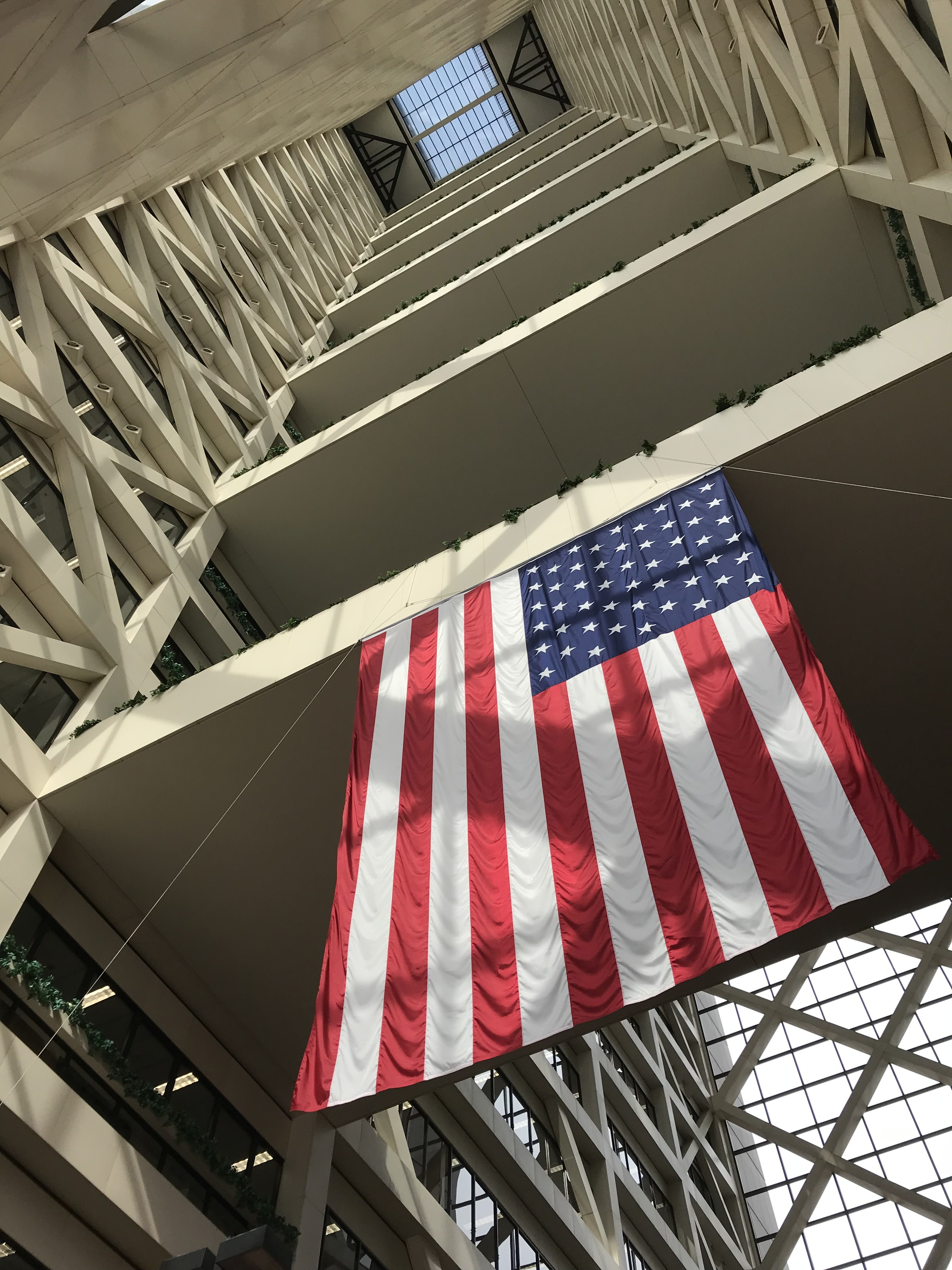
Looking up while in the atrium separating the two halves of the tower.

The building was designed by the architectural firm of John Carl Warnecke & Associates. It was dedicated in 1973 and completed in 1977. It is 403 feet (123 m) tall and has 24 stories. When viewed from the northeast or southwest sides, it takes on the appearance of a stylized letter H. This shape serves as the logo of Hennepin County. Each side of the "H" is a separate tower. The towers are connected by catwalk bridges on several floors. The whole is enclosed by glass windows to form an atrium. In early 2015 remodeling was done on the skyway-level public area, which now features new seating, high-top tables with electrical outlets, lighting and flat screen TVs.

The southeast side is known as the court tower. It houses courtrooms, county attorney offices, and the Hennepin County Law Library. The northwest side houses county administrative offices such as social services and county records.

== Location ==
The Hennepin County Government Center is built over 6th Street using the air rights over the street, which enabled two large plazas to be built in the city blocks.

It is connected by a tunnel to the Minneapolis City Hall, underneath 5th Street and the METRO Blue and Green lines. The Government Plaza METRO station is between the two buildings. The tunnel also connects to the federal courthouse for the United States District Court for the District of Minnesota.

The building has a skyway link to the US Bank Plaza Building (formerly Pillsbury Center). The link to the Thrivent (formerly Lutheran Brotherhood) headquarters building was closed in June 2018 due to demolition of an adjacent parking ramp and planned construction of a new Minneapolis public service center.

There is a separate secure tunnel to the Hennepin County Public Safety Facility (jail) located diagonally across the plaza.

== History ==
Before its construction, the Hennepin County government offices were housed in the Minneapolis City Hall-Hennepin County Courthouse.

After earlier suicides by jumping from the catwalk bridges, 10-foot high plexiglass wall panels were added to the bridges & balconies throughout the building in the 1980s.

Following a deadly shooting within the court tower in 2003, new security measures were implemented. New metal detectors were installed, along with X-ray equipment. The 2nd-floor lobby service desks at the skyway level were re-configured to accommodate the changes.

== See also ==
- List of tallest buildings in Minneapolis
