= Laura Dre =

German-Filipina singer producer

- Born: Laura-Beatrix Drezewski; 27 June 1982 (age 44); Germany
- Education: University of West London
- Genres: Synthwave, Synth-pop
- Years active: 2009–present
- Website: lauradre.com

Laura-Beatrix Drezewski (born 27 June 1982), better known as Laura Dre, is a German-Filipina singer-songwriter and record producer. Her style covers various genres of electronic music, with lyrics mainly in English. Having previously been part of various bands, Dre is now active as a solo artist in the synthwave scene since 2021.

== Early life ==
Dre was born and raised in Germany. She grew up with the music of the 1980s, including Depeche Mode, Cyndi Lauper and New Order. At the age of 12 she got her first guitar. According to Dre's statements, she was particularly inspired to form her own band by Shirley Manson, frontwoman of the rock band Garbage. From 2003 onwards, Dre's focus on electronic music was influenced by bands and artists such as Stereo Total, MiA., Peaches, Fischerspooner, Goldfrapp, Yppah and NYPC.

After completing her Abitur, Dre moved to Los Angeles and became bass player in a metal and pop rock band for two and a half years. In 2008, Dre moved to the United Kingdom, where she worked as a project manager and later as a police officer in London.

== Career ==
In 2009, Dre began her musical career as front woman of the British electropunk band Vinyl Black Stilettos. The band had international gigs, for example in 2012 at the L‑Beach festival with about 4,000 visitors. After 2012, the band regrouped under the name Vinyl Blackk. They had their last gig in 2015.

From 2016 to 2019, Dre studied music production at the University of West London. As a passionate Star Trek fan, Dre formed the synth-punk band Intergalactic Officers of Evil together with two other Trekkies she met during her studies. After her degree, Dre concentrated on her solo career and contracted with the record label Outland Recordings. In 2021, Dre released her solo debut album Moving Spaces. Dre's work and album have been reviewed in Clash, Loud Women and other independent online zines.

Later in 2021, Dre released her second album Kyoto Dreams. Conceived as a radio drama, the album combines instrumental city pop music with Japanese narratives. Dre designed an English-Japanese story booklet and immersive contents like a fictional map, postcards and bus tickets. The album was released digitally and on CD on 24 December 2021 in cooperation with Outland Recordings. To release the album on tape and vinyl as well, Dre launched a crowdfunding campaign on Kickstarter which was successfully funded on 10 März 2022. Kyoto Dreams has been reviewed by ELECTRICITYCLUB.CO.UK and Velvet Rebel Music.

With the completion of Kyoto Dreams, Dre decided to start working independently of music labels. After another successful Kickstarter campaign, Dre released her third album AKARI LD-01 on 7 April 2023. The album consists of instrumental cyberpunk music. As with her previous album, Dre designed a story booklet and several immersive contents like fictional employee ID cards and access cards. AKARI LD-01 has been reviewed by Velvet Rebel Music and Future Sounds.

In 2023, Dre started a crowdfunding campaign on Indiegogo to release a sequel for Moving Spaces. After the campaign was successfully funded on 26 October 2023, Dre released her latest album Moving Spaces II: Twilight. The third album of the Moving Spaces series is currently in the works.

== Other work ==
Dre is currently developing a tabletop game set in the fictional world of the album AKARI LD-01.

Additionally, Dre is developing the point-and-click adventure The Fractured Nebula in pixel art style. The game is inspired by Dre's album Moving Spaces II: Twilight. As of September 2026, the game is in alpha stage and can be tested on Dre's official Discord server.

== Personal life ==
Dre is now living in Germany again.

Dre supports human rights, civil liberties and women's equality. Her song Resistance is dedicated to the women in Iran.

Dre laments the low percentage of women in music production and that they are often reduced to their role as singers. To share her experience as a record producer, Dre founded The Audio Arcade in 2025, a learning platform for independent artists. The courses are designed for both beginners and advanced learners and provide knowledge ranging from producing the first song through to mixing, mastering and release.

== Discography ==
=== Vinyl Black Stilettos ===
- 2011: You Want Her, You Love Her
- 2012: Electrical
- 2025: Vinyl Black Stilettos – Anthology 2009-2013

=== Intergalactic Officers of Evil ===
- 2018: Space Adventures of the Mirror Universe - Vol. 1
- 2019: Space Adventures of the Mirror Universe - Vol. 2

=== Solo ===
- 2021: Moving Spaces
- 2021: Kyoto Dreams
- 2023: AKARI LD-01
- 2023: Moving Spaces II: Twilight

== Reception ==
- In 2012, the Vinyl Black Stilettos song The Game was played in the BBC TV series Lip Service.
- In 2021, the synthwave radio show ForeverSynth honoured Dre with the Best Newcomer community award.
- In 2025, four songs from Dre's album Moving Spaces were played in several episodes of the German ARD TV series Schattenseite.
- In 2025, Jess Blaise Ward released the book Making Synthwave: How an Online Music Community Invented a Genre, which examines Dre's and other artists' work within the genre.
