= Minneapolis City Hall =

- Minneapolis City Hall-Hennepin County Courthouse
- U.S. National Register of Historic Places
- Minneapolis Landmark
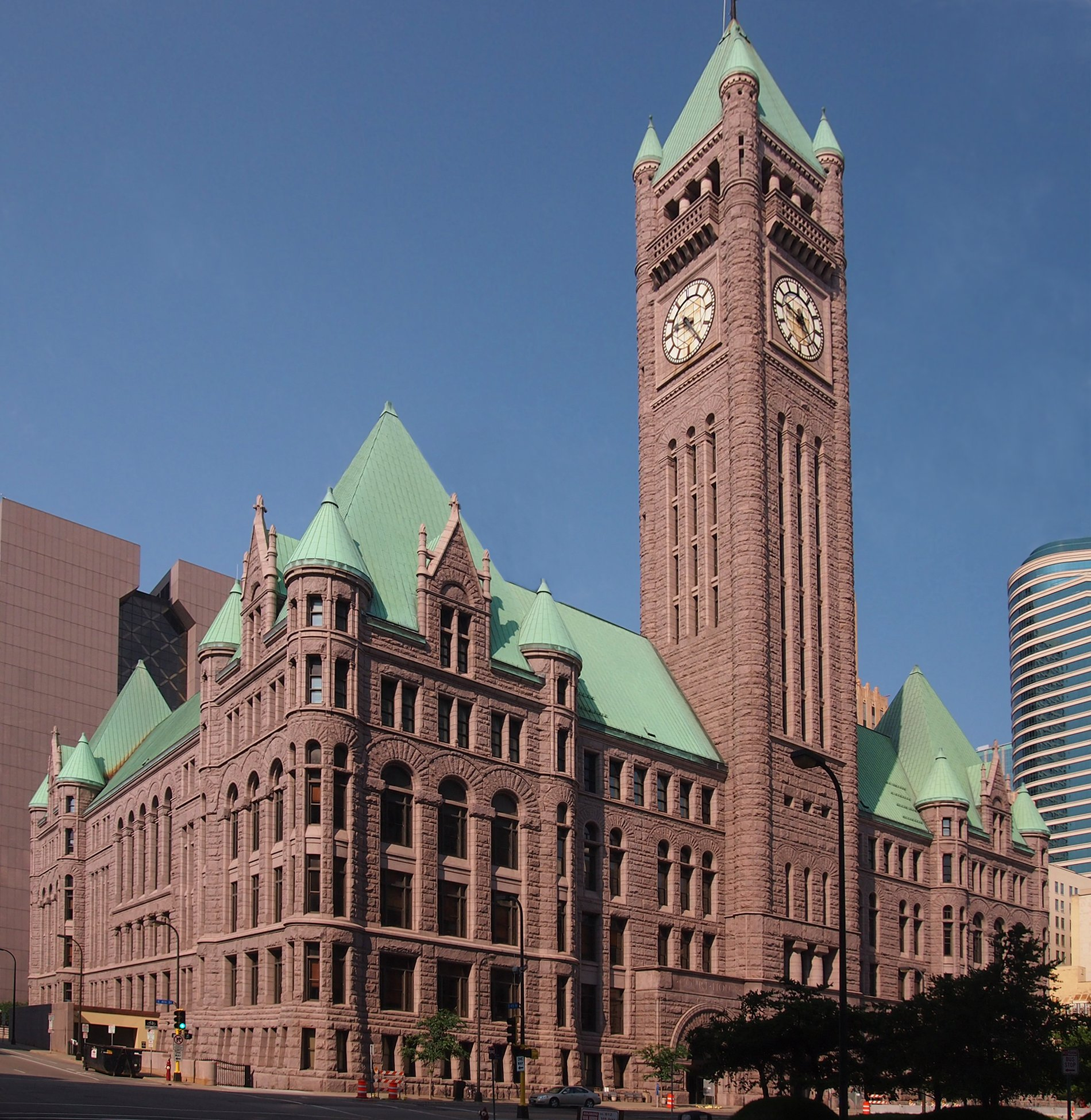
- Location: Minneapolis, Minnesota
- Coordinates: 44°58′38″N 93°15′55″W
- Built: 1888–1909
- Built by: Charles F. Haglin and Charles Morse
- Architect: Long and Kees
- Architectural style: Richardsonian Romanesque
- NRHP reference No.: 74001022

Significant dates
- Added to NRHP: December 4, 1974
- Designated MPLSL: 1977

Minneapolis City Hall and Hennepin County Courthouse (also known as the Municipal Building), designed by Long and Kees in 1888, is the main building used by the city government of Minneapolis, as well as by Hennepin County, in the U.S. state of Minnesota. The structure has served as mainly local government offices since it was built, and today the building is 60 percent occupied by the city and 40 percent occupied by the County. The building is jointly owned by the city and county and managed by the Municipal Building Commission. The Commission consists of the chair of the County Board, the mayor of the City of Minneapolis, a member of the County Board and a member of the Minneapolis City Council. The County Board chair serves as the president of the Commission and the mayor serves as the vice president. The building bears a striking resemblance to the city hall buildings in Cincinnati and Toronto. The City Hall and Courthouse was added to the National Register of Historic Places in 1974.

== Architecture ==
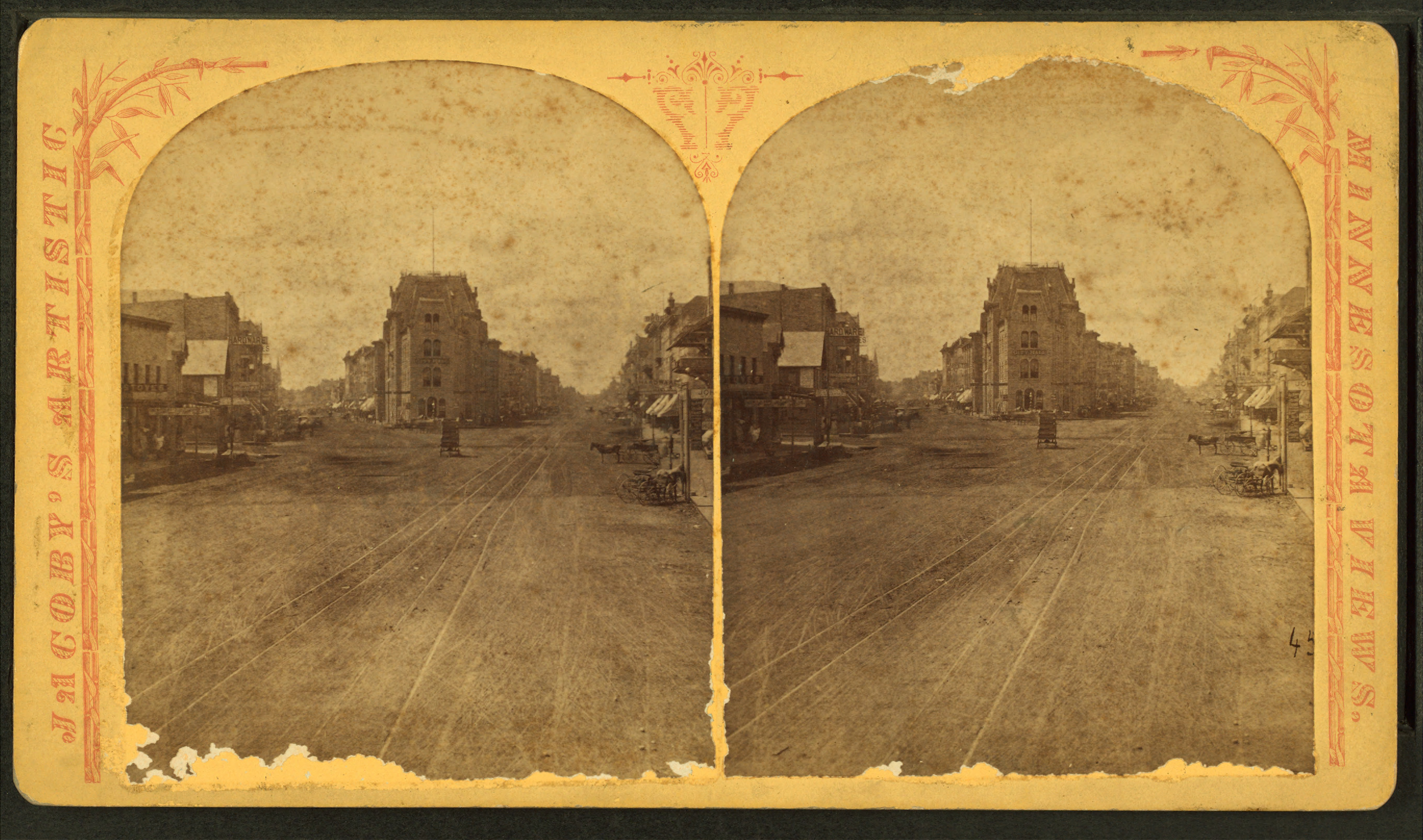
Stereoscopic photograph of the old City Hall at Nicollet Avenue and Hennepin Avenue by William H. Jacoby

The building replaced an earlier City Hall that existed from 1873 until 1912 near the old intersection between Hennepin Avenue and Nicollet Avenue. That structure eventually was razed to make way for Gateway Park, which continues to occupy part of the old City Hall site. The building also replaced an earlier courthouse and also the earlier Hennepin County Jail, which was located where U.S. Bank Stadium currently stands.

Before the construction of the original City Hall in 1873, city government officials worked out of rented space in the Pence Opera House building, located at Hennepin Avenue and 2nd Street.

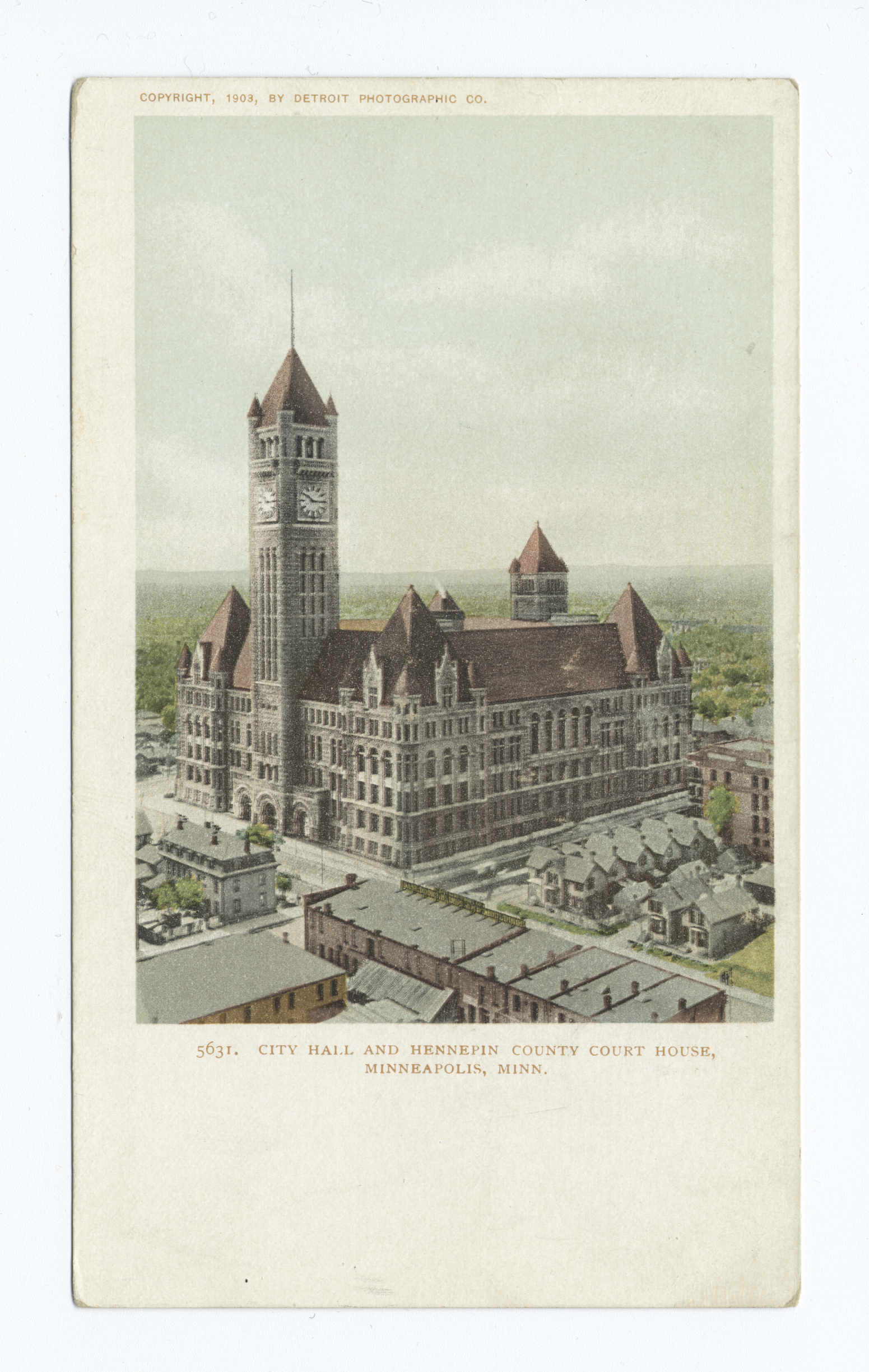
Minneapolis City Hall, Franklin Bidwell Long and Frederick Kees, architects, finished 1906 (view from northwest)

The building, located at 350 South Fifth Street, is an example of Richardsonian Romanesque architecture. The design is based upon Henry Hobson Richardson's Allegheny County Courthouse in Pittsburgh, Pennsylvania. Washington School, the first schoolhouse in Minneapolis west of the Mississippi River, was demolished to make way for the new building. Groundbreaking took place in 1889, and the cornerstone was laid (a story off the ground) in 1891. Construction did not officially end until 1906, although the structural exterior was essentially complete by the end of 1895. The county began moving in to its side (4th Ave.) in November 1895, while the city (3rd Ave.) side was not occupied until December 1902. Cost was about $3,554,000, which works out to 28¢ per cubic foot ($10/m^{3}).

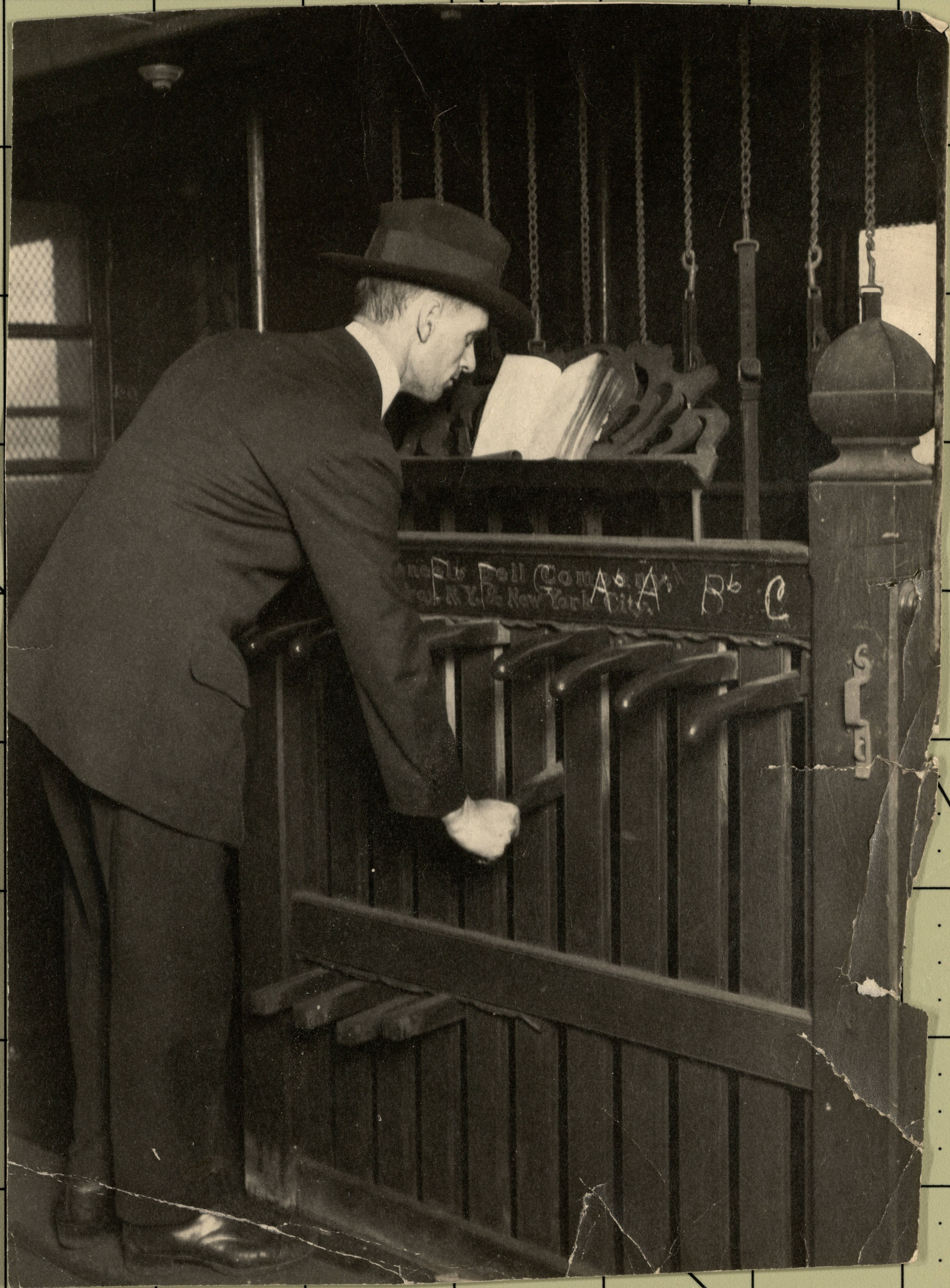
Joseph Auld plays chimes in the Minneapolis City Hall tower.

When constructed, the building claimed to have the world's largest four-faced chiming clock. At 24 feet, 6 inches (just under 7 1/2 meters), the faces are 18 inches (45.7 cm) wider than those of the Great Clock in London (which houses the famous hour bell Big Ben). The tower housing the clock reaches 345 feet (105 m) in height, and was the tallest structure in the city until the 1920s when the Foshay Tower was built. A 15-bell chime in the tower is played regularly, with noontime concerts provided to the public on holidays and on Fridays and certain Sundays during the warm months. The chime was first played on March 10, 1896. It originally consisted of 10 bells cast by Meneely Bell Foundry in West Troy, New York. Four additional bells were added to the chime in 1924; one more was added in 1972.

The building is built of rose granite quarried in Ortonville, with many stones greater than 20 tonnes in weight. The granite was originally only going to be used for the foundation of the building, with brick used for the upper portion. However, the public appreciated the appearance of the foundation so much that they lobbied for the entire building to be made of granite. This may be a reason for the significant cost overruns — it was originally expected to cost only $1.15 million.

Unlike most buildings in downtown Minneapolis, there are no skyways connecting the city hall to the rest of the city. Since exterior alterations are not allowed for buildings on the National Register of Historic Places, tunnels were constructed instead. Public pedestrian tunnels connect the building to the Hennepin County Government Center under 5th Street, and to the U.S. Courthouse under 4th Street. There are also restricted tunnels for use by the sheriff connecting under 4th Avenue to the Hennepin County Jail and to the Government Center. The METRO Blue and Green light rail lines have a stop on the south side of the building: the Government Plaza station.

== Interior ==
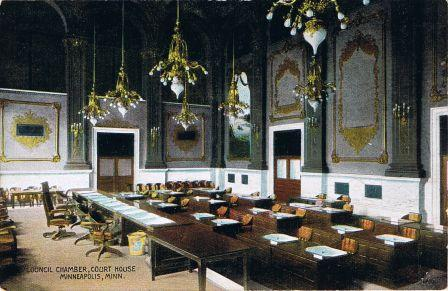
City council chambers around 1900

Inside, on the 4th Street side, there is a large five-story rotunda including a large sculpture, Father of Waters, by American sculptor Larkin Goldsmith Mead, who lived in Florence, Italy at the time. According to legend, rubbing his big toe brings good luck. It was placed inside the building in 1906.

Originally, the building had a red terracotta roof, but it began leaking so a copper roof was installed. At 180,000 pounds (81.6 t), it was said to be the largest in the country. The copper has since acquired its characteristic green patina.

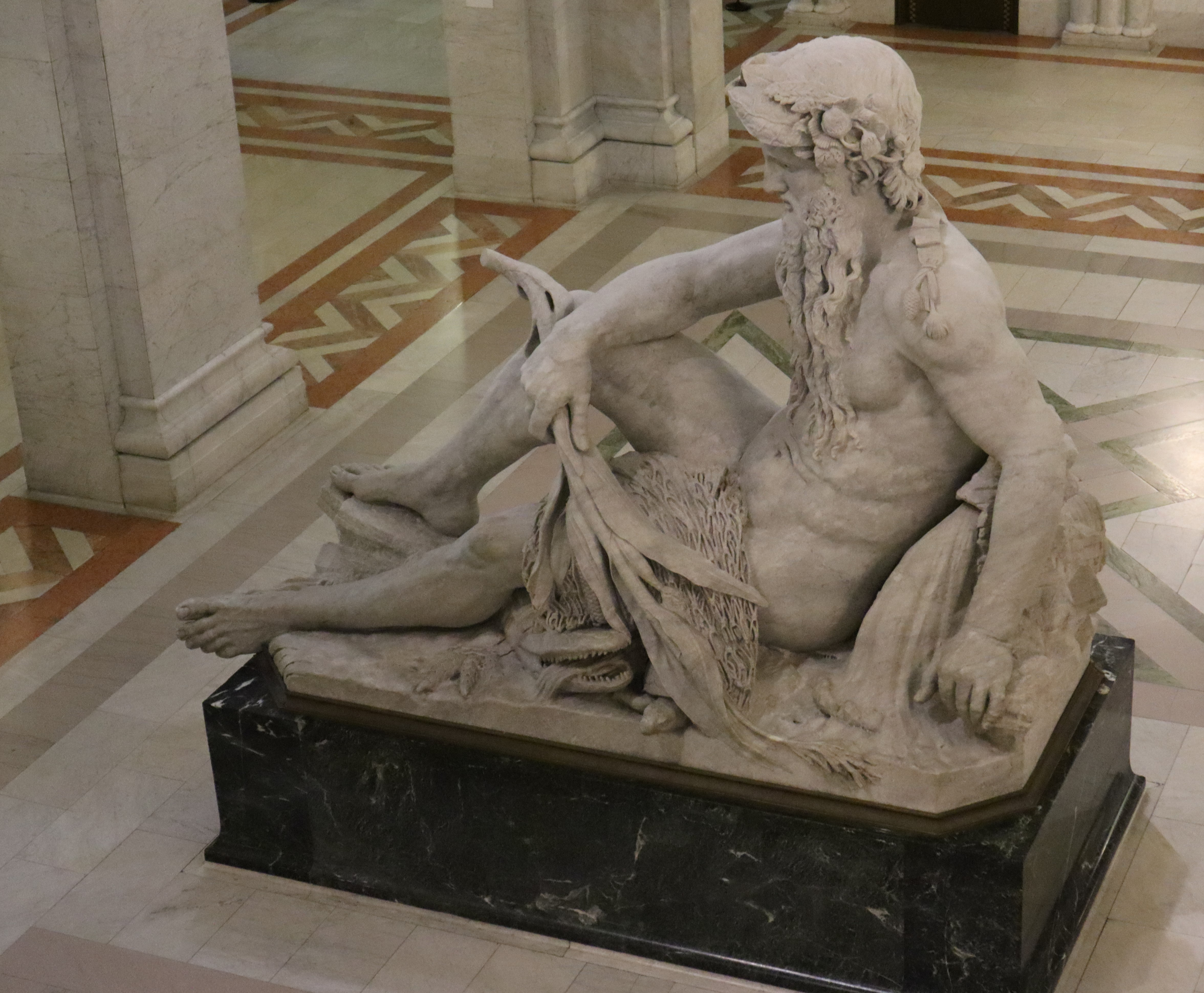
Mississippi – The Father of Waters sculpture

Over the years, some of the larger spaces in the building were subdivided to make more office space. In the 1940s and 1950s, the city built a mezzanine floor over its side of the 3rd floor, and the county built an annex building on its side of the courtyard. In 1981, a committee plan recommended converting some of the spaces back to their original design and that other spaces be converted to a more open design with offices fronting onto the courtyard instead of the current corridors. The plan also called for the annex building in the courtyard to be demolished, the courtyard domed, and the Father of Waters sculpture moved in there. Many of these aspects of the plan were rejected, although restoration of certain historic spaces has been completed.

== See also ==
- Minneapolis City Council
- List of tallest buildings in Minnesota
- List of tallest buildings in Minneapolis

Preceded by Unknown	Tallest building in Minnesota; 1895–1926; 104 metres (341 ft)	Succeeded by Plummer Building
