= Nicollet Mall station =

Light rail station in Minneapolis, Minnesota

Nicollet Mall
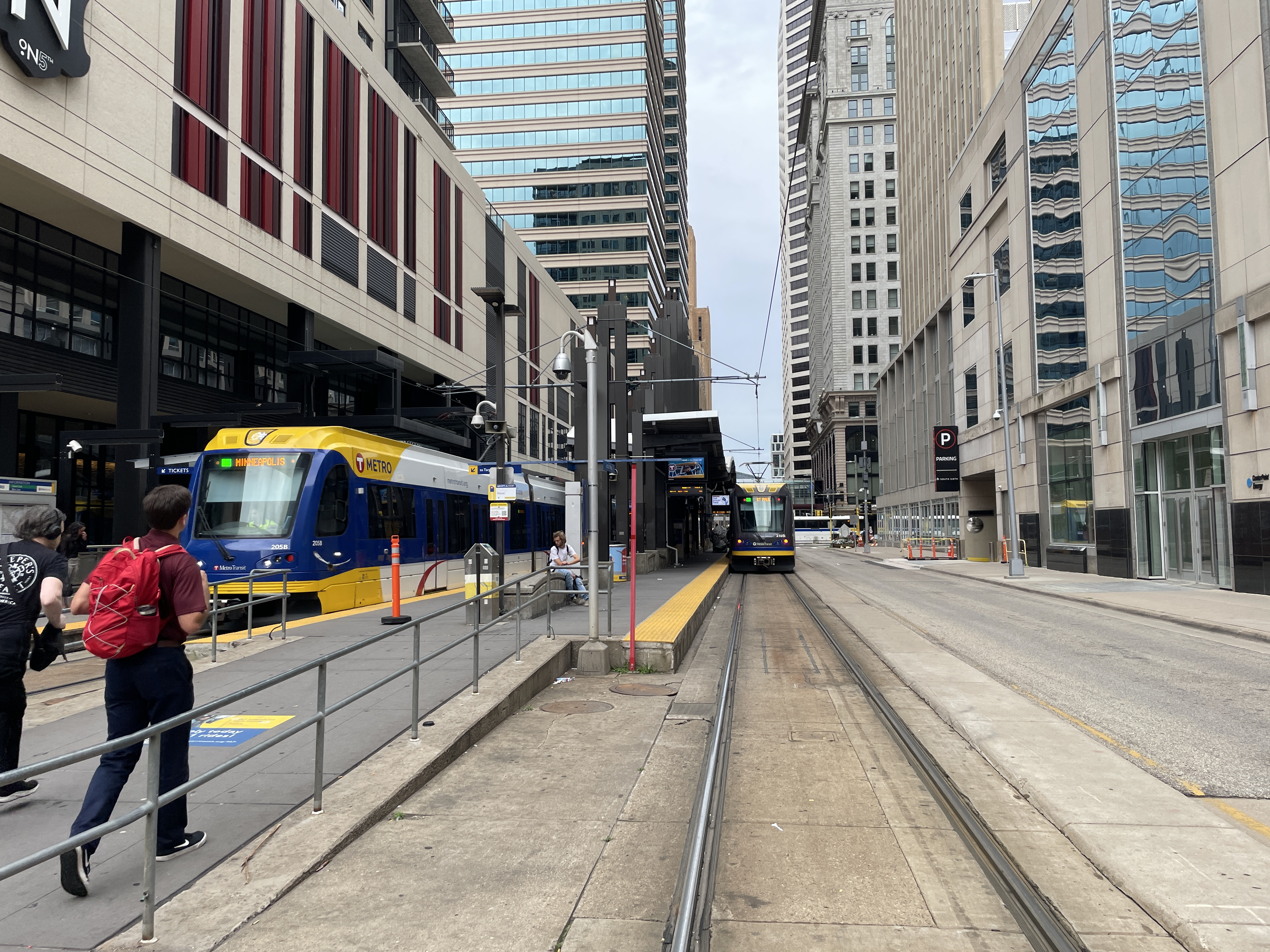
- Nicollet Mall station with the third platform and The Nic on 5th in the background

General information
- Location: 35 South 5th Street; Minneapolis, Minnesota
- Coordinates: 44°58′43″N 93°16′12″W
- Owner: Metro Transit
- Platforms: 1 island platform, 1 side platform
- Tracks: 2
- Connections: Orange Line; C Line; D Line; Metro Transit routes on Nicollet Mall and Marq2 transit corridor

Construction
- Structure type: At-grade
- Cycle facilities: Nice Ride stations
- Accessible: Yes
- Architect: ESG Architecture & Design; Thomas Rose (original station); Trace Jacques (Nic on Fifth platform)

Other information
- Station code: 5SNI
- Fare zone: Downtown

History
- Opened: June 26, 2004
- Rebuilt: 2017

Passengers
- 2025: 2,500 daily ▼15.2%
- Rank: 3 out of 37

Services
Preceding station	Metro	Following station
Warehouse District/Hennepin Avenue toward Target Field	Blue Line	Government Plaza toward Mall of America
Warehouse District/Hennepin Avenue toward Target Field	Green Line	Government Plaza toward Saint Paul Union Depot
Location

Nicollet Mall station (/ˈnɪkəlɛt/ NIH-kə-let) is a light rail station on the Metro Blue Line and Green Line in Minneapolis, Minnesota. Adjacent to the light rail platforms is the southbound Metro Orange Line bus rapid transit station Marquette & 5th Street.

This station is located on 5th Street South, between Nicollet Mall and Marquette Avenue in Minneapolis. This is a center-platform station with one westbound traffic lane south of the platform. Service began at this station when the Blue Line opened on June 26, 2004. In 2013 Metro Transit began constructing an additional northbound platform in conjunction with and as part of the Nic on Fifth apartment building. The additional platform was built to provide additional comfort and safety at the station, as well as alleviating overcrowding and providing additional capacity for the Metro Green Line Extension. While scheduled open March 2017, the new platform was opened December 22 later that year. It is the only station on the system where passengers can regularly board from either side of the train.

== Design and public art ==
The original station was designed by ESG Architecture & Design, with Thomas Rose as the design team artist. To reflect the tall buildings of downtown and vibrant energy of Nicollet Mall, the station's design incorporates undulating steel columns down the center flanked by dual curving metal roofs. This design earned the station the affectionate nickname "The Roller Coaster". The new northbound platform was designed by ESG's Trace Jacques, who also served as project designer for Nic on Fifth.

The public art installation, Small Kindness, Weather Permitting, by Janet Zweig has four interactive boxes at the station: Please turn the wheel #11, Thanks a million #28, Ring the bell and see #19, and Hit the bell! #1.

== Notable places nearby ==
- Nicollet Mall
- Gaviidae Common
- Soo Line Building
- 510 Marquette Building
- Minneapolis Central Library
- Wells Fargo Center
- Marquette Plaza
- IDS Center
