= Warehouse District/Hennepin Avenue station =

Light rail station in Minneapolis, Minnesota

Warehouse District/Hennepin
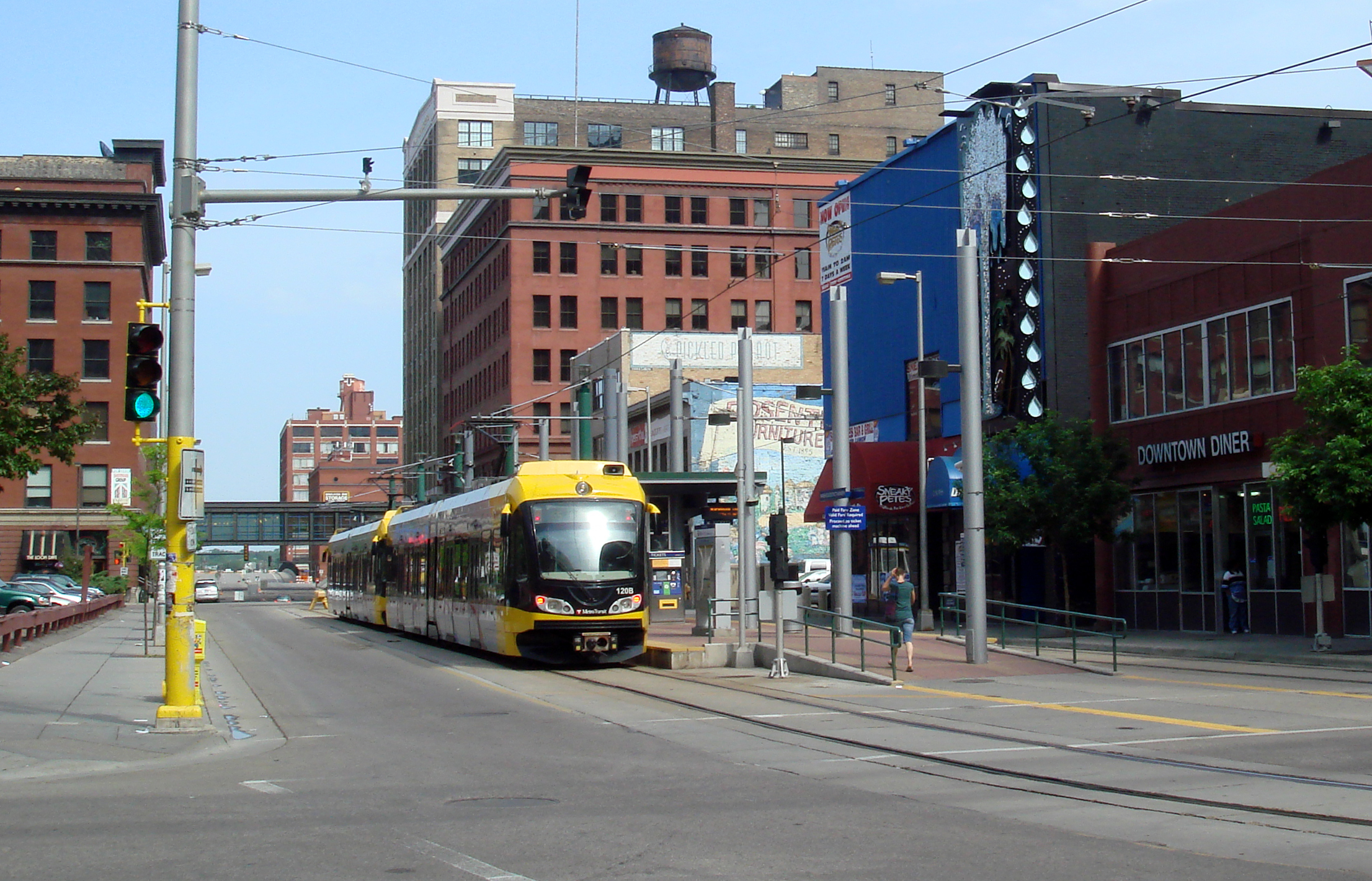
- Warehouse District/Hennepin Avenue station viewed from the corner of Hennepin Avenue and S. 5th Street (prior to the extension to Target Field station)

General information
- Location: 23 North 5th Street; Minneapolis, Minnesota
- Coordinates: 44°58′48″N 93°16′24″W
- Owner: Metro Transit
- Platforms: 1 island platforms
- Tracks: 2
- Connections: Metro Transit: 4, 6, 61

Construction
- Structure type: At-grade
- Accessible: Yes
- Architect: ESG Architecture & Design

Other information
- Station code: WAR
- Fare zone: Downtown

History
- Opened: June 26, 2004

Passengers
- 2025: 1,312 daily ▼4.5%
- Rank: 13 out of 37

Services
Preceding station	Metro	Following station
Target Field Terminus	Blue Line	Nicollet Mall toward Mall of America
Target Field Terminus	Green Line	Nicollet Mall toward Saint Paul Union Depot
Location

The Warehouse District/Hennepin Avenue station is a light rail station on the Blue Line and Green Line in Minneapolis, Minnesota. This was the original northern terminus of the Blue Line until the new Target Field station opened on November 14, 2009 to provide access to the new Northstar Commuter Rail line.

The Warehouse District station is located on 5th Street North, between 1st Avenue North and Hennepin Avenue in downtown Minneapolis. This is a center-platform station with one traffic lane to the south of the platform. Service began at this station when the Blue Line opened on June 26, 2004, and this station is where the opening ceremony was held. The first train departed at 11:00 a.m. on that day.

The station was designed by ESG Architecture & Design, who also designed the adjacent Nicollet Mall station. To reflect its neighborhood, the station incorporates brickwork and metal columns into the design. The public art installation, Untilted, by Penny Rakoff and Bill McCullam depict labor disputes that occurred in the city in the first half of the 20th century, most notably the Minneapolis Teamsters Strike of 1934. Images are printed onto ten 15.5 × 12.25 inch and two-hundred 2.75 × 2.75 inch tiles.

This station is adjacent to the Hennepin & 5th St stop on the METRO E Line bus rapid transit route.

The Target Center, home of the Minnesota Timberwolves, is a block from the station. Although Target Field station is the official stop for the Minnesota Twins' Target Field, Warehouse/Hennepin also sees significant traffic during Twins games.

== Notable places nearby ==
- First Avenue & 7th Street Entry
- Mayo Clinic Square
- Target Center
