= Target Center =

Arena in Minneapolis, Minnesota, U.S.

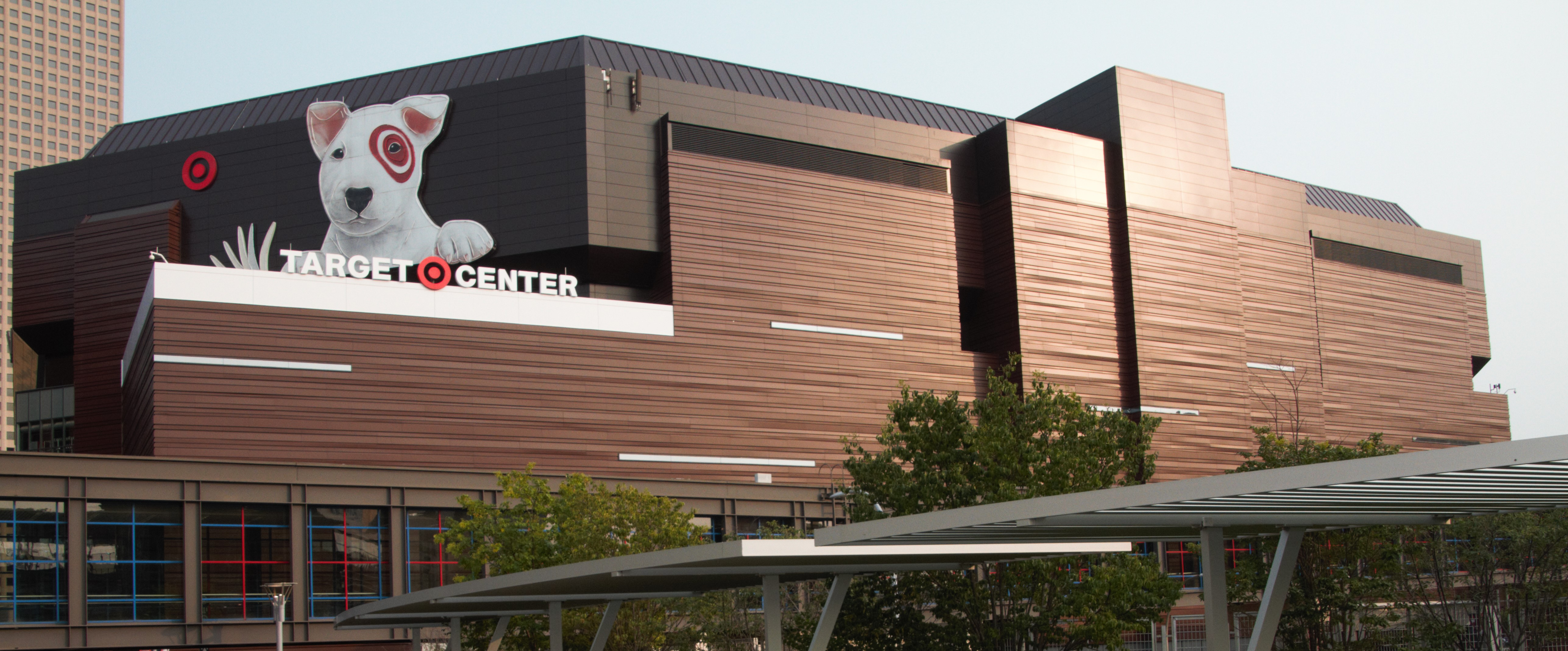
- Exterior, 2018

- Location within Minnesota Location within the United States
- Address: 600 First Avenue North
- Location: Minneapolis, Minnesota, U.S.
- Coordinates: 44°58′46″N 93°16′34″W
- Owner: City of Minneapolis
- Operator: Legends Global
- Capacity: Basketball: 18,798; Hockey: 17,500; Concerts: Up to 20,500
- Surface: Multi-surface
- Public transit: Metro Transit: Blue Line; Green Line at Warehouse District/Hennepin Avenue; C Line

Construction
- Groundbreaking: July 12, 1988
- Opened: October 13, 1990
- Renovated: 2004; 2014; 2017
- Cost: US$104 million ($283 million in 2025 dollars)
- Architects: KMR Architects, Ltd.
- Structural engineers: Ericksen Roed and Associates, Inc.
- Services engineers: Gausman & Moore
- General contractor: M.A. Mortenson Company

Tenants
- Minnesota Timberwolves (NBA) (1990–present); Minnesota Lynx (WNBA) (1999–present); Minnesota Arctic Blast (RHI) (1994, 1996); Minnesota Fighting Pike (AFL) (1996); Minnesota Valkyrie (LFL) (2011–2013)

Website
- targetcenter.com

Target Center is a multi-purpose arena located in Minneapolis, Minnesota, United States, that opened in 1990. It hosts major family shows, concerts, sporting events, graduations and private events. Target Corporation, founded and headquartered in Minneapolis since 1902, has held the naming rights to the arena since its opening.

The arena has been the home to the Minnesota Timberwolves of the National Basketball Association (NBA) since its opening and is currently also the home of the Minnesota Lynx of the Women's National Basketball Association (WNBA). The Minnesota Myth and the Target Center announced that the Myth would be playing their home games there for the 2024 Arena Football Season though only one game for the team was played in the Arena until the team folded during the season. The facility has also hosted the LFL's Minnesota Valkyrie, the RHI's Minnesota Arctic Blast, the IHL's Minnesota Moose, and the Arena Football League's Minnesota Fighting Pike in the past.

Target Center is the second-oldest arena in the NBA after Madison Square Garden, which was built in 1968.

== History ==
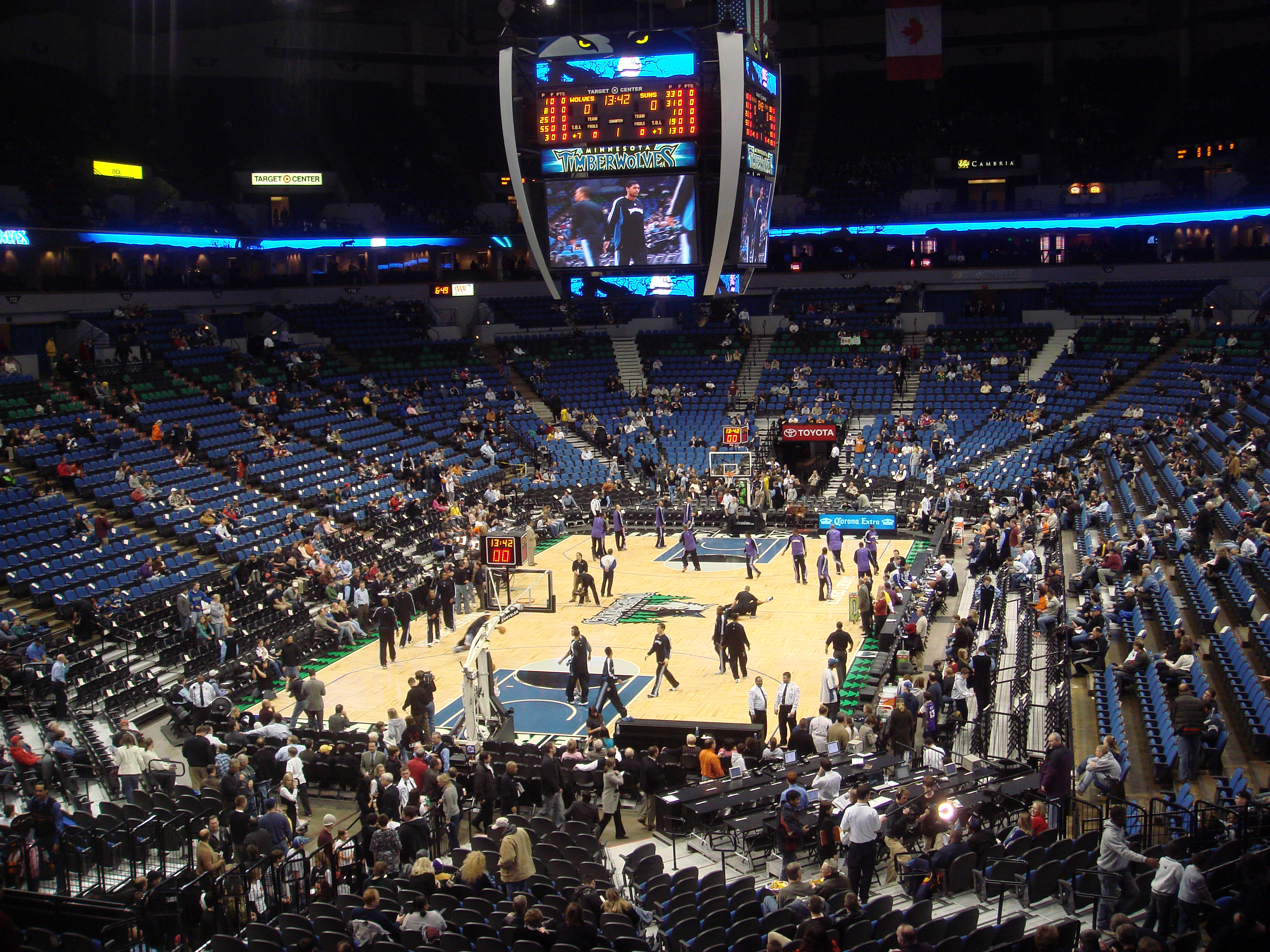
The interior before a Timberwolves game, January 2008

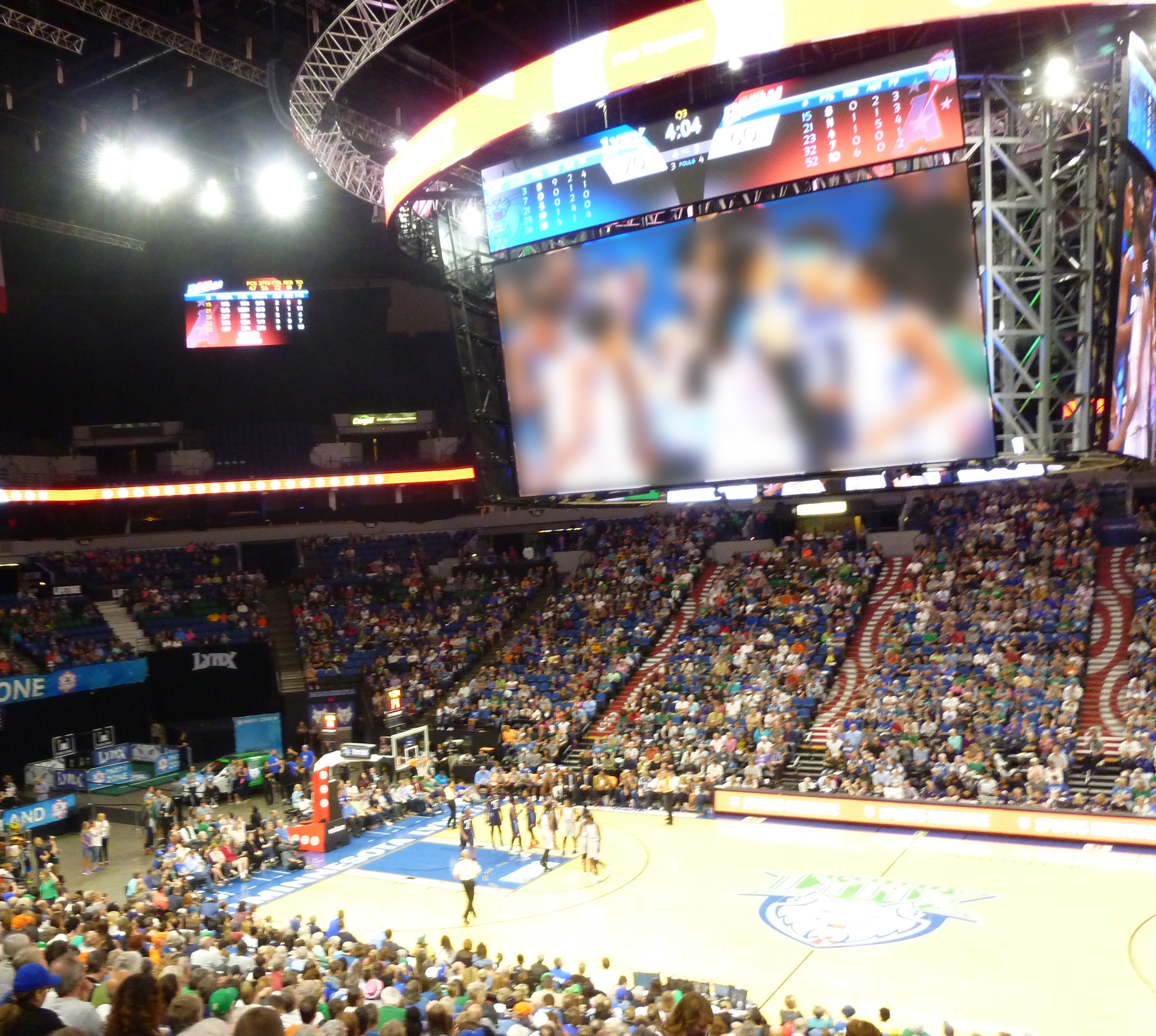
Minnesota Lynx on the Daktronics scoreboard, part of the 2016 renovation

=== Management ===
Original Timberwolves owners Marv Wolfenson and Harvey Ratner built, owned and operated the arena for five years beginning in 1990. The venue was managed by Ogden Entertainment after the city of Minneapolis purchased the arena in 1995. Glen Taylor acquired the Timberwolves in 1994 and the Lynx in 1999.

In 2000, SFX (later Clear Channel Entertainment) took over the contract. The management was changed in May 2004 from Clear Channel to Midwest Entertainment Group, a joint venture of the Timberwolves and Nederlander Concerts.

On May 2, 2007, AEG Facilities assumed the management contract of Target Center. The city of Minneapolis owns the arena and AEG Facilities manages day-to-day operations.

=== Renovations ===
In 2004, Target Center underwent a major renovation that saw the replacement of all 19,006 of its original seats plus the addition of nearly 1,500 new seats as well as the reconfiguration of the lower bowl to make the arena more "fan-friendly". In addition the arena's original scoreboard was replaced with a new 9-by-16-foot (2.7 by 4.9 m) video screen and LED signage, LED signage on the upper deck fascia, a new lounge (Club Cambria) and improved access for fans with disabilities.

Target Center was once one of three NBA arenas with parquet floors, including TD Garden in Boston, and Amway Arena in Orlando—the floor was replaced prior to the 2007–08 NBA season.

Target Center is the first arena to have a green roof. It was unveiled on September 15, 2009. In February 2011, the Timberwolves and the city of Minneapolis introduced a $155 million proposal to remodel the Target Center. Plans included shifting the main entrance to the corner of 6th Street and First Avenue, two large glass atriums, another restaurant, and a complete remodel of the interior. The plan was approved in 2012 by the Minnesota Legislature, as part of the bill that authorized a new stadium for the Minnesota Vikings.

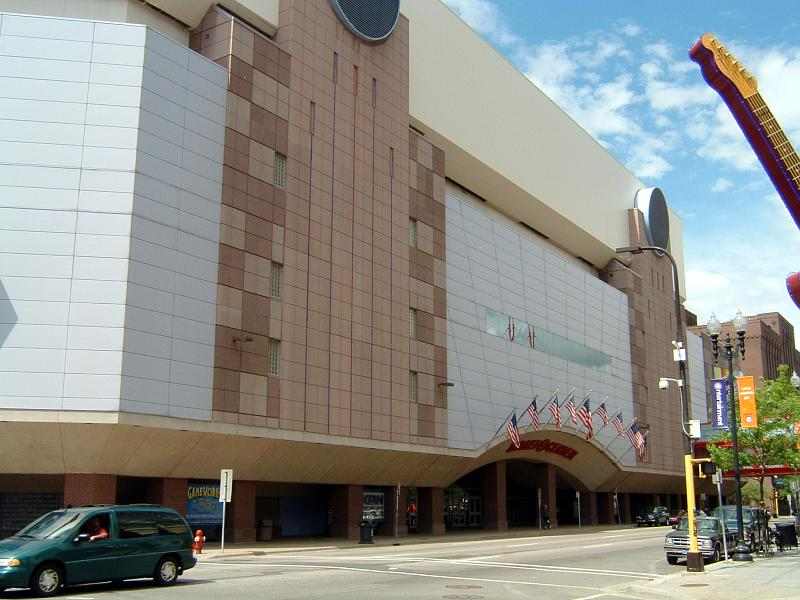
Exterior in 2016, prior to renovation

On April 3, 2015, the Minneapolis City Council gave the final approval for renovation plans for Target Center. The total cost was $140 million, which upgraded the exterior, seats, technology and loading bays, among other areas. The city contributed $74 million. Glen Taylor, owner of the Timberwolves and Lynx, paid a total of $60 million; AEG contributed $5.9 million. As a result, the Timberwolves' lease will run until 2035. The renovated building reopened in October 2017.

=== Naming rights ===
On August 7, 1990, it was announced that Minneapolis-based retail chain Target had purchased the naming rights of the Timberwolves' arena and that it would be called Target Center. Since then, the naming rights have been renewed every five years. Target last renewed its naming rights in October 2015 for an undisclosed length of time.

== Basketball ==
It hosted the 1994 NBA All-Star Game, the 1995 NCAA Women's Final Four, 2000 NBA draft and the 2018 WNBA All-Star Game. It had been slated to host an NCAA Men's Regional Final in 2021, but on November 16, 2020, the NCAA announced that it would hold the entire tournament in one city, seeming to rule out Minneapolis. The Target Center hosted the 2022 NCAA Women's Final Four.

In 2011, the Target Center played host to its first championship event, the 2011 WNBA Finals. The Minnesota Lynx won their first two games on their home floor, and ultimately won the WNBA Championship, the first title won by a team that played in Target Center.

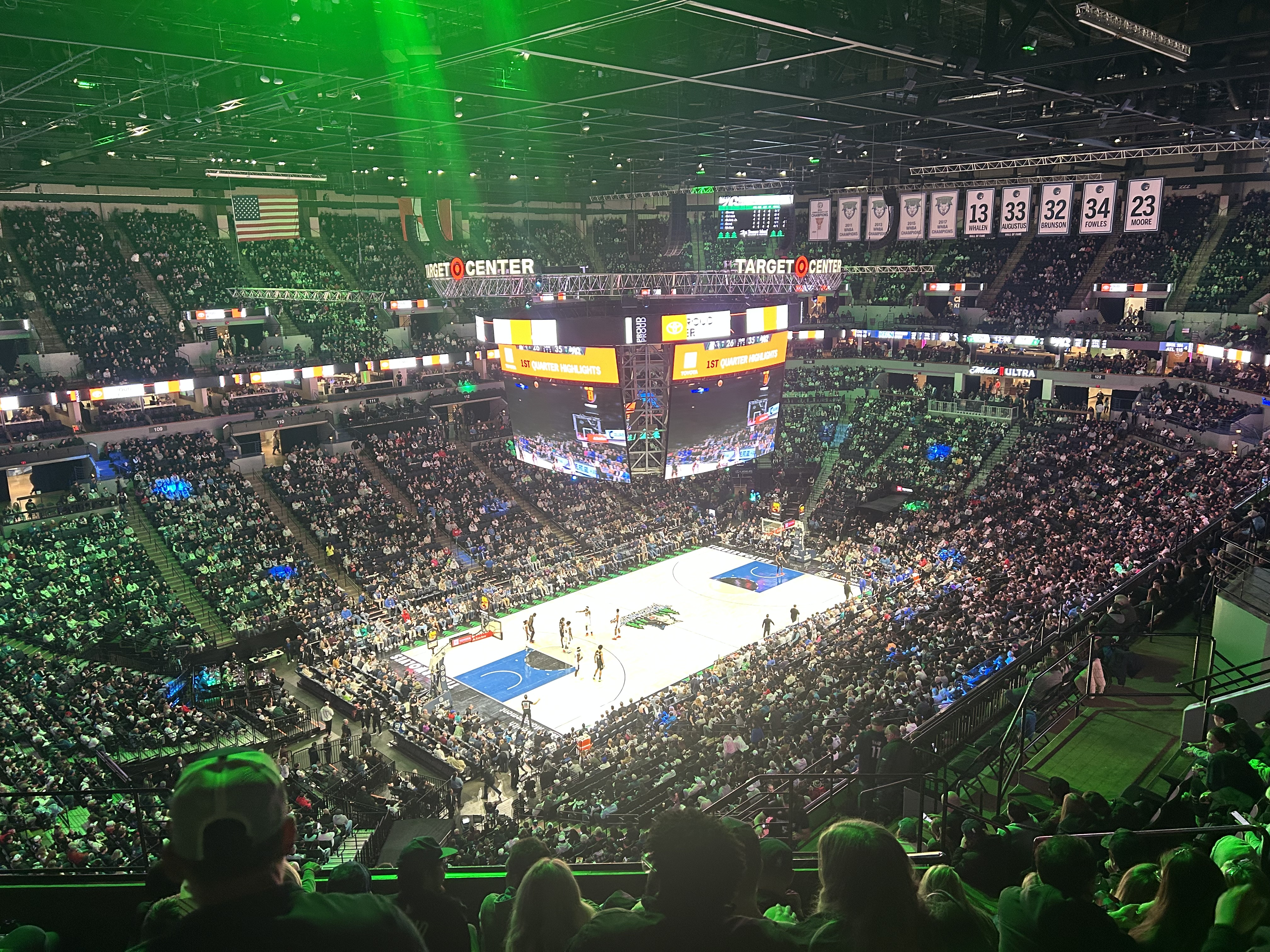
The Timberwolves getting ready to play against the Phoenix Suns in October 2025

On April 20, 2022, it was announced that the Target Center will host the Big Ten women's basketball tournament in 2023 and 2024 and the Big Ten men's basketball tournament in 2024.

== Ice hockey ==
The NHL's Minnesota North Stars refused to move into Target Center upon its opening due to conflicting soft drink rights (their home at the time, Met Center was served by Pepsi whereas Target Center's pouring rights belonged to Coca-Cola). Despite this, the arena did host 6 neutral site NHL games during the 1993–94 NHL season after the North Stars' departure to Dallas, including one in which the Stars participated. The International Hockey League's Minnesota Moose played several of their games at Target Center during their existence from 1994 to 1996. The Boys' State High School Hockey Tournament was held at Target Center in 1998 and 1999. In June 2012, it was announced that the arena would play host to the future NCHC tournament games starting in 2014. The NCHC moved the tournament to Xcel Energy Center (home of the Twin Cities' current NHL franchise, Wild) in nearby St. Paul starting in 2018.

| Date | Winning team | Score | Losing team | Score | OT | Attendance |
|---|---|---|---|---|---|---|
| December 9, 1993 | Dallas Stars | 6 | Ottawa Senators | 1 | | 14,058 |
| December 31, 1993 | Philadelphia Flyers | 4 | Boston Bruins | 3 | | 10,855 |
| January 17, 1994 | Detroit Red Wings | 6 | Tampa Bay Lightning | 3 | | 8,764 |
| March 4, 1994 | Winnipeg Jets | 6 | Ottawa Senators | 1 | | 6,388 |
| March 18, 1994 | Buffalo Sabres | 2 | New York Islanders | 2 | (OT) | 8,016 |
| March 27, 1994 | New Jersey Devils | 5 | Quebec Nordiques | 2 | | 6,222 |

== Notable events ==
=== Concerts ===
The arena has been a popular venue that has hosted many concerts, including artists like Taylor Swift, P!nk, Destiny's Child, Beyonce, Billy Joel, Celine Dion, Conan Gray, Sabrina Carpenter, Olivia Rodrigo, Garth Brooks, Lana Del Rey, Justin Bieber, Megan Thee Stallion, Elton John, Twenty One Pilots, Katy Perry, Melanie Martinez, Charli XCX, Dua Lipa, The Spice Girls, Doja Cat, One Direction, Sabrina Carpenter, Tame Impala, Metallica, KISS, Pantera, Paul McCartney, Nicki Minaj, SOMBR, and Minnesota legend Prince.

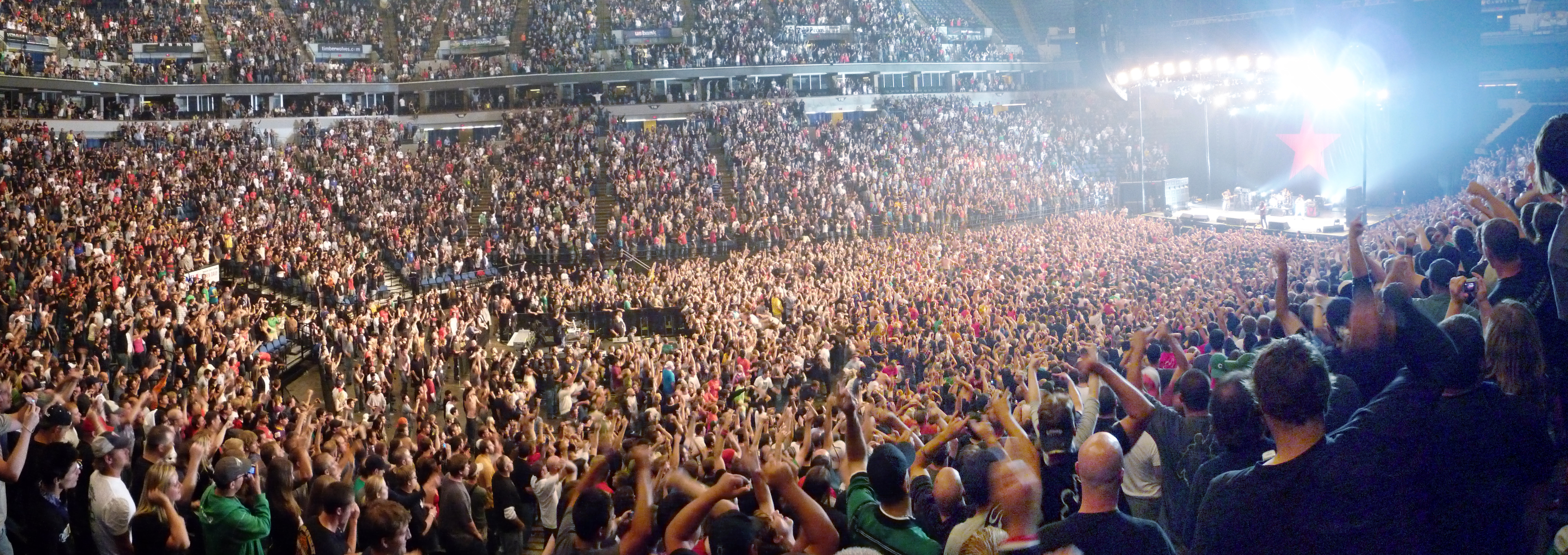
The Target Center hosting a Rage Against the Machine concert

=== MMA and professional wrestling ===
WWE has held many events at this venue and is best known for SummerSlam 1999, Judgment Day 2005, Bragging Rights 2010, Elimination Chamber 2014, TLC: Tables, Ladders & Chairs 2017 and TLC: Tables, Ladders & Chairs 2019. Notably, the venue held both the Raw and SmackDown! tribute shows commemorating the life and career of Eddie Guerrero after his death in November 2005.

Professional wrestling promotion All Elite Wrestling taped an episode of their weekly television show AEW Rampage at the center on November 12, 2021. The center also hosted that year's edition of their annual pay-per-view event Full Gear, which occurred the following day. And the venue will host Worlds End.

The Target Center held the memorable UFC championship UFC 87: Seek and Destroy in August 2008, which featured the Welterweight title match where Georges St-Pierre defeated Jon Fitch.

On October 5, 2012, UFC on FX: Browne vs. Bigfoot was held at the venue.

On June 29, 2019, UFC on ESPN: Ngannou vs. dos Santos was held at the venue.

=== Gymnastics ===
In 2016, the arena hosted the Kellogg's Tour of Gymnastics Champions.

In 2024, the arena hosted the US Olympic Trials for gymnastics for the 2024 Summer Olympics in Paris from June 27 to 30.

=== Other events ===
In 1991, the center hosted the 1991 U.S. Figure Skating Championships, where skater Tonya Harding became the first American woman and second in the world to land a triple axel jump in competition. Harding took home the gold medal.

In 1999, Target Center hosted the "People's Celebration" inaugural event for Gov. Jesse Ventura. The event drew 14,000 people, and included performances by Jonny Lang, Warren Zevon, and America.

The Professional Bull Riders held a Built Ford Tough Series event at Target Center during the 2003 and 2006 seasons.

The Target Center hosted the Rally for the Republic convention organized by the Campaign for Liberty, a movement founded by Texas Congressman Ron Paul, who ran an unsuccessful bid for the 2008 Republican presidential nomination. Among the attendees of the convention were former Governor of Minnesota Jesse Ventura, Barry Goldwater Jr., and former Governor of New Mexico Gary Johnson.

The Target Center is home to the Target Corporation Annual Sales Meeting, events that host more than 10,000 retail managers and employees near Target's corporate offices. In 2018, Dave Matthews performed a short set at the event.

President Donald Trump held a rally at the arena on October 10, 2019.

Hot Wheels Monster Trucks Live hosted their Glow Party event at the arena on November 19, 2022.

== Attendance records ==
- The current confirmed highest attendance record for a single event in the arena's history was the Timberwolves and Warriors game on March 10, 2017, attended by 20,412 people.
- The record for tickets sold during a single engagement at the venue was set by Garth Brooks on his 2014 World Tour, with approximately 205,000 tickets sold for 11 shows from November 6 to 15.
- The highest grossing one-day event was UFC on August 8, 2009.

== U.S. Bank Theater ==
Target Center can convert into a 2,500-to-7,500-seat theater known as the U.S. Bank Theater. The Theater contains a movable floor-to-ceiling curtain system that allows the venue to be transformed based on specific show needs. In addition to concerts, the U.S. Bank Theater can also be used for family and Broadway shows.

== Transportation and location ==
Target Center is a block away from the following Metro Transit stations:

- Warehouse District/Hennepin Avenue, served by the Metro Blue and Green light rail lines
- Ramp A/7th St. Transit Center that serves 11 bus routes
- Ramp B/5th St. Transit Center that serves 10 bus routes

The arena is also across the street from the well-known Minneapolis nightclub First Avenue. Target Field, the home of Major League Baseball's Minnesota Twins, is located just across the street from the Target Center, and shares the public parking that the arena also uses.

== See also ==
- List of indoor arenas by capacity

Events and tenants
| Preceded by Metrodome | Home of the Minnesota Timberwolves; 1990 – present | Succeeded by current |
| Preceded by first arena | Home of the Minnesota Lynx; 1999 – 2016 | Succeeded by Xcel Energy Center |
| Preceded by Xcel Energy Center | Home of the Minnesota Lynx; 2018 – present | Succeeded by current |
| Preceded by first arena | Home of the Minnesota Fighting Pike; 1996 | Succeeded by last arena |
| Preceded by Delta Center | Host of the NBA All-Star Game; 1994 | Succeeded by America West Arena |
| Preceded by Madison Square Garden | Host of SummerSlam; 1999 | Succeeded by Raleigh Entertainment and Sports Arena |
| Preceded by Mellon Arena | Host of WWE Bragging Rights; 2010 | Succeeded by final |
