= David Graham (architect) =

David Graham (born May 19, 1953) is an American architect and founding principal of Elness Swenson Graham Architects Inc. (ESG Architecture & Design) based in Minneapolis, Minnesota.

== Biography ==
Graham was born in Saint Paul, Minnesota on May 19, 1953. He graduated from Highland Park Senior High in 1971. He attended the University of Minnesota where he earned a Bachelor of Environmental Design in 1977 and a Bachelor of Architecture degree in 1978.

He attended Harvard University in Cambridge, Massachusetts in 1983, where he earned a Master of Architecture degree with a faculty letter of commendation. Upon graduation from Harvard, he returned to Minneapolis and was a member of the faculty at the University of Minnesota College of Design teaching Urban Design and Architecture. He was also a full-time partner at BRW Inc., an architecture and engineering firm.

In 1994, David founded Elness Swenson Graham (ESG) Architects with Arvid Elness and Mark Swenson. Shortly after, Arvid Elness died in 1996. Graham and Swenson led the firm until 2020 when they both sold their shares and stepped down from the Board of Directors. In 2017, ESG Architects changed its name to ESG Architecture & Design.

Under Graham and Swenson's leadership, ESG became one of the largest architectural firms in Minnesota specializing in urban city building, innovative residential design, mixed-use and hospitality.

Throughout his career, Graham centered his practice on bridging architecture and urban design by focusing on the relationships between individual buildings and their larger urban context. In his work, he applied urban design principles including pedestrian-friendly streetscapes, mix of uses, density, sensitivity to historic context, access to public transportation and affordability.

Graham's principle-based approach to design included interdisciplinary collaborations among civic leaders and politicians, city planners and planning commissions, fellow architects and engineers, developers and city residents. In 2006, Graham collaborated with Minneapolis Mayor R.T. Rybak and the City Planning Department on the Mayor's "Great City Design Teams." The focus of the mayor's program was on the relationship between Minneapolis neighborhood patterns, revitalization of the public realm, and future city evolution along Washington Avenue and the East Bank Mills along the Mississippi River. Graham chaired this team as part of the AIA 150 celebration, a year-long campaign focusing on livable communities.

Graham's city-building residential and mixed-use projects have become models for future development and many have been recognized with awards from the American Institute of Architects. Known for its prominent site adjacent to the Walker Art Center and Minneapolis Sculpture Garden, 301 Kenwood Condominiums won a 2003 AIA Honor Award from the Minnesota Chapter for its "incredible views for the occupants while leveraging its museum-area site.". Graham's studio Master Plan for Ramsey Town Center in Ramsey, Minnesota, also received an AIA Honor Award in 2003 from the Minnesota Chapter and a National AIA Honor Award for Urban Design in 2005.

Other urban city building projects of note include the Edgewater, Zenith Condominiums, Nic on Fifth and Midtown Lofts, Midtown Exchange (historic Sears building), and multiple phases of Bloomington Central Station.

Graham's involvement with the AIA spanned his career and he participated in numerous events, presentations and educational sessions. In 2007, Elness Swenson Graham Architects received the AIA MN Firm Award for its "tremendous impact the firm has had on the Twin Cities and the region in the area of urban design and infill architecture."

In 2009, Graham was elected a Fellow of the American Institute of Architects (FAIA.) Only 3% of AIA members have received this distinction.
