= Soo Line Building =

Skyscraper in Minneapolis, Minnesota

- First National Bank-Soo Line Building
- U.S. National Register of Historic Places
- Minneapolis Landmark
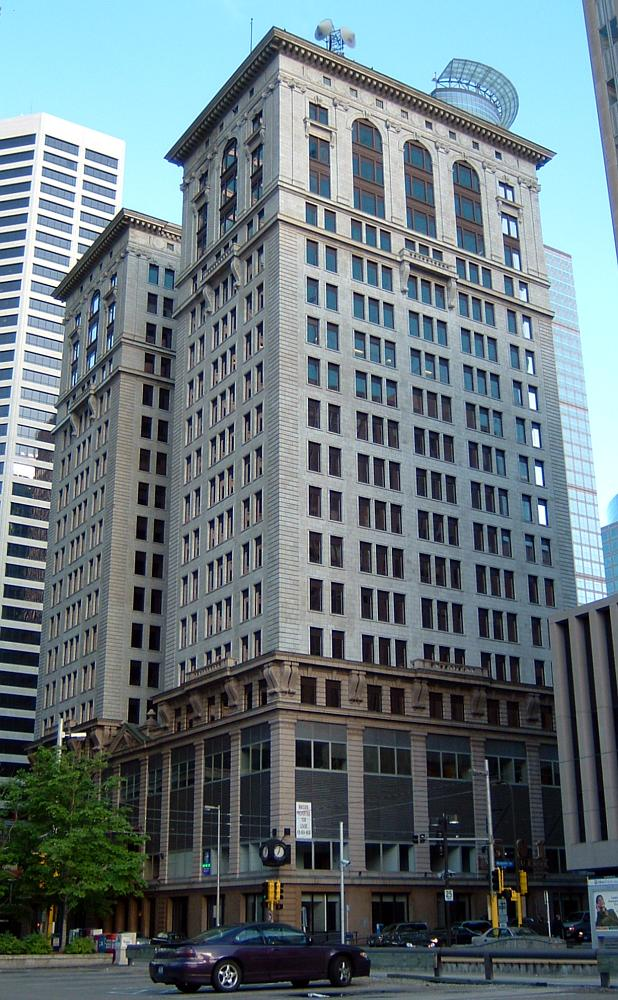
- Northwest view of the Soo Line Building (501 Marquette), 2005

- Location within Minnesota Location within the United States
- Location: Minneapolis, Minnesota
- Coordinates: 44°58′41″N 93°16′9″W
- Built: 1915
- Architect: Robert W. Gibson
- NRHP reference No.: 08000402

Significant dates
- Added to NRHP: May 12, 2008
- Designated MPLSL: 1996

The Soo Line Building is a 19-story residential highrise in Minneapolis, Minnesota. It was the tallest commercial building in the Minneapolis from the time it was completed in 1915 until the 32-story Foshay Tower was built in 1929.

== History ==
The Soo Line Building was built for the First National Bank of Minneapolis, a predecessor of today's U.S. Bancorp (U.S. Bank). The building was designed by the Beaux-Arts master Robert W. Gibson. The building later served for many years as headquarters of the Minneapolis, St. Paul and Sault Ste. Marie Railroad, which added an iconic clock to the corner of the building's street level. For commercial purposes, it was sometimes referred to by its address, 501 Marquette.

The Canadian Pacific Railway became a major shareholder for the Soo Line in 1890. The MStP&SSM merged with numerous CP subsidiaries in 1961 to form the "new" Soo Line Railroad.

During the 1960s, a remodeling operation transformed the building into small offices. The marble floors were covered with carpet.

In 1985, the Soo purchased trackage from the bankrupt Chicago, Milwaukee, St. Paul & Pacific Railroad ("Milwaukee Road") and usurped it a year later. CP purchased the company outright in 1990; the Calgary-based railway's U.S. headquarters then took over the space for its 400 employees.

The building was listed on the National Register of Historic Places on May 12, 2008.

In 2011, the building was purchased by Michigan-based developer Village Green Properties for $11.3 million; after the commercial tenants were relocated, Village Green began conversion of the property in October 2012 into a 254-unit luxury apartment building with a street-level restaurant, scheduled for completion in Fall 2013. In 2012, the CP moved out of the building.

The first residents of the remodeled building moved in by the end of 2013.

== Location ==
The building is located across Marquette Avenue from the 510 Marquette Building, the original Federal Reserve Bank of Minneapolis. A skyway connects the building to its neighbor across 5th Street South. Residents' amenities include a rooftop, an indoor/outdoor pool, and a hot tub on the 20th floor.

In front of that building is the Nicollet Mall station of the Blue and Green light rail lines. Nearby is Canadian Pacific Plaza, renamed after the Canadian Pacific Railroad moved in after vacating the Soo Line Building.

== Gallery ==
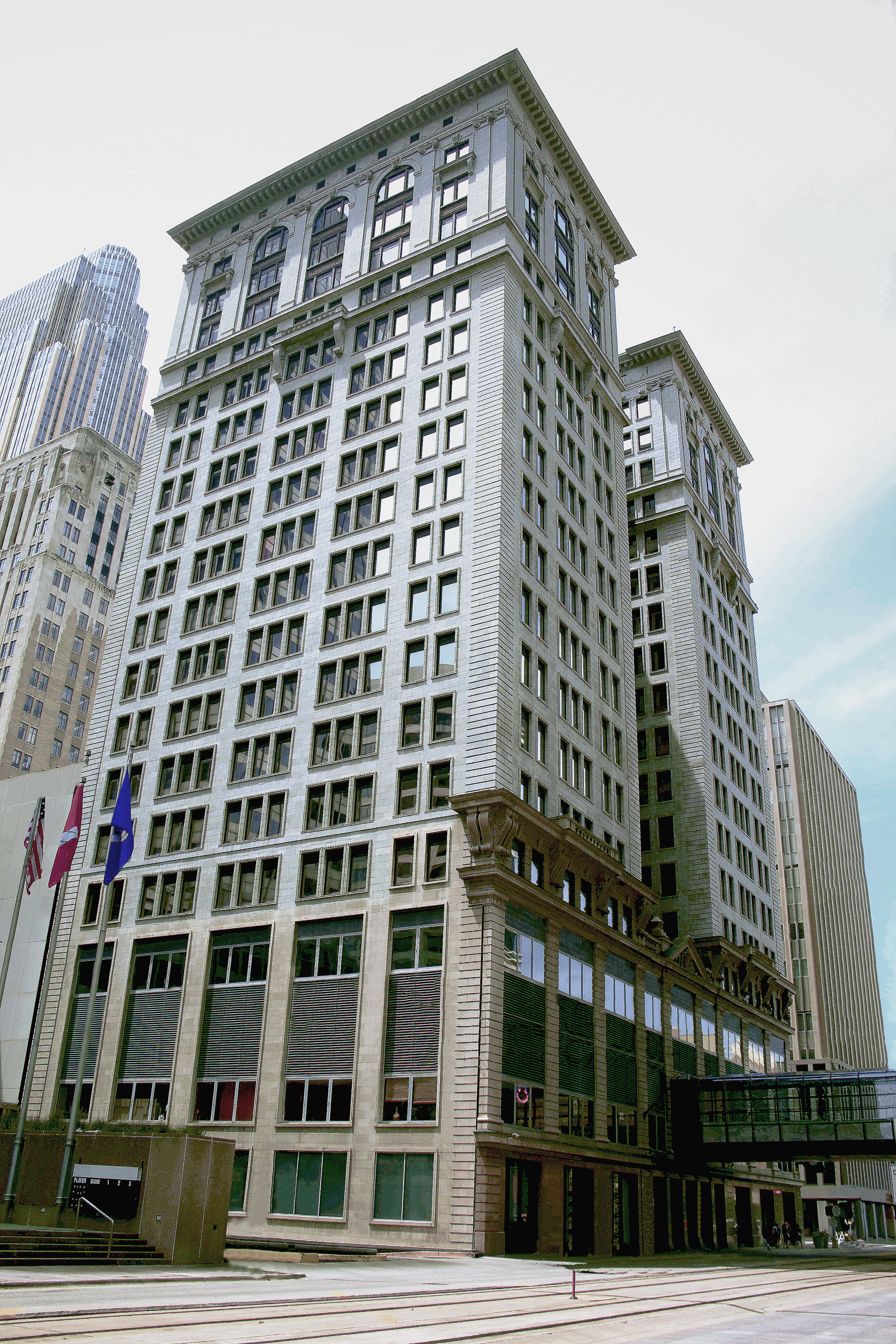
Front-corner side, skyway visible.

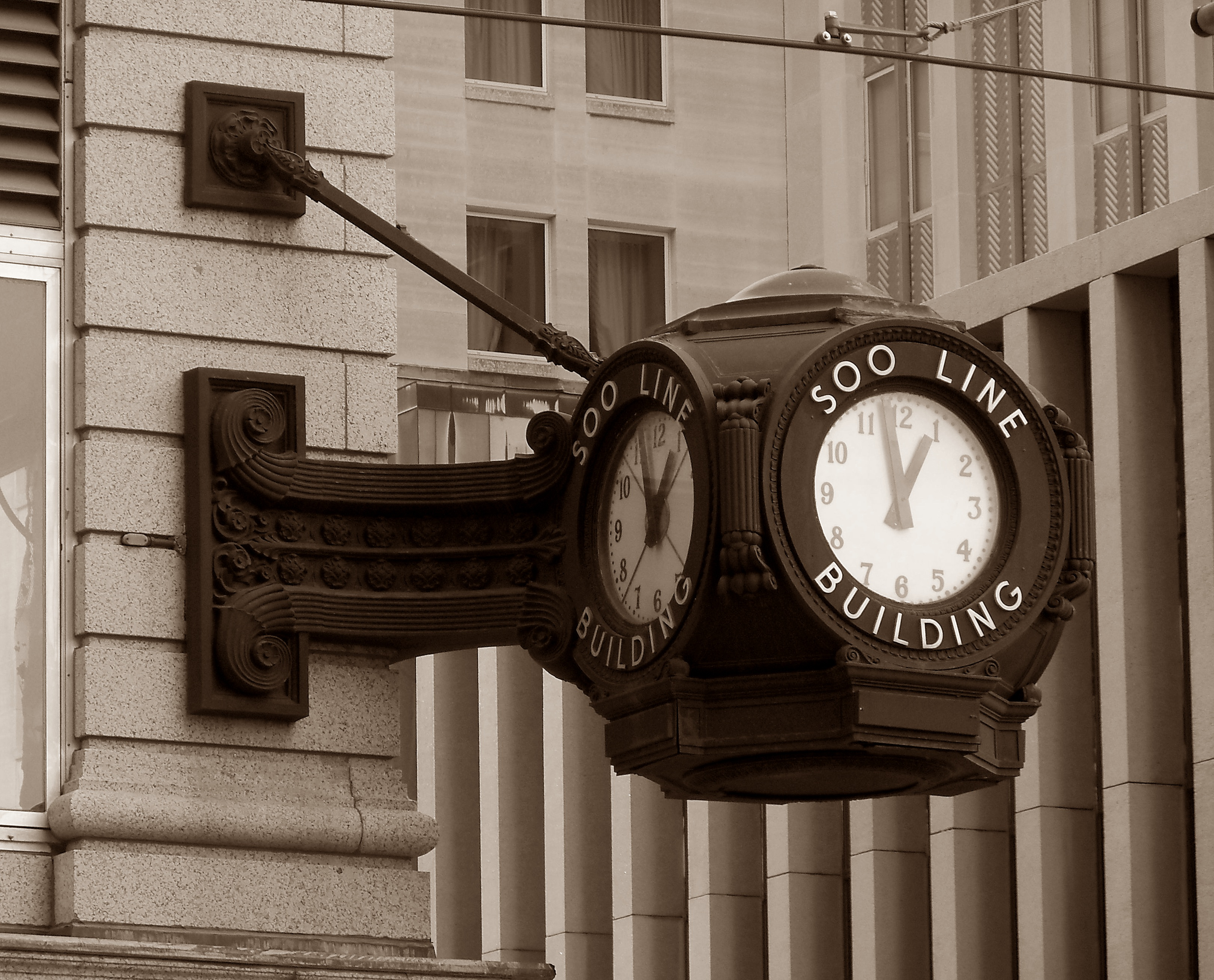
Building's clock.

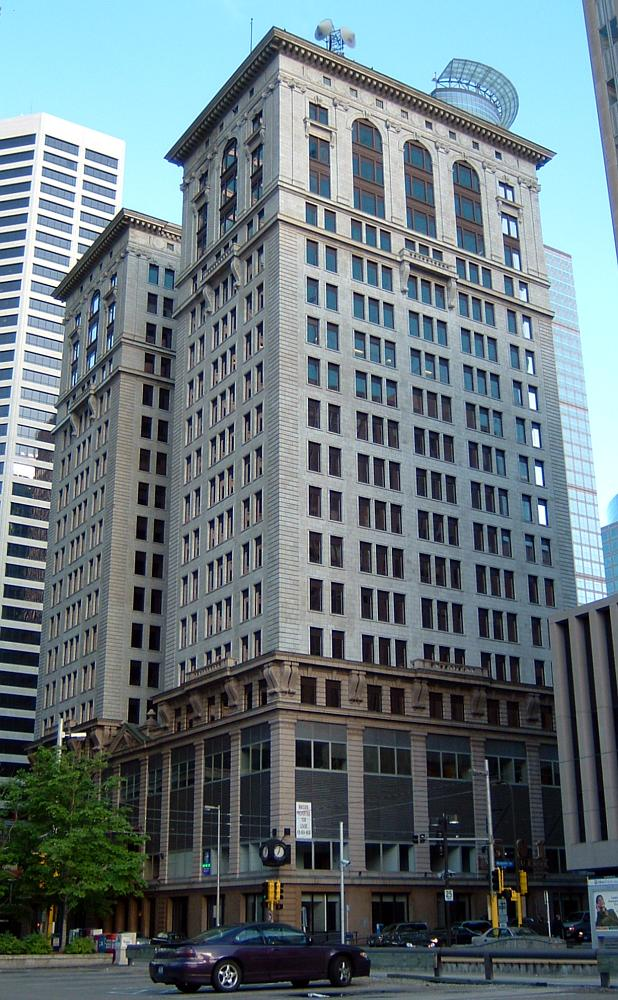
Front-corner side.

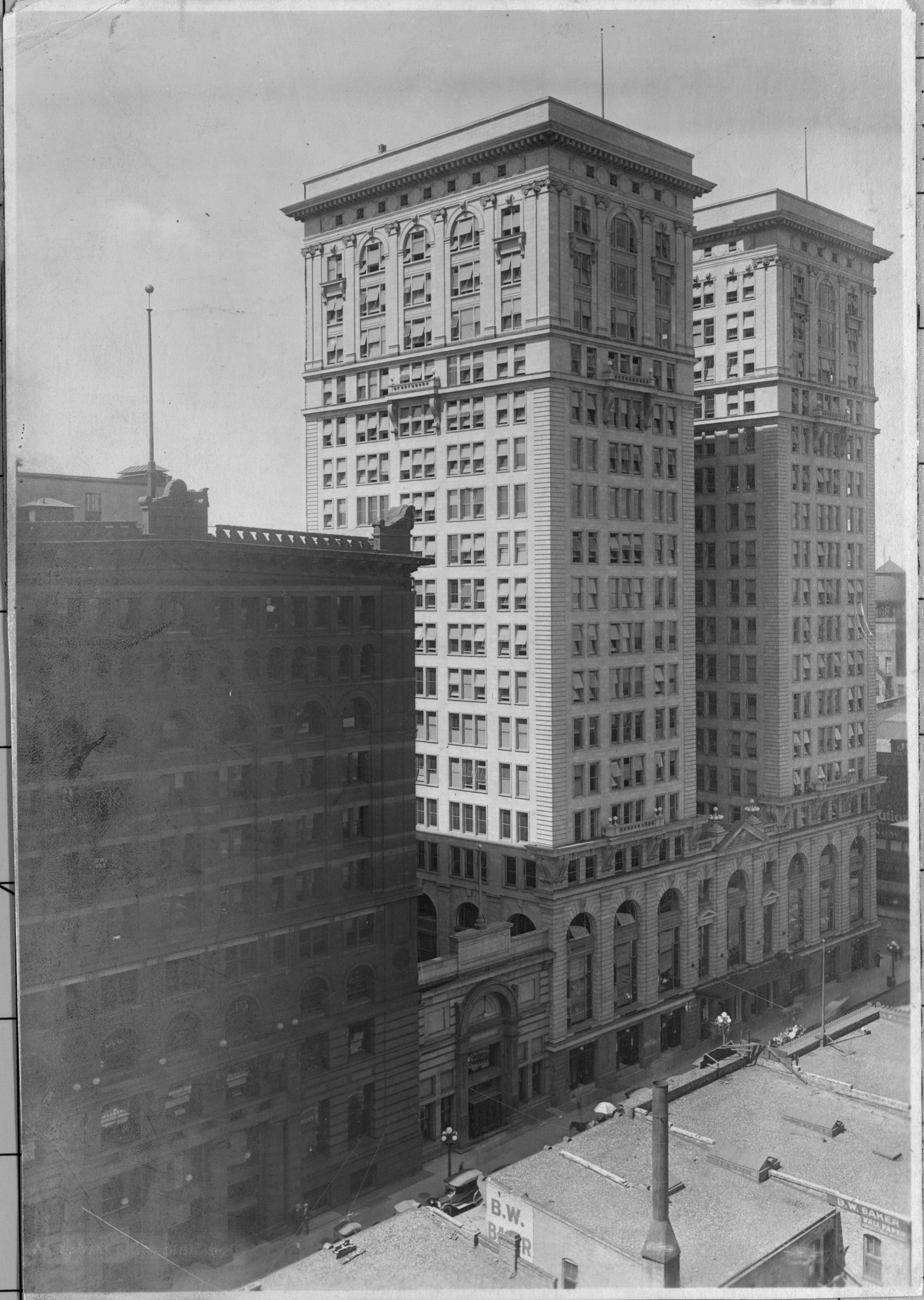
First National-Soo Line Building, Minneapolis, c. 1920

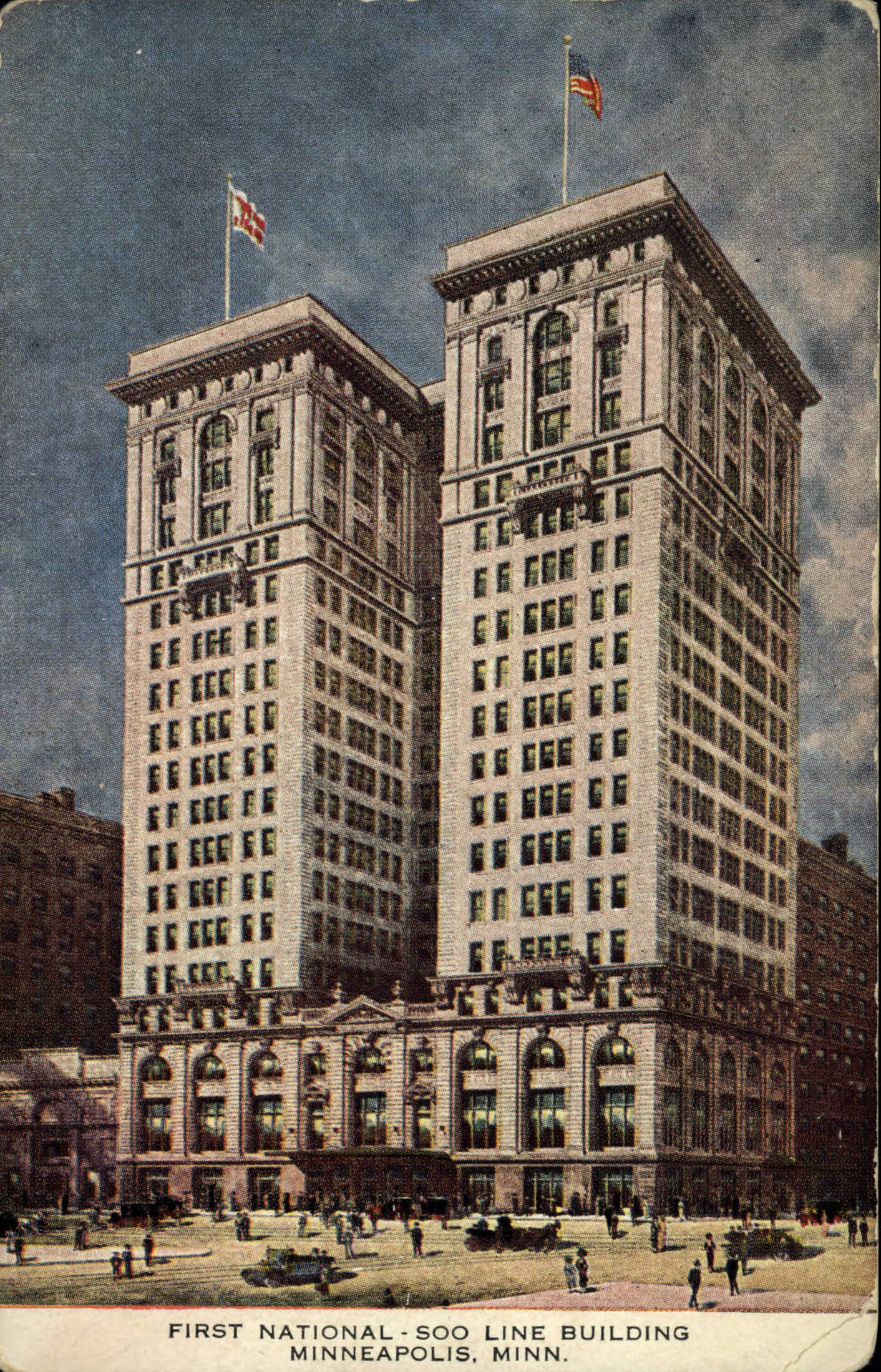
Postcard of First National-Soo Line Building, Minneapolis, 1910s

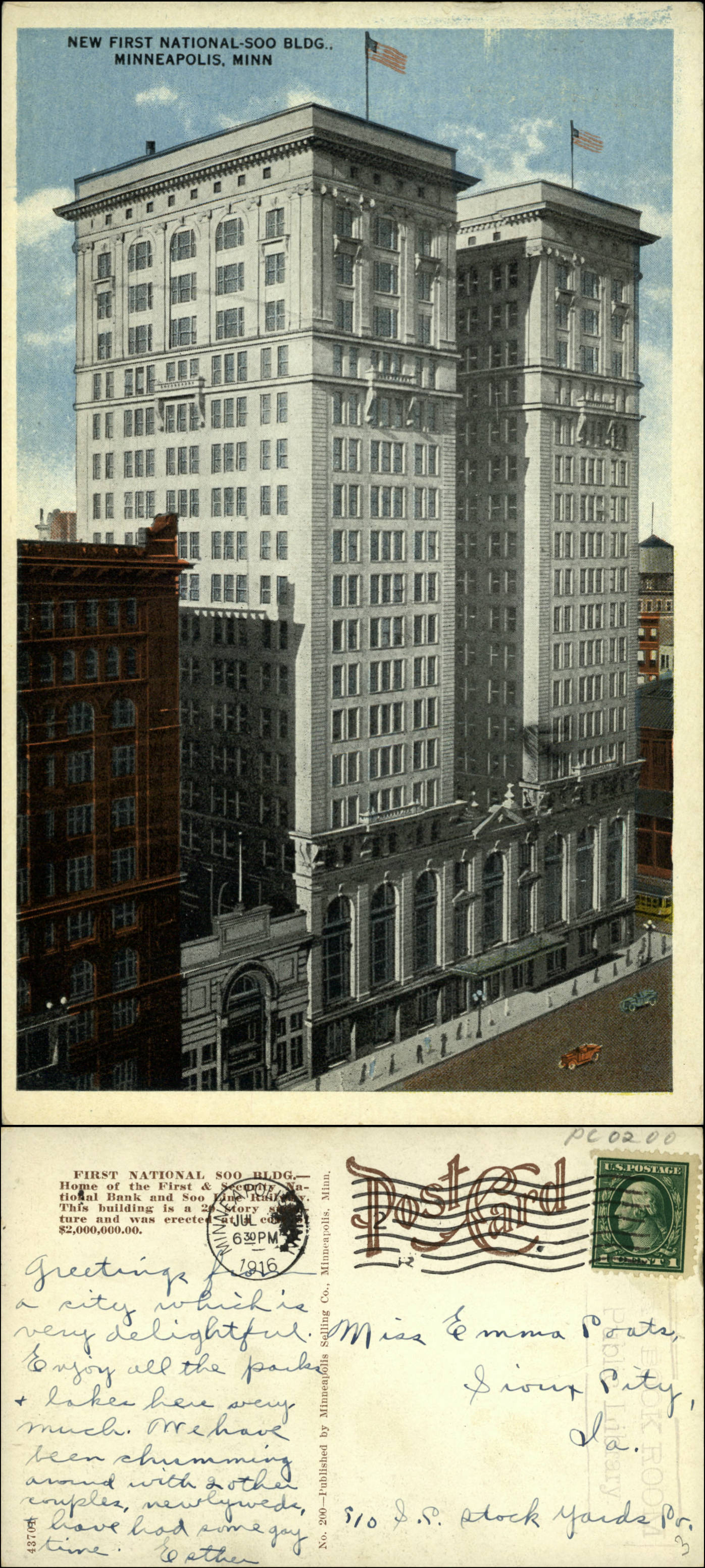
Postcard of the First National-Soo Building with message on back, 1916
