= 510 Marquette Building =

510 Marquette
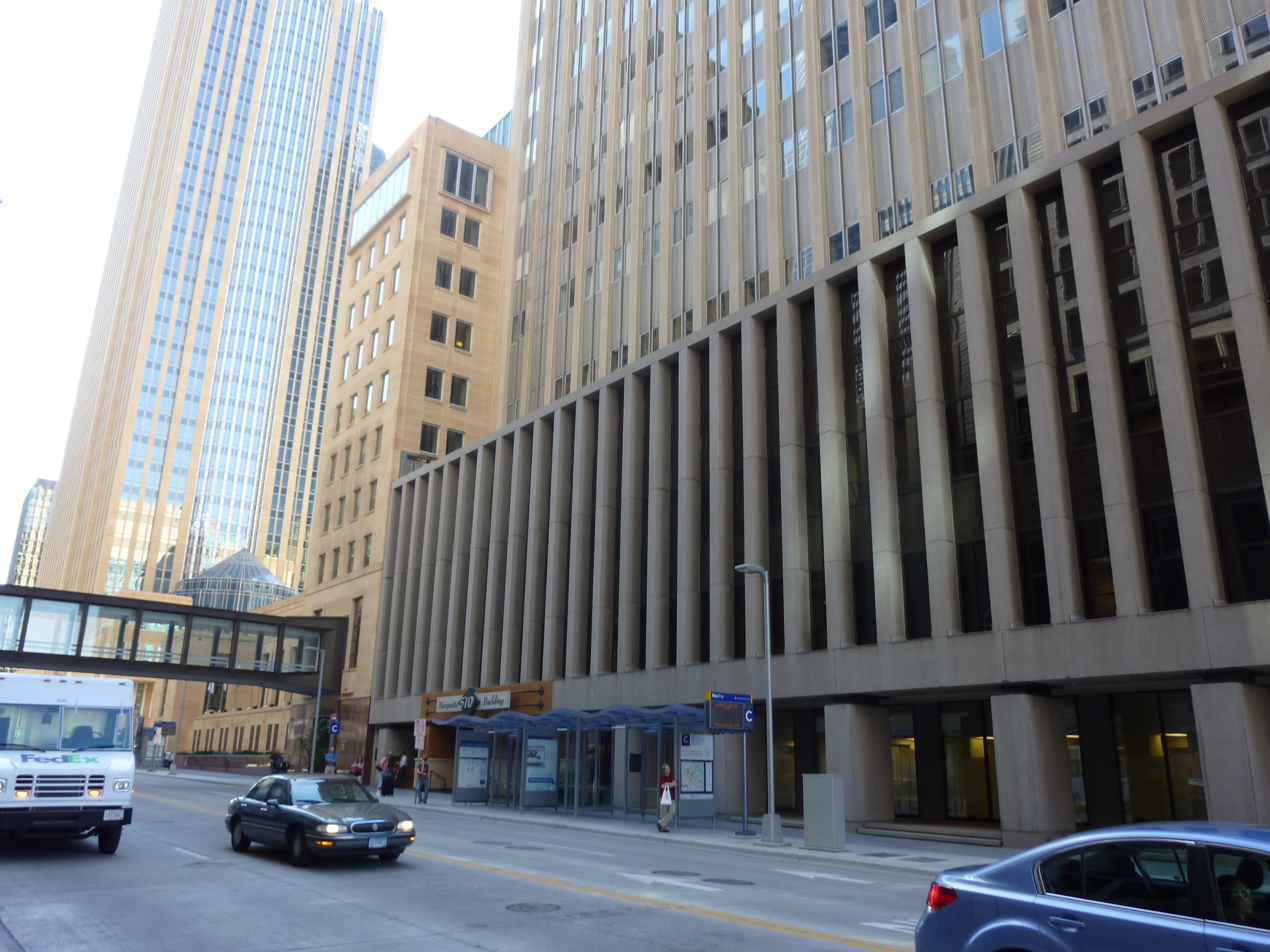
- 510 Marquette was the first headquarters of the Federal Reserve Bank of Minneapolis

General information
- Status: Completed
- Location: 510 Marquette Ave. Minneapolis, Minnesota
- Coordinates: 44°58′41″N 93°16′9″W
- Completed: 1915; 111 years ago
- Operator: CB Richard Ellis

Technical details
- Floor count: 13
- Floor area: 198,552 square feet

Design and construction
- Architect: Cass Gilbert

The 510 Marquette Building is a high-rise office building in downtown Minneapolis, Minnesota. It was the first building for the Federal Reserve Bank of Minneapolis. It was designed by Cass Gilbert, architect of the Minnesota State Capitol building. It is located at 510 Marquette Avenue, at the corner of Marquette Avenue and 5th Street South in Minneapolis, right next to the Nicollet Mall station of the METRO Blue and Green light rail lines, and across from the Soo Line Building.

== History ==
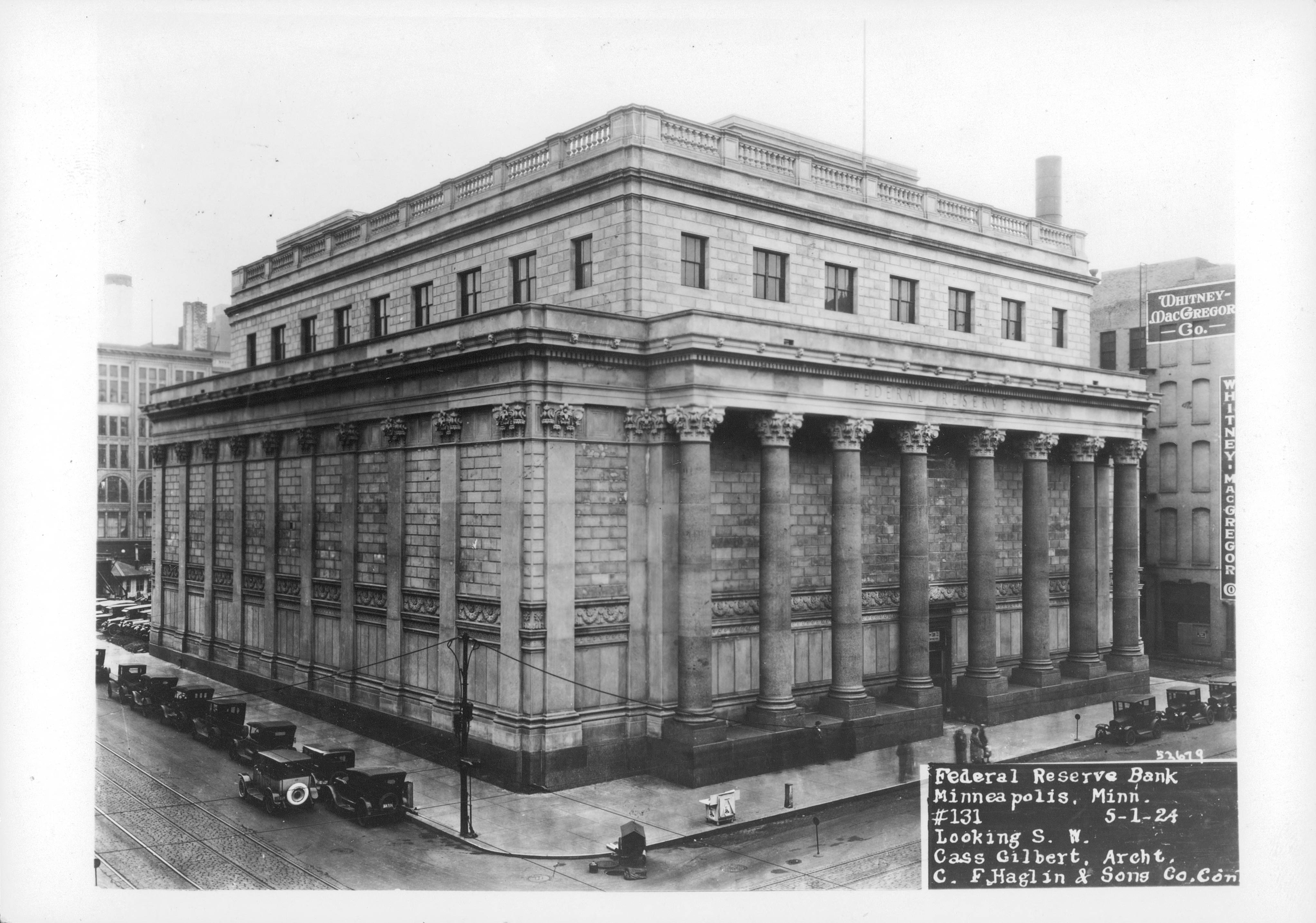
The Minneapolis Federal Reserve Bank, designed by Cass Gilbert, ca. 1925

The building was completed and opened its doors on January 1, 1925. The original structure was built as a 4-story building with sub-basement to house the Ninth District Federal Reserve Bank, which occupied the building for approximately 50 years. The building was unusual in that there were no windows on the lower walls close to the street—from the start, large bricks filled in the spaces where windows would be expected. Only up at the top was anyone able to look out from the building. An additional nine stories were added in 1956 with the completion of floors 5 through 13. The modern superstructure clashed with the granite Roman columns on the building's facade.

After the Fed moved to its second building in 1973, the new owner, a partnership of New York developers, Peter V. Tishman and Jay Marc Schwamm, had the lower portion covered with something that was a better match to the skyscraper "hat" on top. The 3-foot-thick (0.91 m), windowless, lower floors were stripped of the granite and replaced with a "bird cage" limestone facade (designed by Minneapolis architect Robert Cerny) and a totally artificially sustained natural 3,000-square-foot (280 m^{2}) garden of ficus trees and pools of water (designed by San Francisco landscape architectural firm of Lawrence Halprin). At the time it was the largest totally artificially sustained garden within an office building in the United States. It had been modeled after the Ford Foundation Building in New York City, which has a larger garden, but also one that relies to some extent on outside natural light. There was also the need to remove the interior, independently supported five-story vault so that the building could be connected to the adjacent F&M Bank Building, and also become part of the second floor, Minneapolis Skyway System. After a three-year development, the National City Bank of Minneapolis (now part of M&I Bank) moved into the building as its principal tenant. After the renovation, the building received the Minneapolis Committee on the Urban Environment award for contributing the most to Minneapolis's urban environment.

The building was listed for sale in 2011. It was owned by Hart Advisers Inc. of Simsbury, Connecticut who bought it in December 1998 for $20.6 million. In 2011, its largest tenant was RBC Wealth Management which was shifting to nearby RBC Plaza. Opportunity Advisors of Eden Prairie, Minnesota had purchased the building in May 2012 for somewhere around $5-$6 million, about one-fourth of its 1998 selling price.

In 2013, the 510 Marquette building was sold for $6.69 million. At the time it was reported to have 198,552 square feet. It was purchased by Marquette Partners LLC, an affiliate of Minneapolis-based Swervo Development. The seller was OP2 Marquette, an affiliate of Opportunity Advisors.

== See also ==
- Marquette Plaza - The second Minneapolis Federal Reserve Bank building
