= The Marq =

High-rise building in Minneapolis, Minnesota, U.S.

Coordinates: 44.980858°N 93.267773°W

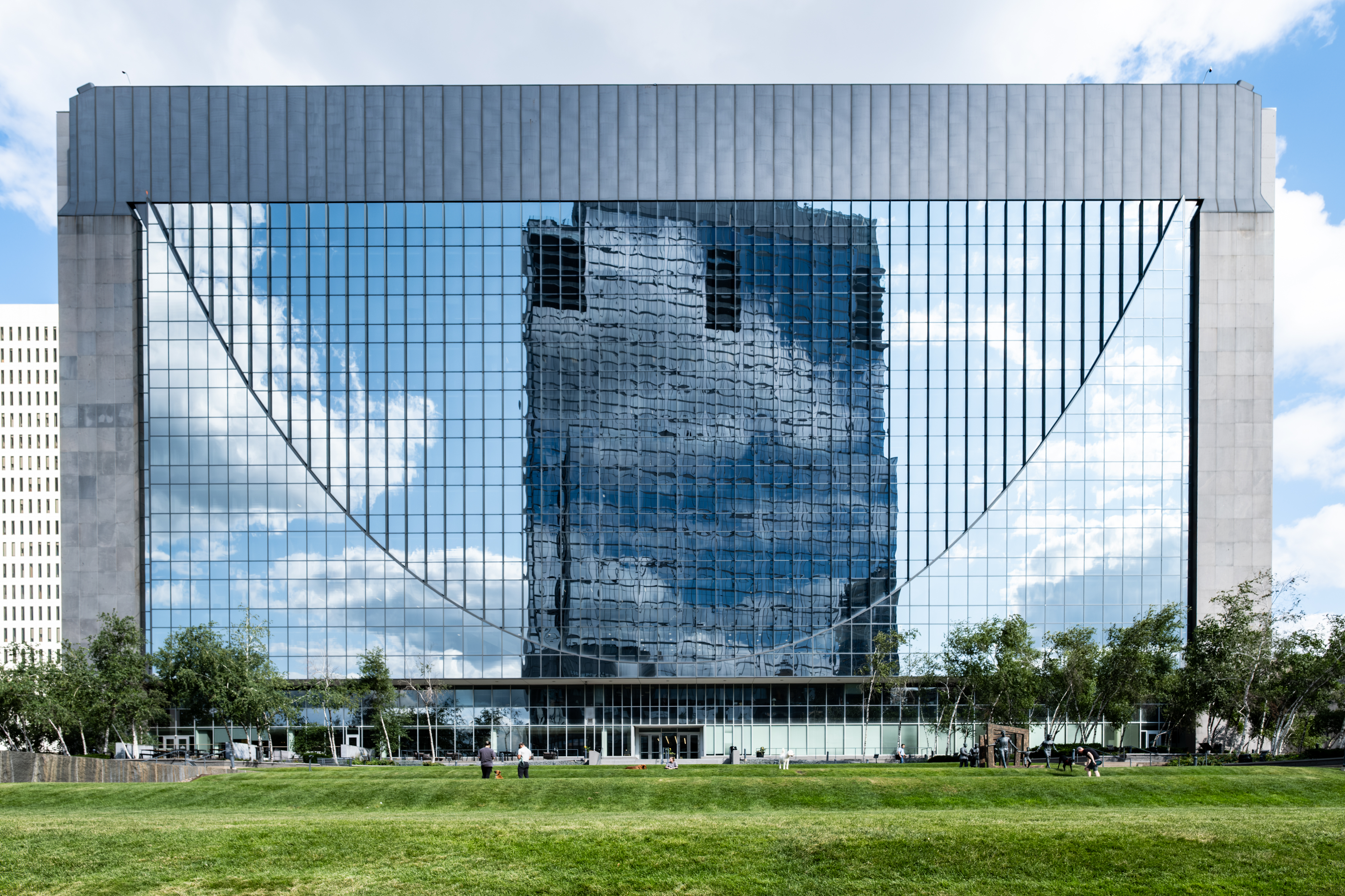
- West view of Marquette Plaza in 2024
- Alternative names: Old Federal Reserve Building

General information
- Architectural style: Structural expressionism
- Location: 250 Marquette Avenue, Minneapolis, Minnesota, U.S.
- Opened: 1973

Design and construction
- Architect: Gunnar Birkerts

Website
- themarq.info

The Marq (formerly Marquette Plaza) is a high-rise building in downtown Minneapolis, Minnesota, United States, located at 250 Marquette Avenue.

== Design ==
Designed by Gunnar Birkerts, it was home to the Federal Reserve Bank of Minneapolis from 1973 to 1997 (hence, many people refer to it as "the old Federal Reserve building"). Designed much like a suspension bridge, most of the original floors are supported by two sets of catenary cables. Underground chambers were used for vault space, and an external elevator shaft was attached on the east face of the building to connect a ground-floor lobby with the rest of the building. There was originally a gap between the lobby and the rest of the above ground structure to emphasize the construction method.

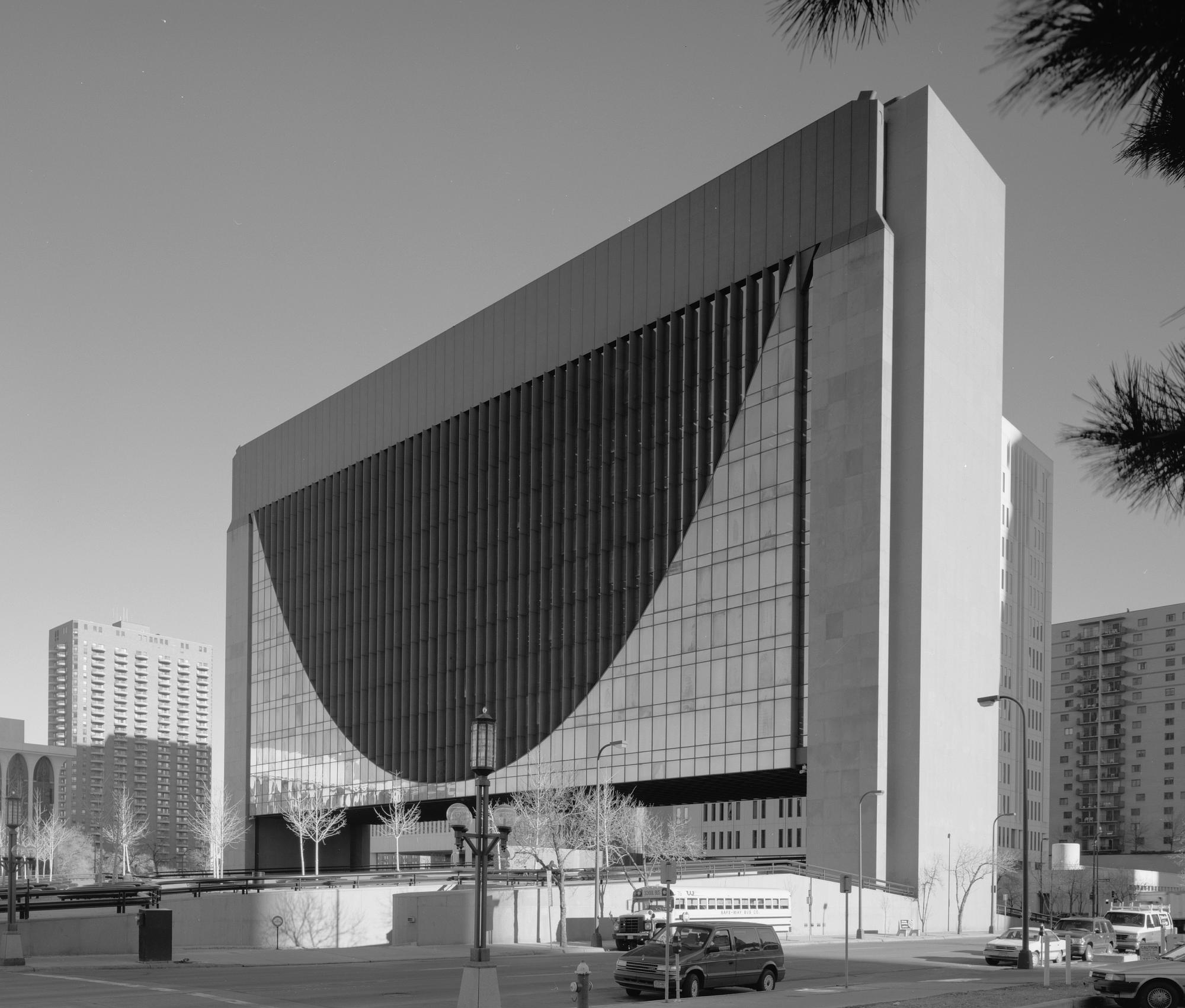
Southwest view of Marquette Plaza in its original configuration with aboveground gap

While the building's design has been highly praised as an engineering achievement, it was plagued with design defects that led to leaky windows and other problems. In addition, asbestos had been heavily used in the building's construction. The Minneapolis Federal Reserve decided to build a new complex a few blocks away rather than renovate the structure, and it passed to private hands. The building was remodeled in 2002 for about US$65 million, a process which included adding office space to the east side and into the aboveground gap, while also converting a concrete plaza into a grassy park. A skyway connection was added to the ING ReliaStar 111 Building.

Early designs for the building included sketches for an addition on top that included an inverted catenary, resulting in a shape resembling an oval. The building is credited with influencing the decision to add an observation bridge with a catenary arch above the dramatic opening in Saudi Arabia's Kingdom Centre. Local design company Ellerbe Becket contributed to the work for that structure.

== Re-emergence ==
Marquette Plaza re-established its status in 2011 as it became the first downtown Minneapolis building to earn LEED Platinum certification. This status, granted by the U.S. Green Building Council (USGBC), is the highest level of LEED certification to achieve and illustrates the building’s transformation and leadership in the greening of downtown. Marquette Plaza made its mark as the first large multi-tenant building in Minnesota to receive Platinum certification, due to a series of efforts and implementations set forth by property manager Base Management and 23 building tenants, which include: The Scoular Company, Federal Government agencies, Foley & Mansfield, Meet Minneapolis and CenturyLink. Platinum certification is more challenging to receive when multiple tenants are involved in the process. The sustainability consultant that helped Marquette Plaza attain LEED Platinum certification was Sustology, a Minneapolis-based sustainable developer and consultant with its headquarters in Marquette Plaza. The property was up for recertification ins 2016 and again attained LEED Platinum status with the help of consultant Sustology and is currently the only LEED Platinum Certified building in Minnesota as of 2016.

In 2019, after the completion of a $7 million renovation, the building was renamed The Marq.

== See also ==
- 510 Marquette Building - The first building for the Federal Reserve Bank of Minneapolis
