= Mark G. Swenson =

American architect

- Born: November 29, 1949 (age 76); Minneapolis
- Education: University of Minnesota
- Occupation: Architect
- Awards: Fellow of the American Institute of Architects, College of Fellows (2008)
- Practice: Elness Swenson Graham Architects (ESG)
- Projects: Foshay Tower, Farmers and Mechanics Savings Bank, Milwaukee Road Depot
- Website: www.esgarch.com

Mark G. Swenson (born November 29, 1949) is an American architect and founding principal of Elness Swenson Graham Architects Inc. (ESG Architecture & Design) based in Minneapolis, Minnesota.

== Biography ==
Swenson was born in Minneapolis, Minnesota on November 29, 1949. He attended Minnehaha Academy, where he graduated in 1967. He won an Evans Scholarship from Western Golf Association, which paid his way through college.

Swenson attended the University of Minnesota where he earned both a Bachelor of Environmental Design degree and a Masters of Architecture degree. Upon graduation he taught at the School of Architecture at the University of Minnesota for nine years while maintaining a full-time architectural position at a local firm, Ellerbe Architects.

He later moved to BRW Architects (ESG, Elness Swenson Graham Architects Inc., since 1997), where he served as its president from 1990 to 2016). In 1984, Swenson and David Graham completed their first project, a 270-room Radisson convention center hotel in Lansing, Michigan.

ESG became one of the largest architectural studios in Minnesota and specializes in hotel design. By 2017, it has designed more than 70 hotels. The firm re-designed several buildings listed on the National Register of Historic Places in Minneapolis: the W Hotel / Foshay Tower (2008), Westin Hotel / Farmers and Mechanics Savings Bank (2007), Midtown Exchange (2006) and Milwaukee Road Depot. These projects earned him Career Achievement Award from the Preservation Alliance of Minnesota.

Swenson held several positions at the American Institute of Architects, serving as a member of the AIA Minnesota Board of Directors from 2001 to 2007 and AIA North Central States Regional Director from 2011 to 2013. In 2008, Swenson was elected a Fellow of the American Institute of Architects (FAIA.) Only 3% of AIA members have received this distinction.

== Awards and recognition ==
Year	Recognition	Recognition type	Awarding body
2008	Fellow of the American Institute of Architects, College of Fellows	Fellowship	American Institute of Architects
2009	Career Achievement Award	Award	Preservation Alliance of Minnesota
2018	Albert Nelson Marquis Lifetime Achievement Award	Award	Marquis Who's Who
