= Jump River Town Hall =

- McKinley Town Hall
- U.S. National Register of Historic Places
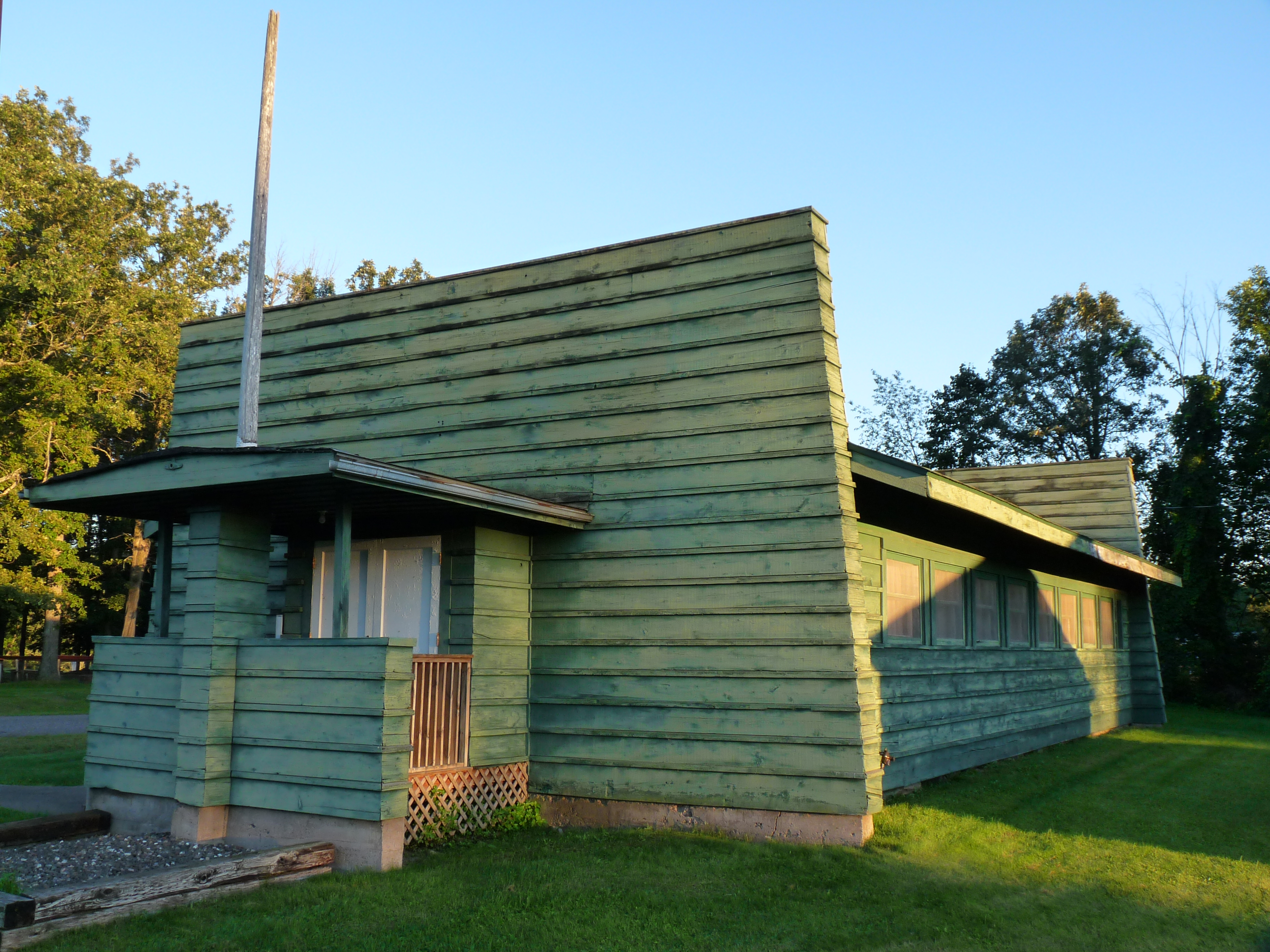
- McKinley Town Hall in Jump River, August 2010

- Location within Wisconsin Location within the United States
- Location: S of WI 73, Jump River, Wisconsin
- Coordinates: 45°21′7″N 90°48′10″W
- Area: less than one acre
- Built: 1915
- Architect: Purcell & Elmslie
- Architectural style: Prairie School
- NRHP reference No.: 74000127
- Added to NRHP: March 28, 1974

The McKinley Town Hall is a historic Prairie School building located in Jump River, Wisconsin. Built in 1915, it was designed by the noted Prairie School architects Purcell & Elmslie, and is significant as the smallest public building they designed. It was listed on the National Register of Historic Places in 1974.

The building listed on the NRHP as the "Jump River Town Hall" is actually the town hall of the town of McKinley. The town hall of the town of Jump River is the larger stone building built by the WPA a few hundred yards to the east. Both lie in the hamlet of Jump River - hence the confusion.

== Background ==
In 1915, when the McKinley town hall was built, McKinley was a rather remote corner of northern Wisconsin. Pine/river logging was largely done. Hardwood/railroad logging was still going pretty well, and some of the cut-over forties and eighties were being taken by farmers and settlers. The town of McKinley had been split from the town of Westboro in 1902 and included what is now McKinley and what is now the town of Jump River.

Purcell & Elmslie was a prominent architecture firm of the Prairie School, perhaps second only to Frank Lloyd Wright. Key ideas of this style were that America should have its own original architecture, not aping older styles from Europe like Queen Anne, and that a building should fit with the landscape, often by emphasizing horizontal lines to suggest the wide-open prairies.

== Design ==
William Gray Purcell designed the town hall with a trapezoidal facade at each end, rising up well above the roof-line. Between those ends runs a long gable roof with wide eaves and a band of windows down each side. At the north end is an entry porch and flagpole. The exterior walls are covered by what looks like horizontal board and batten, stained green. The interior is one long hall with two small offices. Today the town hall is little changed from the time it was built, and is still used for town meetings and voting.

Purcell wrote about his design of the building as follows: "I used the horizontal interlocking system of broad boards and fillets and gave the building something of the feeling of the old log lumber camp buildings. Whether the Jump River populace enjoyed having their town hall look like a wanigan instead of a little cracker box, I do not know, but it looked comfortable and practical."

Of particular note is the building's small size. One of the ideas of the Prairie School was that "serious architectural design can be applied to even the least-grand commissions." The only other public building designed by Purcell and Elmslie is the Kasson Municipal Building in Minnesota. The McKinley Town Hall is much smaller - basically a one-room building - but with a unique, attractive design that exemplifies the Prairie Style's progressive ideal.

== See also ==
- National Register of Historic Places listings in Taylor County, Wisconsin
