= Dr. J. W. S. Gallagher House =

Historic house in Minnesota, United States

- U.S. National Register of Historic Places
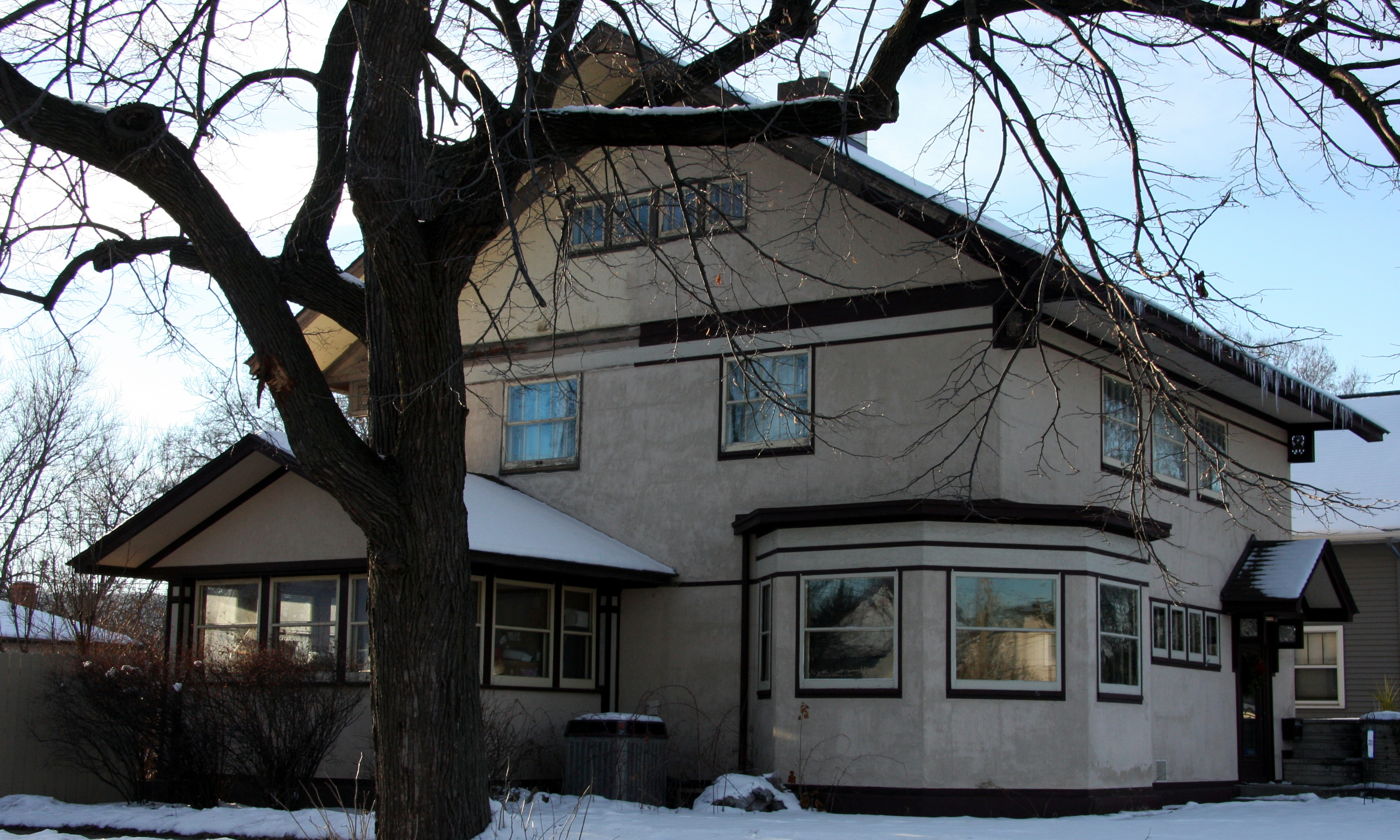
- The Dr. J. W. S. Gallagher House from the east

- Location within Minnesota Location within the United States
- Location: 451 W. Broadway St., Winona, Minnesota
- Coordinates: 44°3′8.1″N 91°38′56.4″W
- Area: Less than one acre
- Built: 1913
- Architect: Purcell & Elmslie
- Architectural style: Prairie School
- NRHP reference No.: 84000245
- Added to NRHP: November 8, 1984

The Dr. J. W. S. Gallagher House is a 1913 Prairie School house in Winona, Minnesota, United States, designed by the architectural firm of Purcell & Elmslie. The house was listed on the National Register of Historic Places in 1984 for having local significance in the theme of architecture.

== Description ==
The Dr. J. W. S. Gallagher House is essentially rectangular, with a gabled porch on the side and another on the rear. It is two stories with side gables, a low-pitched roof, and wide eaves. The house has stucco walls with cypress trim. Architectural details include a five-sided bay window on the northeast corner, sawn wood decorations, and came glasswork windows. It was nominated for being a well-preserved example of the modest residential commissions that typified Purcell & Elmslie's work, despite their acclaim for more prominent projects such as Merchants National Bank in downtown Winona.

== See also ==
- National Register of Historic Places listings in Winona County, Minnesota
