= Purcell & Elmslie =

American architectural practice

Purcell & Elmslie (P&E) was the most widely known iteration of a progressive American architectural practice. P&E was the second most commissioned firm of the Prairie School, after Frank Lloyd Wright. The firm in all iterations was active from 1907 to 1921, with their most famous work being done between 1913 and 1921.

== History ==
The firms consisted of three partnerships: Purcell and Feick (1907–10); Purcell, Feick, and Elmslie (1910–12), and Purcell and Elmslie (1913–21). Elmslie had joined the Minneapolis-based firm in 1907, at the request of Purcell. The architects were commissioned for work in twenty-two states, participated in the competition for the National Parliament Buildings in Canberra, Australia, and prepared plans for a large institutional church, or Y.M.C.A., in Hunan, China.

The two principals of the firm, William Gray Purcell (1880–1965) and George Grant Elmslie (1869–1952) both eventually received Fellowships in the College of the American Institute of Architects. George Feick Jr. who was son of George Feick, an Ohio contractor, was the original partner with Purcell. Purcell and Feick had been students together at Cornell University. They rejoined to tour in Europe together during 1906-1907 and then came to Minneapolis to open their partnership. The firm had offices in Chicago, Philadelphia, and Minneapolis. A number of works by each of the partnerships are listed on the National Register of Historic Places.

== Notable commissions ==
- Steven House (1909), Eau Claire, Wisconsin
- Dr. Ward Beebe House (1912), Saint Paul, Minnesota
- Josephine Crane Bradley summer residence (Bradley Bungalow) (1912) Woods Hole, Massachusetts
- Edison Shop (1912) Chicago, Illinois
- Merchants National Bank (1912), Winona, Minnesota
- Edna S. Purcell House (1913), Minneapolis, Minnesota
- Woodbury County Courthouse (1918), Sioux City, Iowa William L. Steele, Architect, Purcell & Elmslie, Associated Architects (George Grant Elmslie, designing architect)

Works include (with attribution):

=== Works by Purcell & Feick ===
- Feick Building, built 1909, at 158-160 E. Market St. Sandusky, OH (Purcell & Feick), NRHP-listed
- Steven House, built 1909, at 606 Second Ave. Eau Claire, WI (Purcell & Feick), NRHP-listed
- Stewart Memorial Presbyterian Church, built 1910, at 116 E. 32nd St. Minneapolis, MN (Purcell & Feick), NRHP-listed

=== Works by Purcell, Feick & Elmslie ===
- A. B. C. Dodd House, built 1910, at 310 3rd Ave. Charles City, IA (Purcell, Feick & Elmslie), NRHP-listed
- Two or three works in the NRHP-listed Bismarck Cathedral Area Historic District, roughly bounded by Hannifan and N 1st Sts., Aves. C and A West Bismarck, ND (Purcell, Feick & Elmslie), NRHP-listed, specifically the Prairie School residences at 120 Avenue A West, at 610 Raymond Street, and at 402 Avenue B West. The Patrick E. Byrne House (120 Avenue A West) was built in 1912; the Timothy R. Atkinson House (402 Avenue B West) was built c.1910.
- Merchants National Bank, built in 1912, at 102 E. 3rd St. Winona, MN (Purcell, Feick & Elmslie), NRHP-listed
- Dr. Oscar Owre House, built 1912, at 2625 Newton Ave., S., Minneapolis, MN (Purcell, Feick & Elmslie), NRHP-listed
- Merton S. Goodnow House, built 1913, at 446 S. Main St. Hutchinson, MN (Purcell, Feick & Elmslie), NRHP-listed
- Charles and Grace Parker House, built 1913, at 4829 Colfax Ave. S. Minneapolis, MN (Purcell, Feick & Elmslie), NRHP-listed
- Dr. John H. Adair House, built 1913, at 322 E. Vine St. Owatonna, MN (Purcell, Feick & Elmslie), NRHP-listed
- Madison State Bank, Madison, Minnesota, built 1913, razed 1968

=== Works by Purcell & Elmslie ===
- One or more works in College Hills Historic District, roughly bounded by Colombia Rd., Amherst Dr., Bowdoin Rd., Corporate Limit, University Bay, and Harvard Dr. Shorewood Hills, WI (Purcell and Elmslie), NRHP-listed
- Community House, First Congregational Church, 310 Broadway Eau Claire, WI (Purcell & Elmslie), NRHP-listed
- Exchange State Bank, NW corner of Main and 1st Sts. Grand Meadow, MN (Purcell & Elmslie), NRHP-listed
- First National Bank (Rhinelander, Wisconsin), 8 W. Davenport St. Rhinelander, WI (Purcell & Elmslie), NRHP-listed
- First National Bank of Adams, 322 Main St. Adams, MN (Purcell & Elmslie), NRHP-listed
- First State Bank of LeRoy, Main St. and Broadway LeRoy, MN (Purcell & Elmslie), NRHP-listed
- Dr. J. W. S. Gallagher House, 451 W. Broadway St. Winona, MN (Purcell & Elmslie), NRHP-listed
- Jump River Town Hall, S of WI 73 Jump River, WI (Purcell & Elmslie), NRHP-listed
- Kasson Municipal Building, 12 W. Main Kasson, MN (Purcell & Elmslie), NRHP-listed
- Mrs. Richard Polson House, N of Spooner Spooner, WI (Purcell & Elmslie), NRHP-listed
- William Gray Purcell House, 2328 Lake Pl. Minneapolis, MN (Purcell & Elmslie), NRHP-listed
- Windego Park Auditorium/Open Air Theater, between S. Ferry St. and Rum River Anoka, MN (Purcell & Elmslie), NRHP-listed
- Woodbury County Courthouse, 7th and Douglas Sts. Sioux City, IA (Purcell & Elmslie), NRHP-listed

== Photo gallery ==
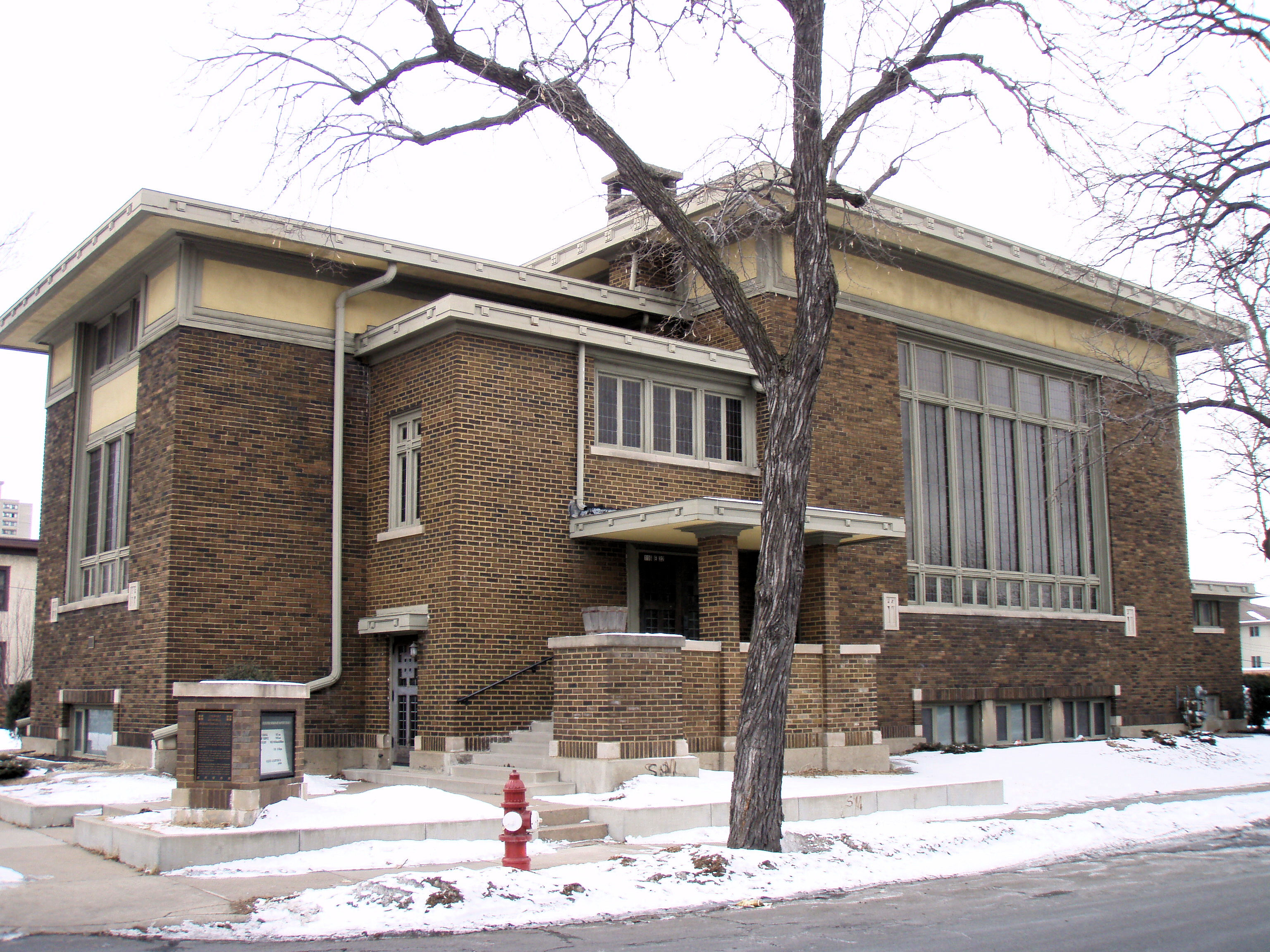
Stewart Memorial Presbyterian Church; Minneapolis, Minnesota 1910, Purcell & Feick

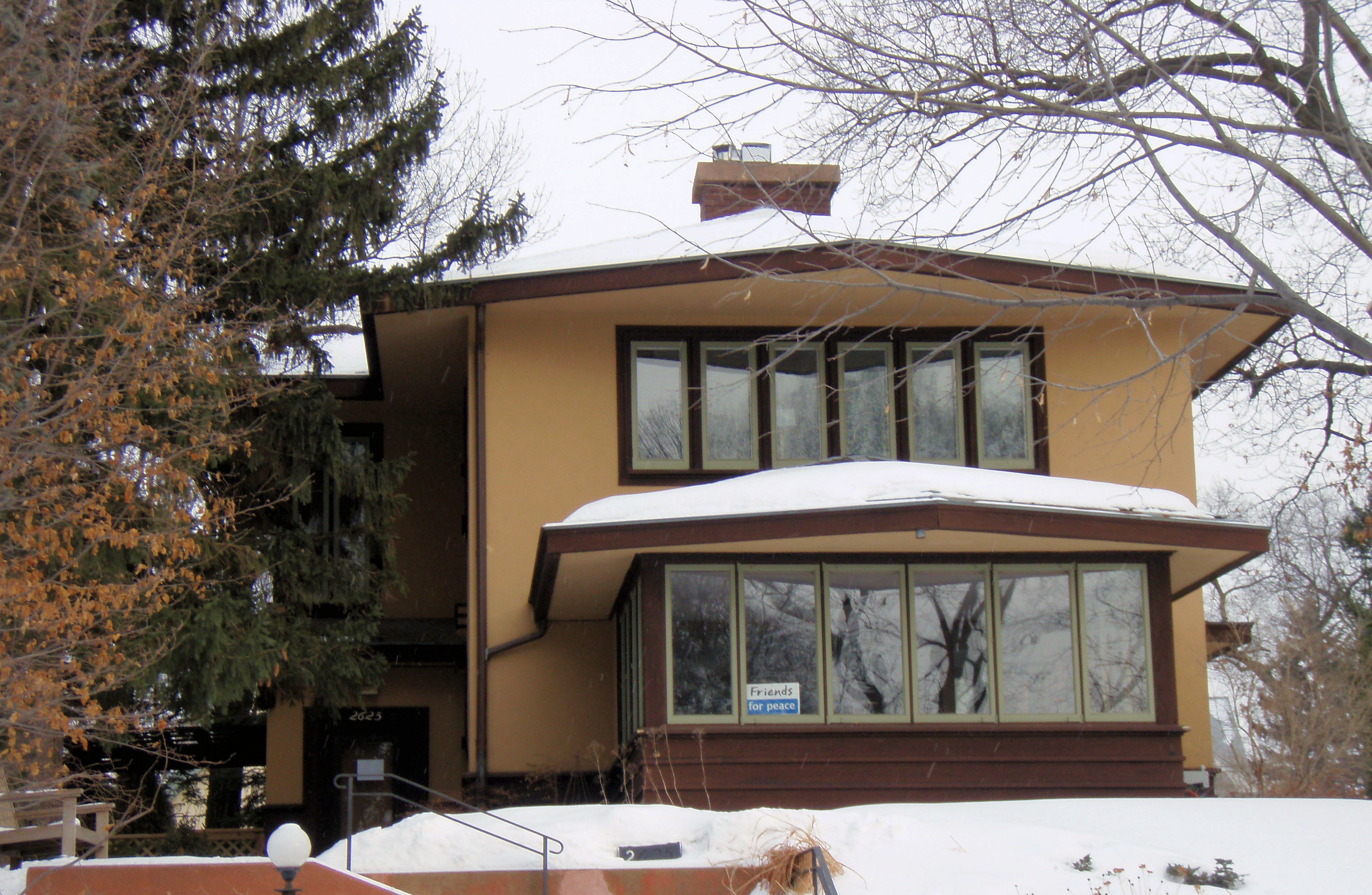
Oscar Owre House; Minneapolis, Minnesota 1911

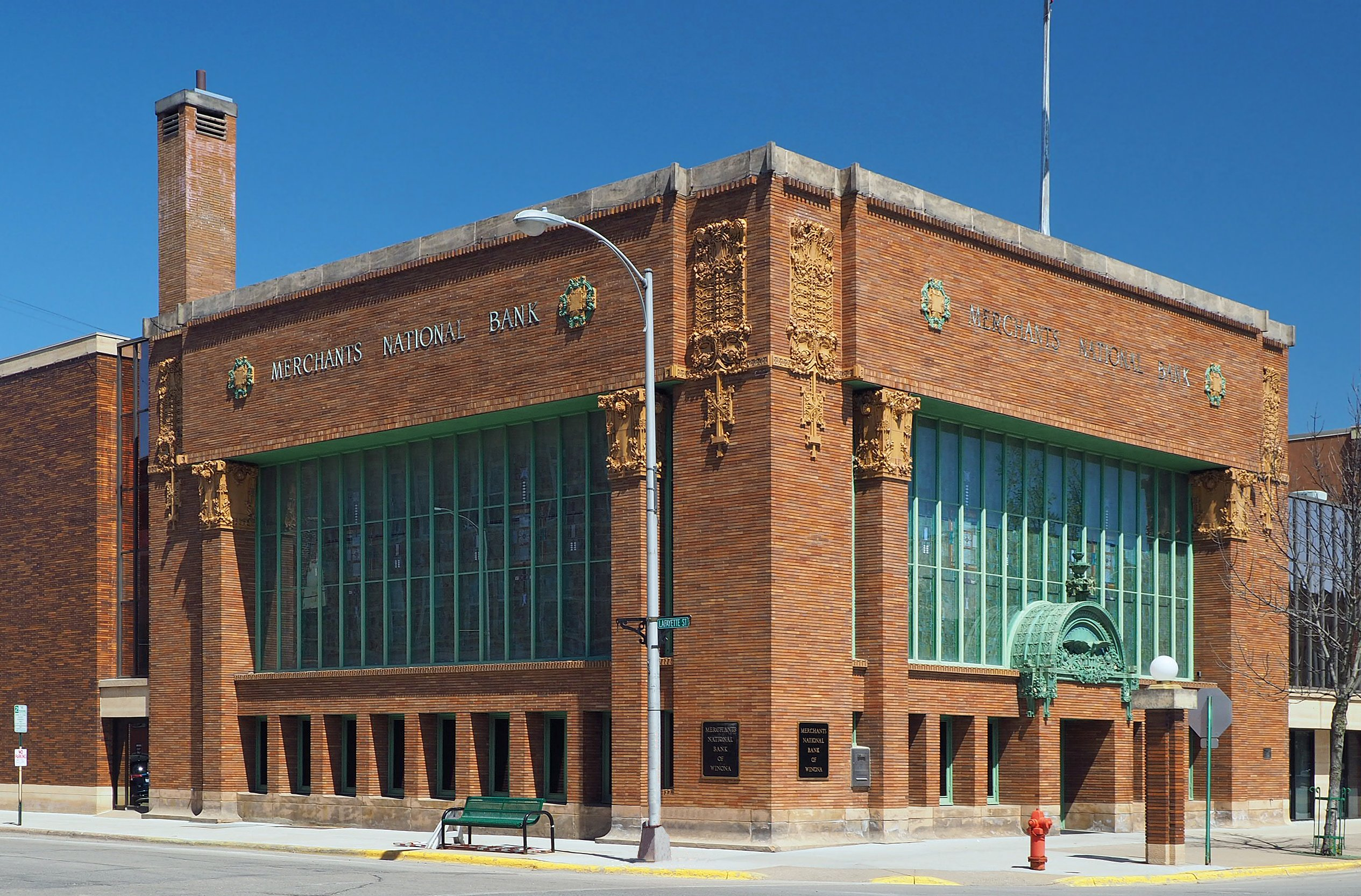
Merchants National Bank (Winona, Minnesota), 1912 by Purcell and Elmslie

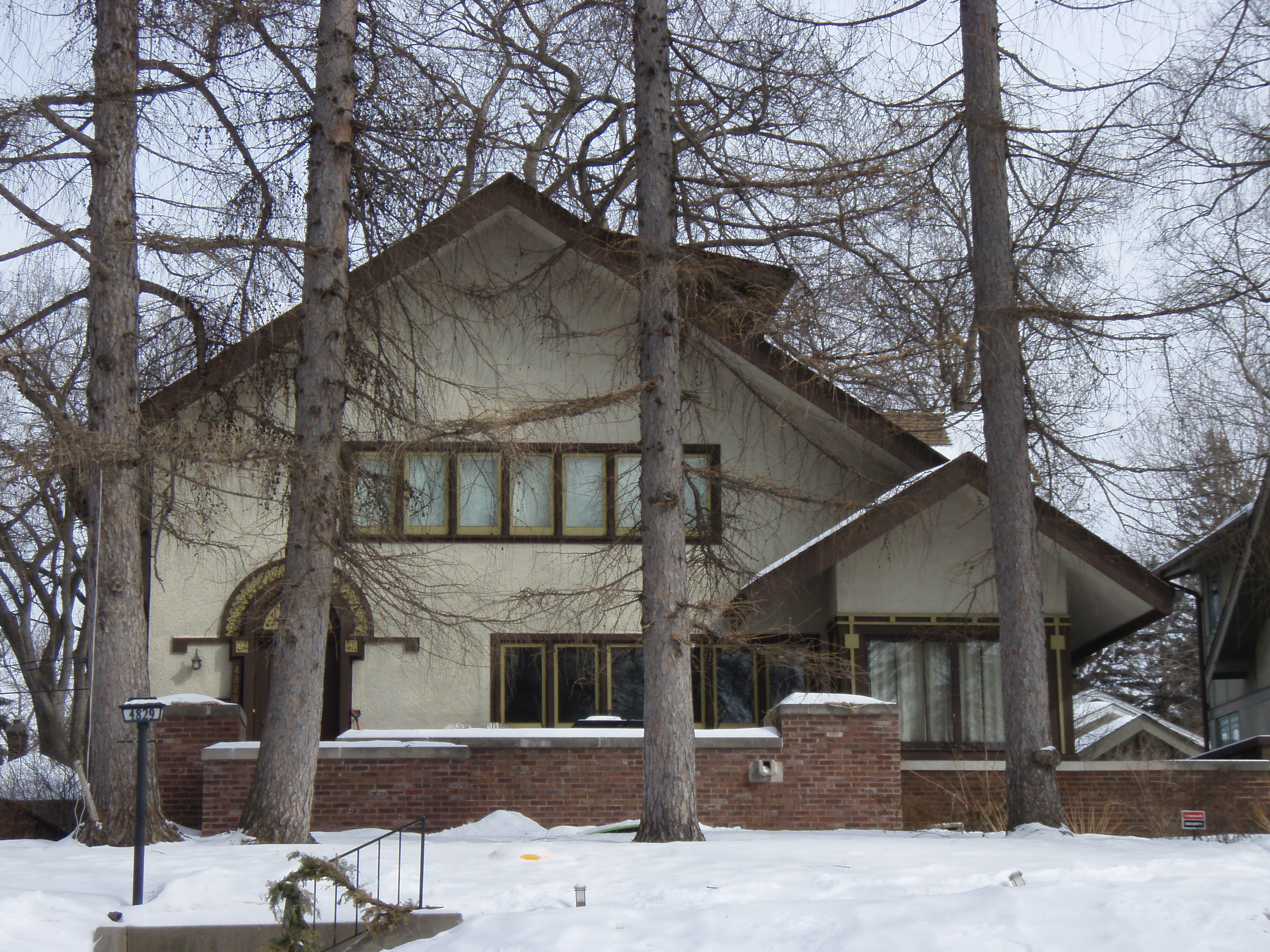
Parker House; Minneapolis, Minnesota 1912-13

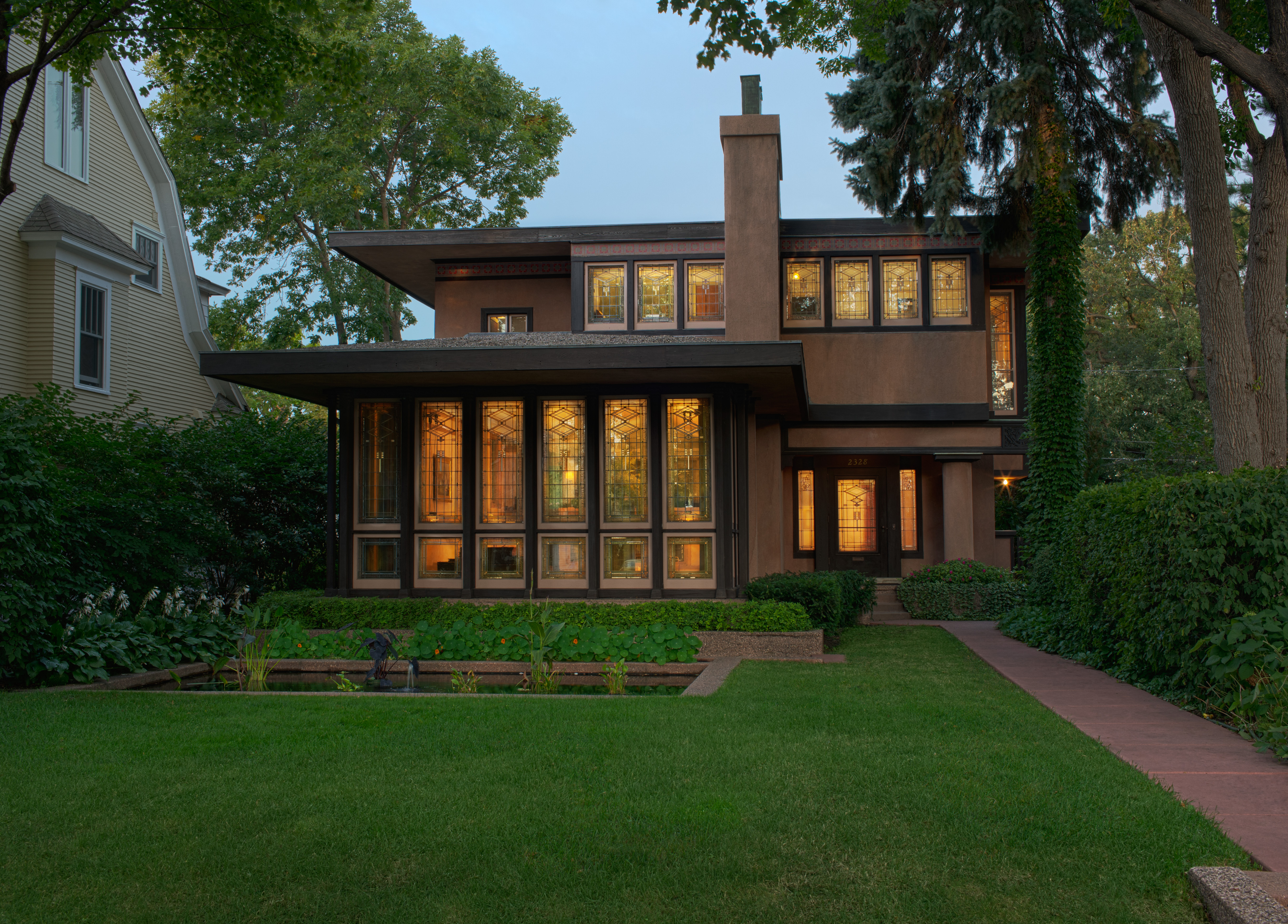
Edna S. Purcell House; Minneapolis, Minnesota 1913 by Purcell and Elmslie

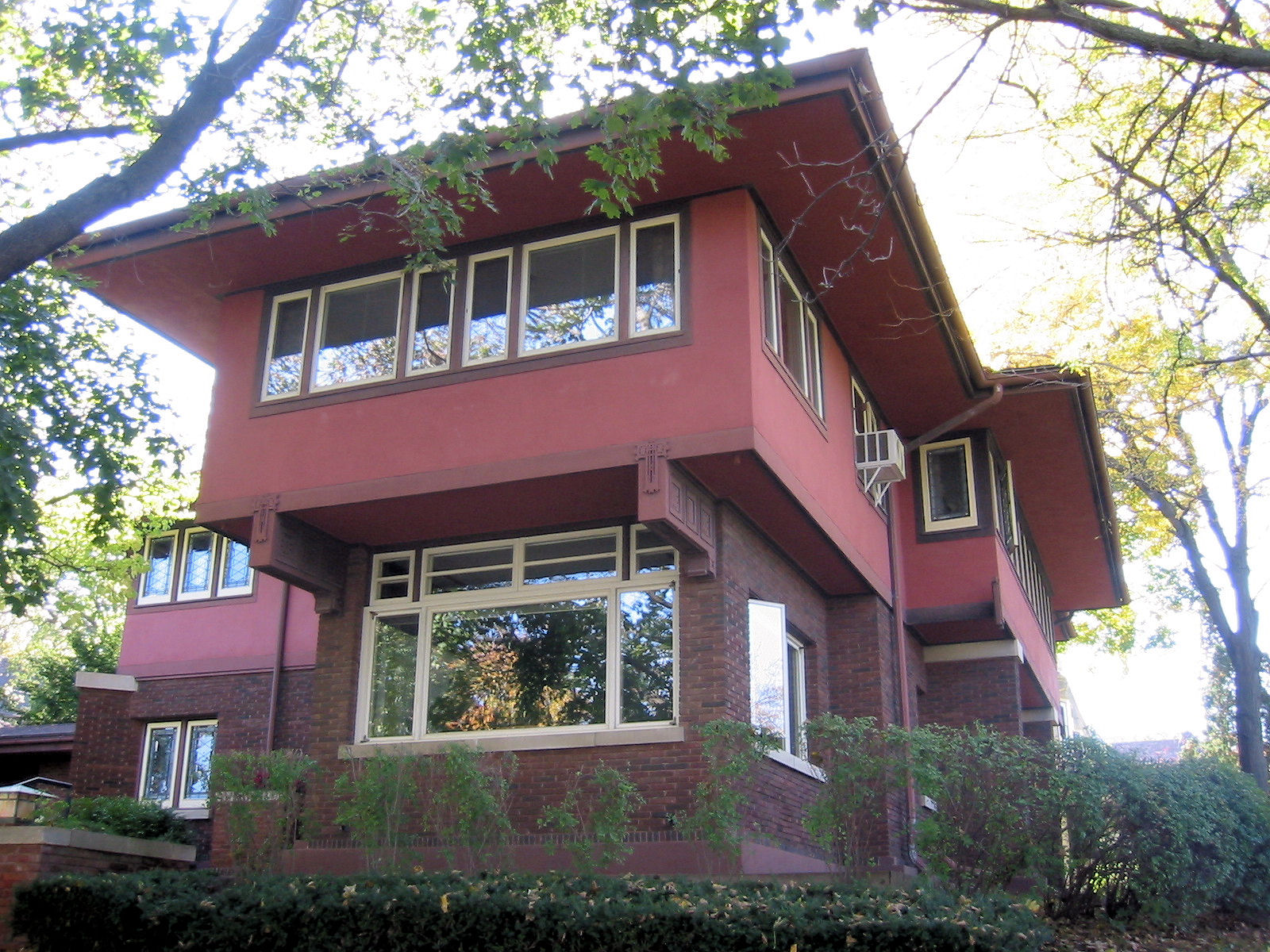
E.S. Hoyt House; Red Wing, Minnesota 1913

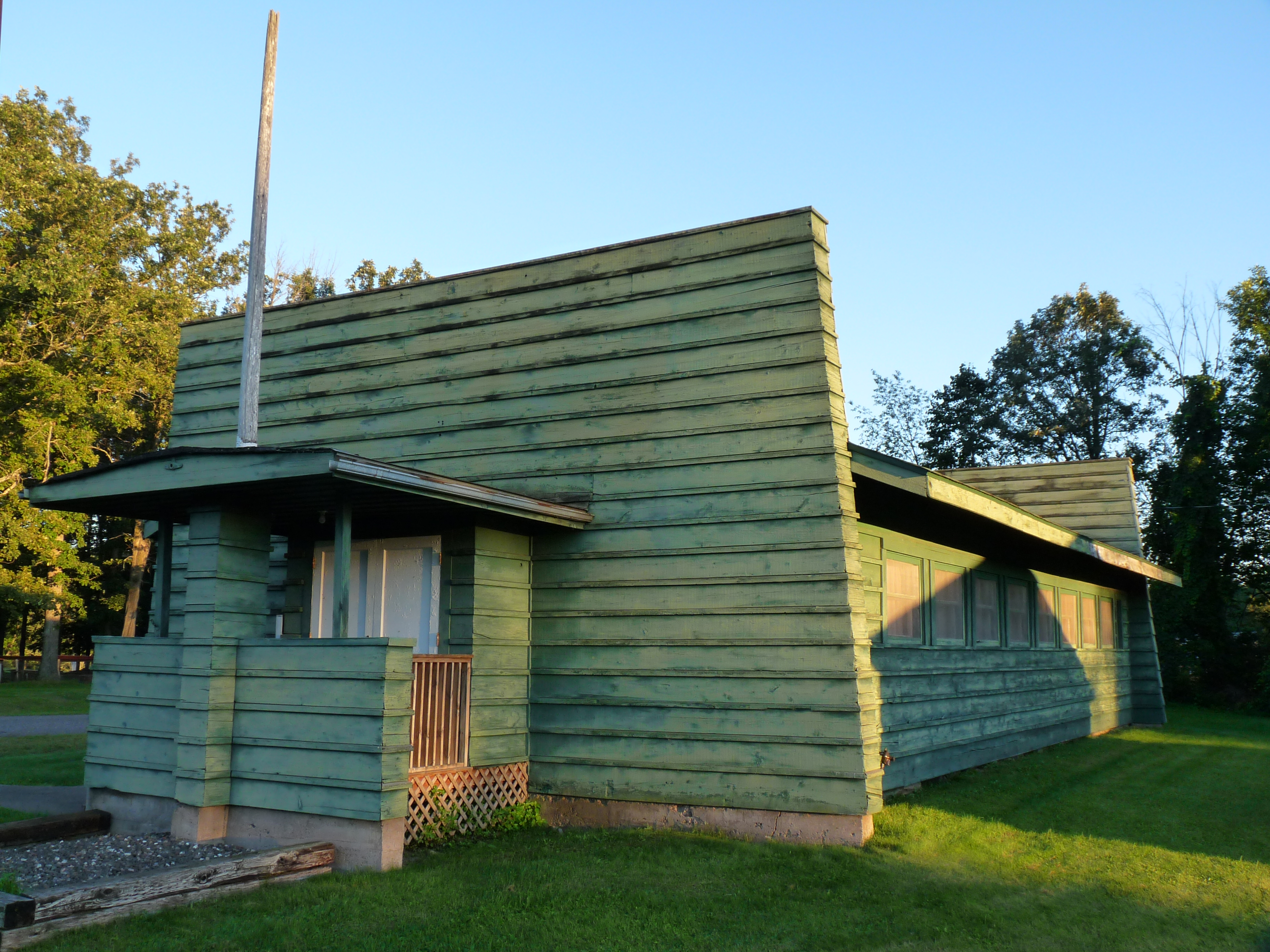
Jump River Town Hall, now The McKinley Town Hall; Jump River, Wisconsin 1915

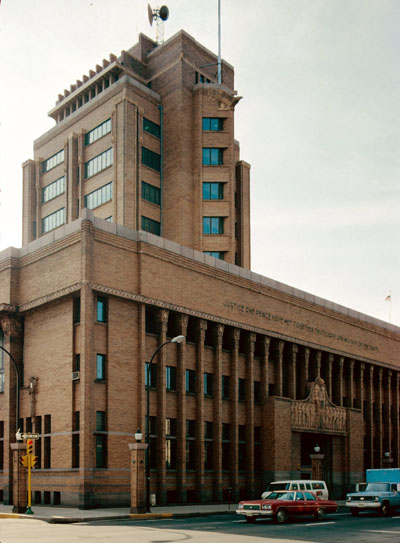
Woodbury County Courthouse; Sioux City, Iowa 1916-18; with associated architect William L. Steele

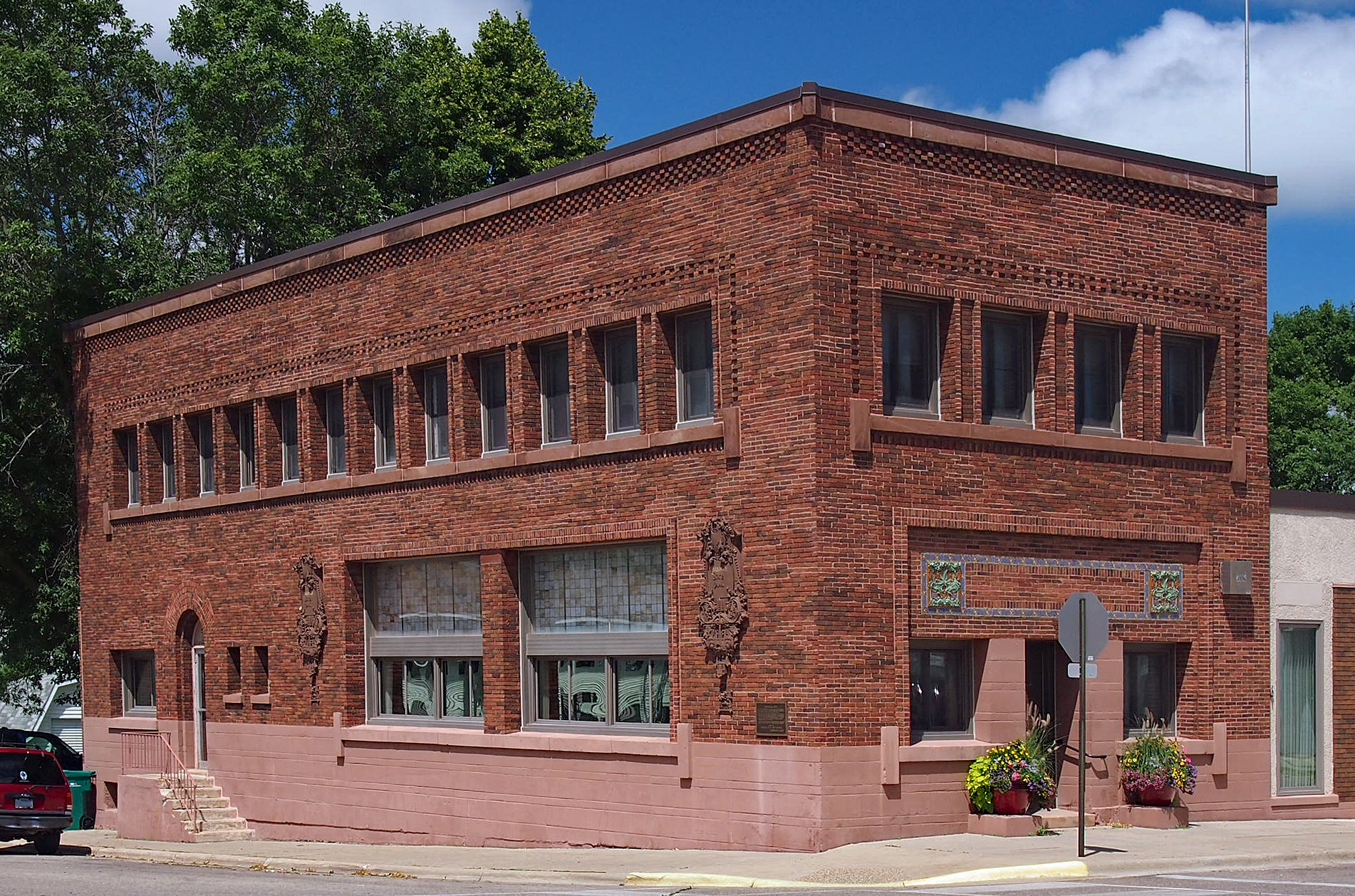
Exchange State Bank in Grand Meadow, Minnesota
