= A. B. C. Dodd House =

Historic house in Iowa, United States

- U.S. National Register of Historic Places
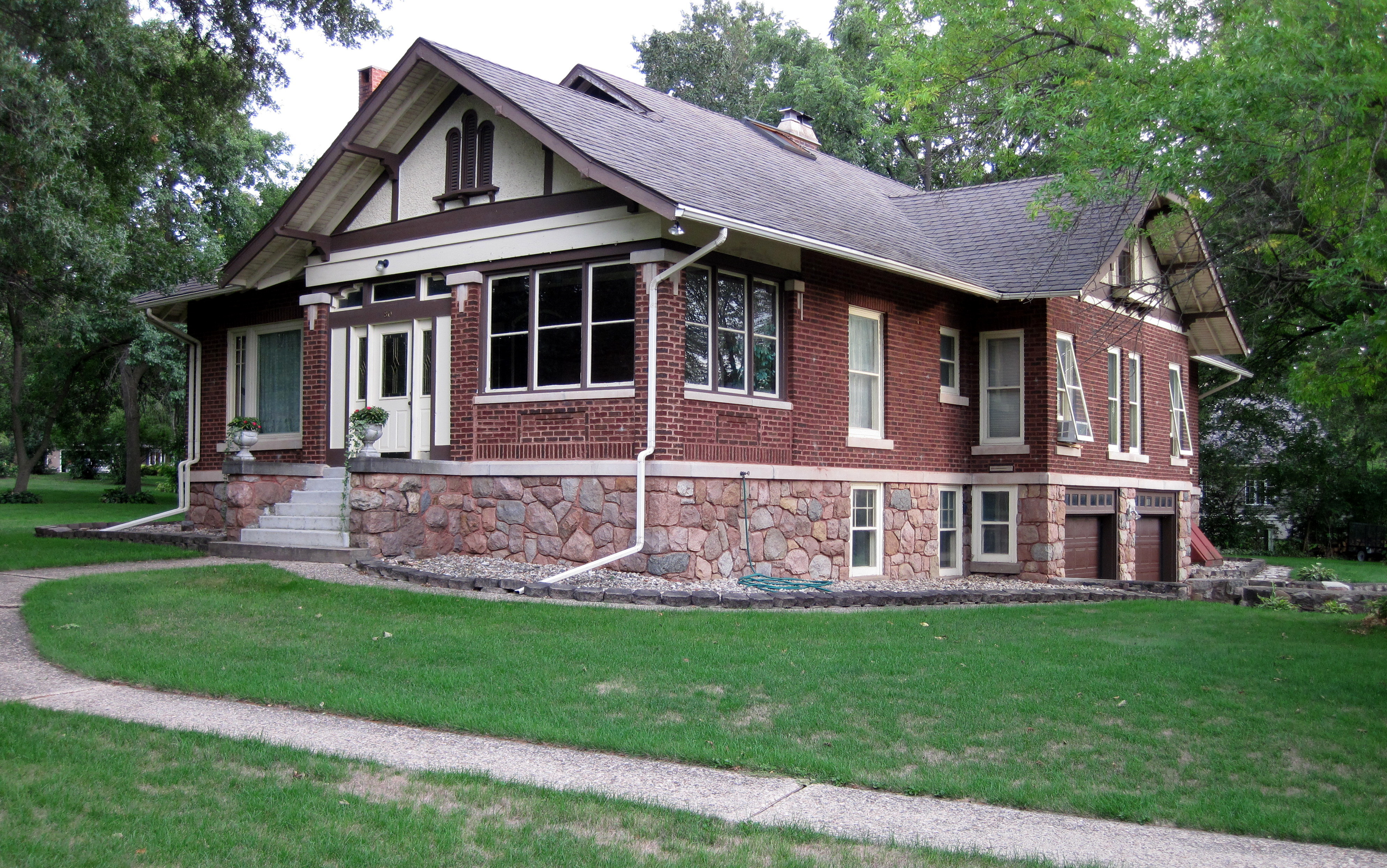
- The ABC Dodd House in 2012

- Location within Iowa Location within the United States
- Location: 310 3rd Ave., Charles City, Iowa
- Coordinates: 43°3′55″N 92°40′6″W
- Area: 0.1 acres (0.040 ha)
- Built: 1910
- Built by: Peterson, Julias
- Architect: Purcell, Feick & Elmslie
- Architectural style: Prairie School
- NRHP reference No.: 78001220
- Added to NRHP: May 22, 1978

The A. B. C. Dodd House (also known as the Thomsen House) is a historic house located at 310 3rd Avenue in Charles City, Iowa.

== Description and history ==
It is a wood-framed, two-story, Prairie School-style house with attic and basement, built in 1910 and designed by architects Purcell and Elmslie, of the Purcell, Feick & Elmslie firm. It has an open plan around a fireplace core. Its 1977 nomination describes it as "deceptively simple in appearance," and, "architecturally, very important as a handsome and inexpensive Prairie School dwelling. Its meticulous maintenance and preservation of the original materials and colors reinforce its significance.

It was listed on the National Register of Historic Places on May 22, 1978.
