= Steven House =

Historic house in Wisconsin, United States

- U.S. National Register of Historic Places
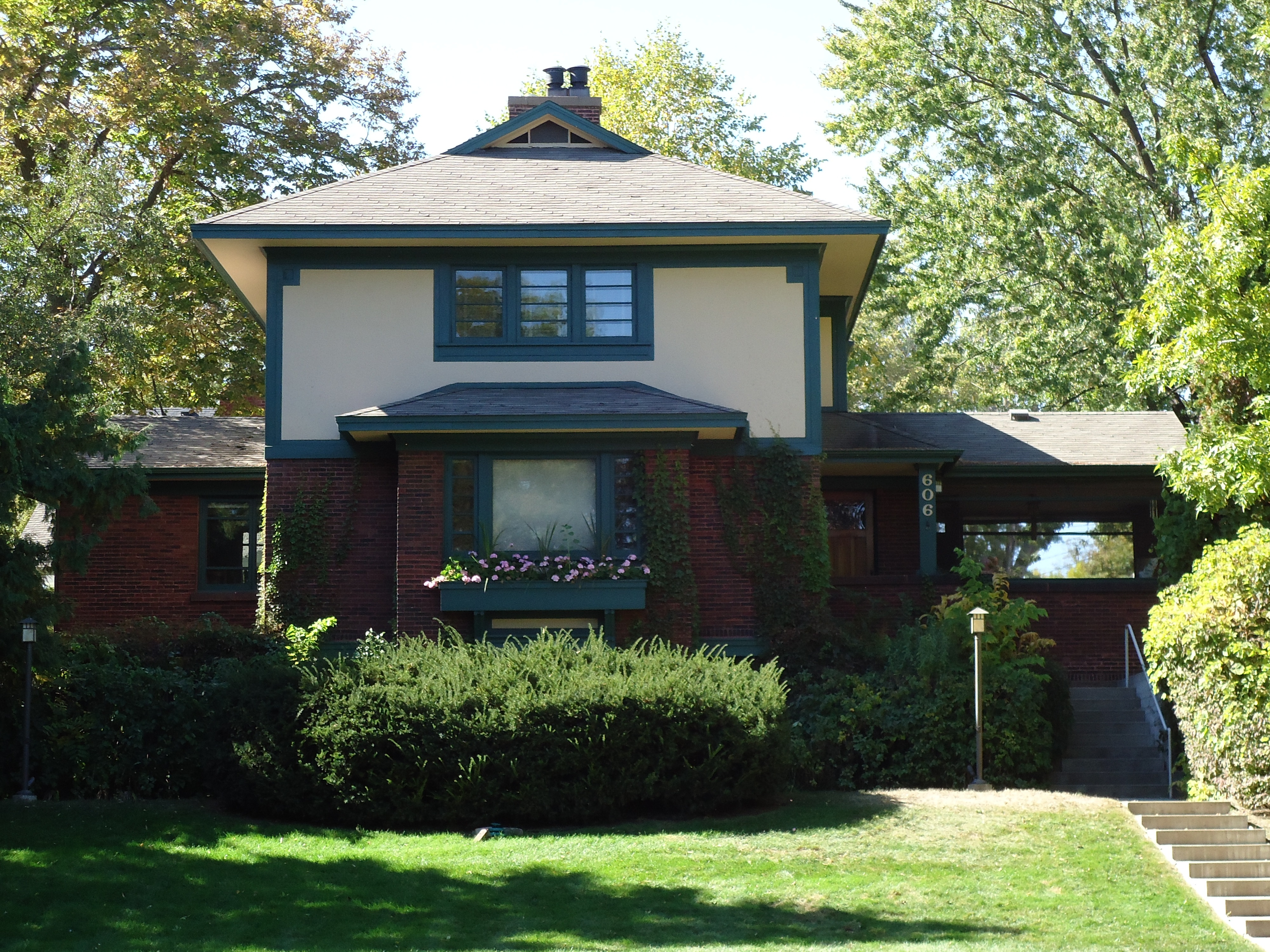
- Location: 606 Second Ave. Eau Claire, Wisconsin
- Coordinates: 44.8063°N 91.50415°W
- Built: 1909
- Architect: Purcell and Feick
- Architectural style: Prairie School
- NRHP reference No.: 82000667
- Added to NRHP: March 1, 1982

The Steven House is located in Eau Claire, Wisconsin. It was added to the National Register of Historic Places in 1982.

== History ==
The house was built for J. D. R. Steven and his wife. It was built in 1909 and designated a historic building by the City of Eau Claire Landmark Commission in 1976.
