= Charles and Grace Parker House =

Historic house in Minnesota, United States

- U.S. National Register of Historic Places
- Minneapolis Landmark
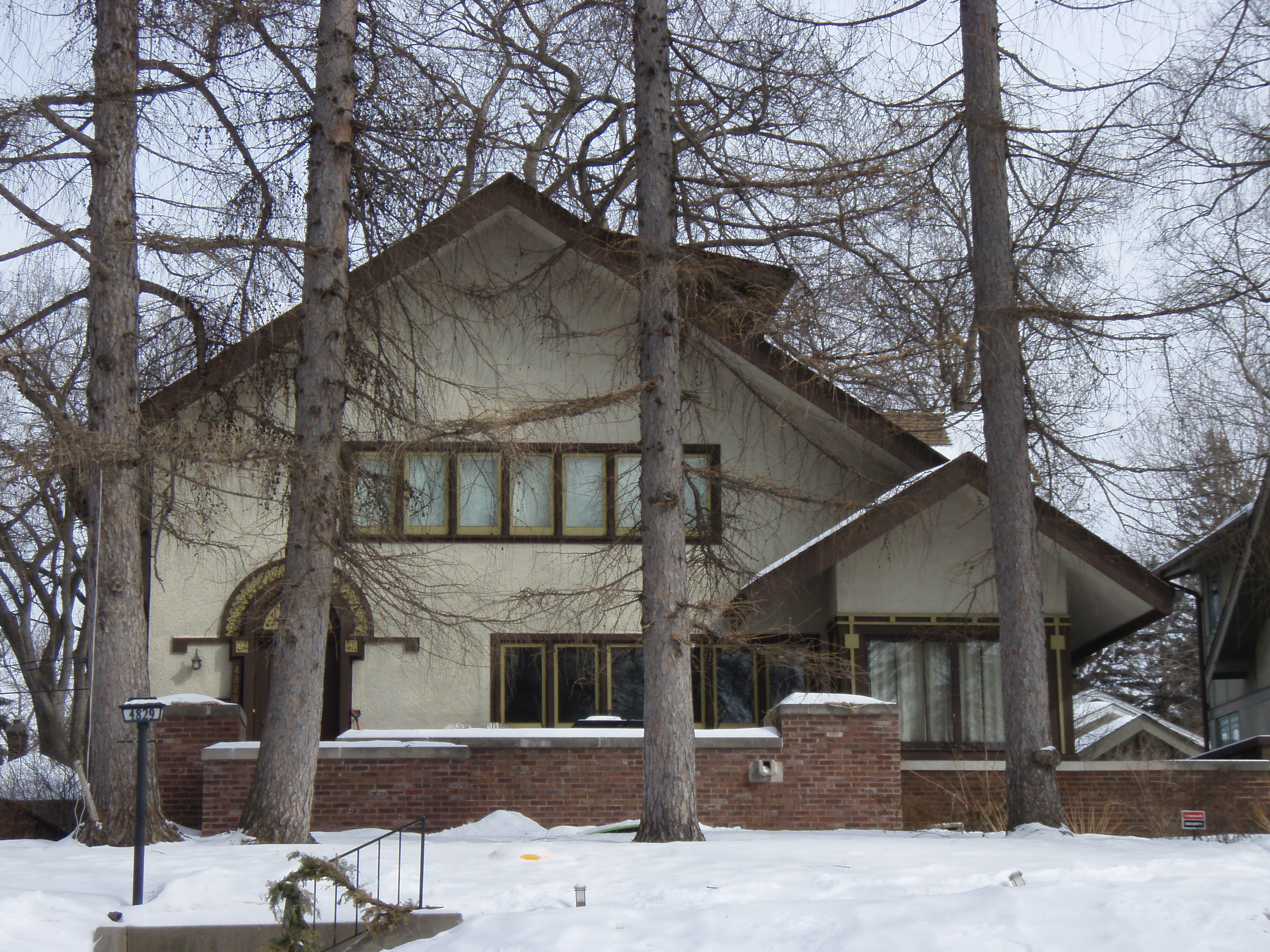

- Location within Minnesota Location within the United States
- Location: 4829 Colfax Avenue South, Minneapolis, Minnesota
- Coordinates: 44°54′55″N 93°17′27″W
- Built: 1913
- Architect: Purcell, Feick & Elmslie
- Architectural style: Prairie School
- NRHP reference No.: 92000699

Significant dates
- Added to NRHP: June 11, 1992
- Designated MPLSL: 1996

The Charles and Grace Parker House is a house in the Lynnhurst neighborhood of Minneapolis, Minnesota southeast of Lake Harriet. It was designed by notable local architects Purcell, Feick & Elmslie in the Prairie School style. Architecture critic Larry Millett calls it one of Purcell and Elmslie's greatest houses, citing the broad gabled roof, the groupings of windows, the side porch, and the detail surrounding the entry. The entrance includes a fretsawn arch and a frieze above the door, with beams and a pair of pendants on either side. George Grant Elmslie designed the leaded glass windows. The house was listed on the National Register of Historic Places in 1992.
