= Windego Park Auditorium/Open Air Theater =

- U.S. National Register of Historic Places
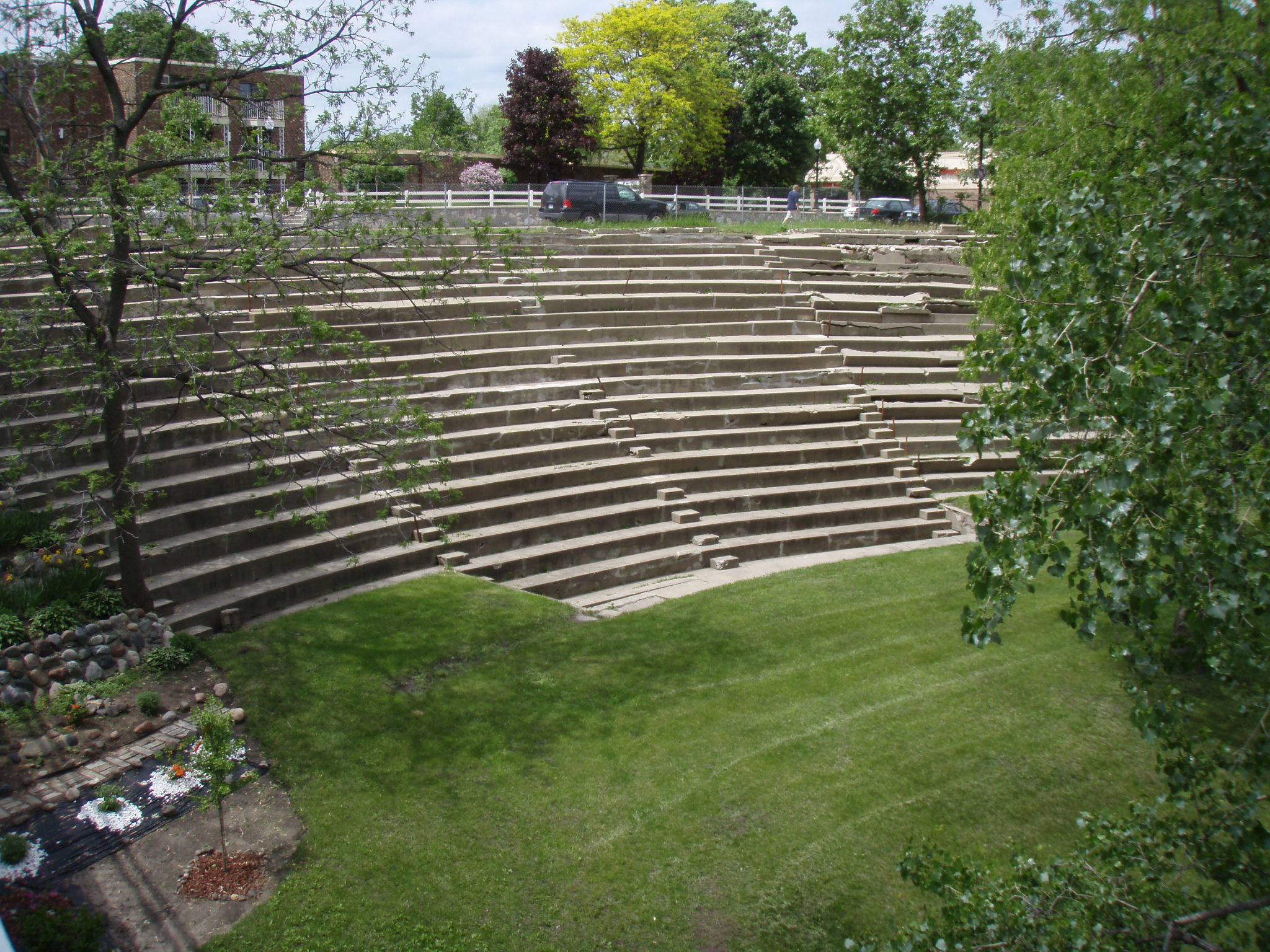

- Location within Minnesota Location within the United States
- Location: Between S. Ferry St. and Rum River, Anoka, Minnesota
- Coordinates: 45°11′50″N 93°23′34″W
- Built: 1914
- Architect: Star Sidewalk Co.; Purcell & Elmslie
- NRHP reference No.: 80001934
- Added to NRHP: January 8, 1980

Windego Park Auditorium/Open Air Theater is an amphitheater in Anoka, Minnesota, located on the Rum River. The theater was built in 1914 and was spurred by the City Beautiful movement, as well as Anoka citizens' interest in outdoor entertainment and recreation. Its main organizer, Thaddeus P. Giddings, was a promoter of music education and had been organizing community singalongs in the summer of 1913. The theater is listed on the National Register of Historic Places.

The amphitheater was designed by William Gray Purcell, from the notable Prairie School firm of Purcell & Elmslie. The seating is on a steep slope, while the stage is on the level portion of the river bank. There is space for 1600 spectators. Purcell was particularly interested in designing the awning system after having taken an interest in the awnings used in the Roman Colosseum.

In 1936, Giddings left for Michigan to organize Interlochen Music College (now known as Interlochen Center for the Arts) in Interlochen, Michigan. Community interest in the amphitheater waned, and the facility started decaying, with shrubs and trees starting to grow between the amphitheater's concrete risers. In 1979, an architecture student from the University of Minnesota drafted a plan to restore the amphitheater, and this restored interest in preserving it. It was listed on the National Register of Historic Places that year, and community organizers did some cleanup work and patched the concrete steps. In 1997, the Windego Park Society was organized.
