= E. S. Hoyt House =

Historic house in Minnesota, United States

- U.S. National Register of Historic Places
- U.S. Historic district – Contributing property
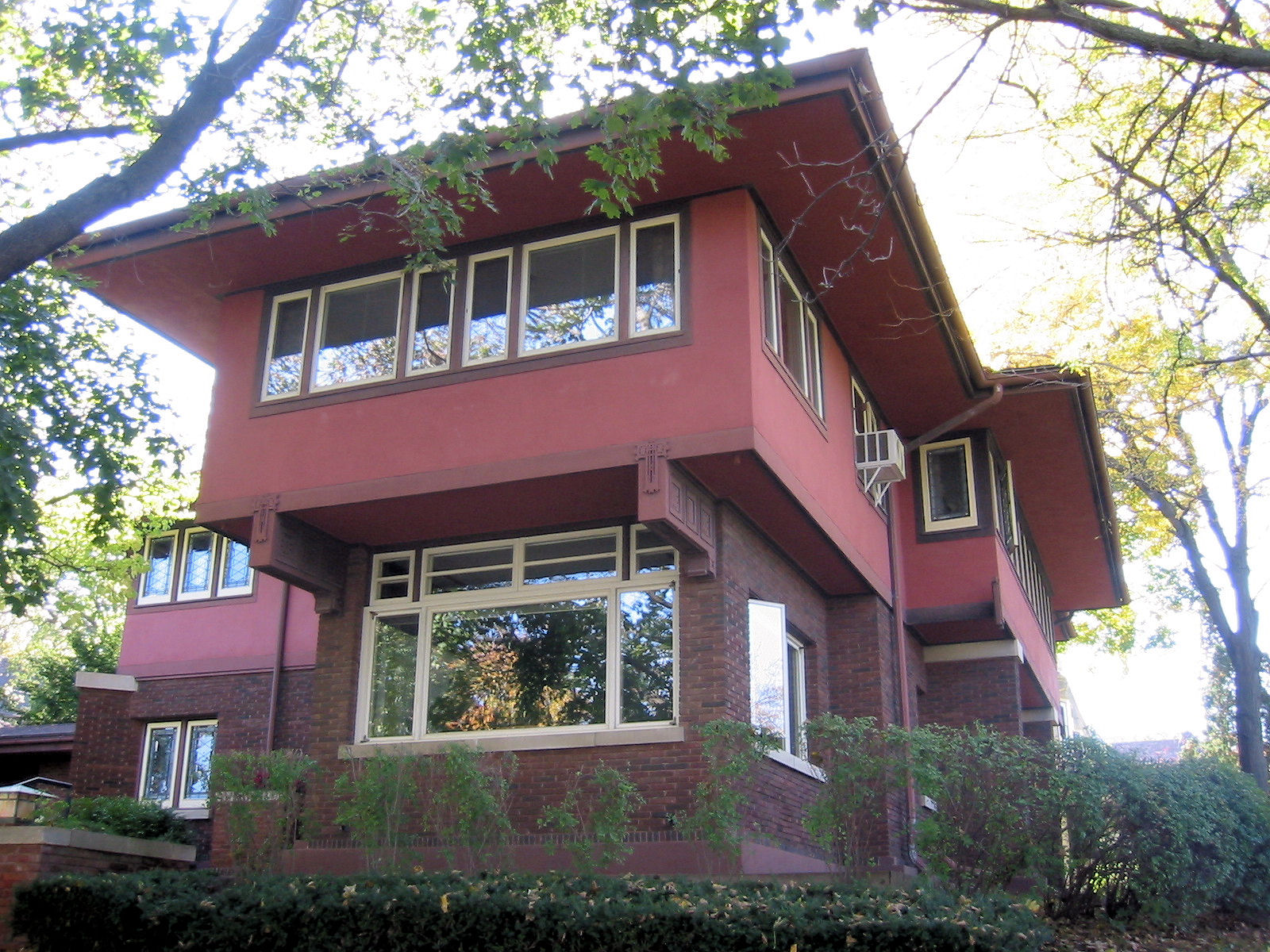

- Location within Minnesota Location within the United States
- Location: 300 Hill Street, Red Wing, Minnesota
- Coordinates: 44°33′42″N 92°32′30″W
- Built: 1913
- Architect: William G. Purcell; George G. Elmslie
- Architectural style: Prairie School
- Part of: Red Wing Residential Historic District (ID82002955)
- NRHP reference No.: 75000981
- Added to NRHP: June 05, 1975

The E.S. Hoyt House is a historic house in Red Wing, Minnesota, United States, designed by the firm of Purcell & Elmslie and built in 1913. The house is listed on the National Register of Historic Places. It is also a contributing property to the Red Wing Residential Historic District.

== Description and history ==
The house is one of their more elaborate designs because its owner had a budget that allowed for lavish decoration. The result is comparable to the William Gray Purcell House and the Edward L. Powers House, both in Minneapolis. The horizontal lines of the Prairie School are more pronounced in this house; they are expressed in the bands of art glass windows on both levels and the cantilevered second story. Its owner, E.S. Hoyt, was the president of the Red Wing Stoneware Company.

The exterior is clad with brick on the first floor and red stucco on the second floor. The house has ten rooms and about 3,600 square feet (330 m^{2}) of floor space. It has 99 diamond-paned art glass windows and a considerable amount of quarter sawn white oak wood ornamentation. The second story of the house is cantilevered over the first story. The entrance opens into a hallway that leads to a library on the left and a living room on the right. The living room, dining room, and an enclosed porch are all stretched across the front of the house and provide plenty of light through the art glass windows. Several of these windows provide panoramic views of the Mississippi River. The kitchen is located behind the dining room, although it has been remodeled since its original design. The second floor of the house has four bedrooms and two bathrooms, several of which have corner windows that expand the sense of space. The maid's room, over the kitchen, had a separate staircase.
