= Merton S. Goodnow House =

Historic house in Minnesota, United States

- U.S. National Register of Historic Places
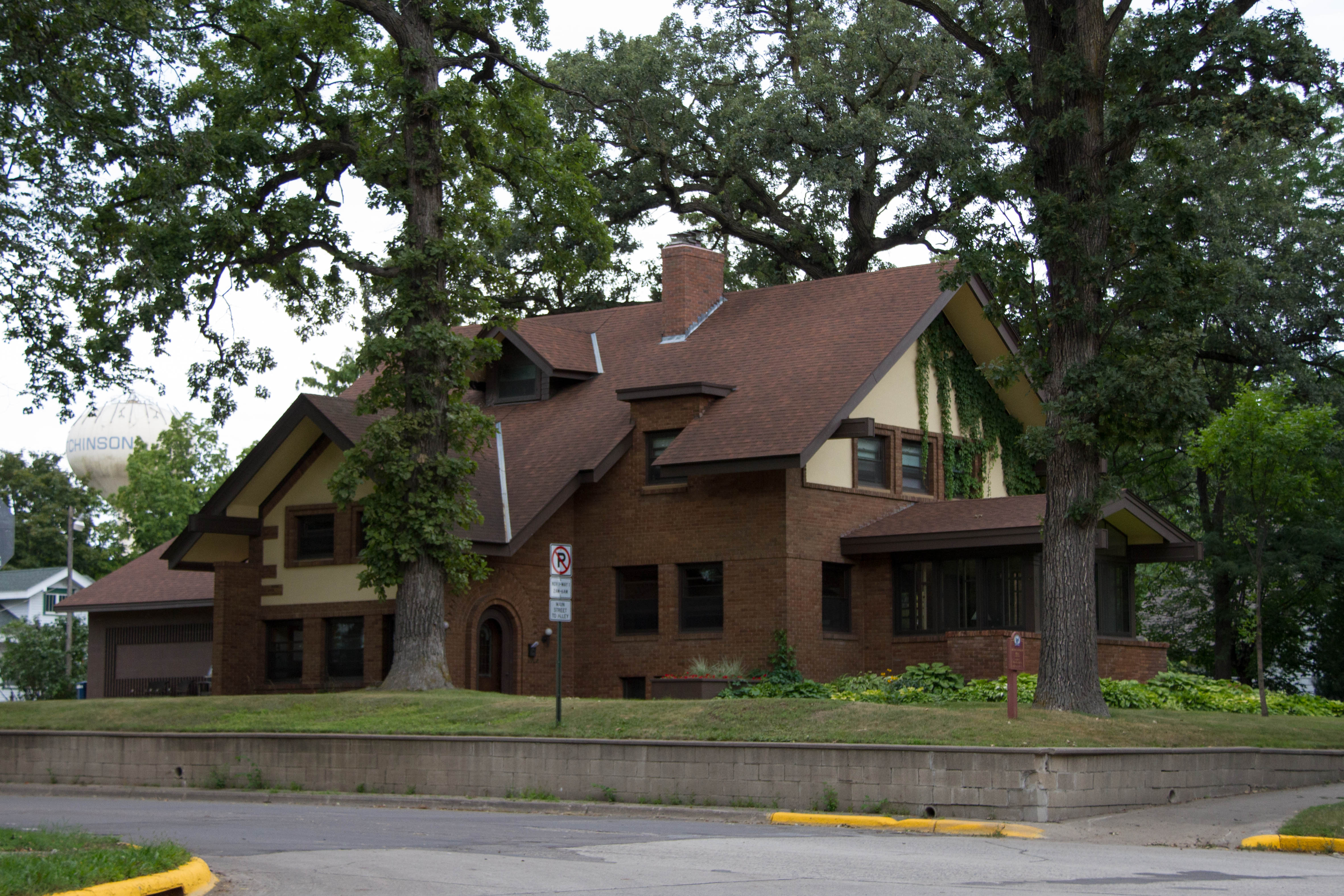

- Location within Minnesota Location within the United States
- Location: 446 S. Main St., Hutchinson, Minnesota
- Coordinates: 44°53′12″N 94°22′10″W
- Area: less than one acre
- Built: 1913
- Architect: Purcell, Feick & Elmslie
- Architectural style: Prairie School
- NRHP reference No.: 85001771
- Added to NRHP: August 15, 1985

The Merton S. Goodnow House at 446 S. Main St. in Hutchinson, Minnesota was built in 1913. It was designed by Purcell, Feick & Elmslie. It was listed on the National Register of Historic Places in 1985.

It was deemed architecturally significant as "a fine example of Prairie School architecture designed by the noted firm of Purcell and Elmslie." The firm focused on designs for relatively inexpensive houses on small lots, such as this. According to the NRHP nomination:

The houses were distinguished by simple massing, compact plans and, if possible, the use of inexpensive materials. Inspiration for these homes came from Frank Lloyd Wright's "Fireproof House for $5,000", published by the Ladies' Home Journal in 1907. The Goodnow House is characteristic of Purcell and Elmslie's residential designs with two stories, a gabled roof, tinted stucco and grouped windows. The massing is unified by string courses, extended beams and boldly overhanging roofs which co-exist with the interplay of horizontals and verticals. Typical of Purcell and Elmslie was the use of both brick and stucco on the exterior. The living room and dining room are opened as a single space which pivots around the fireplace. This was a highly sophisticated spatial arrangement maximizing the sense of space in a restricted area. This arrangement was continually refined by Purcell and Elmslie in their residential work.
