= Community House, First Congregational Church =

Historic church in Wisconsin, United States

- U.S. National Register of Historic Places
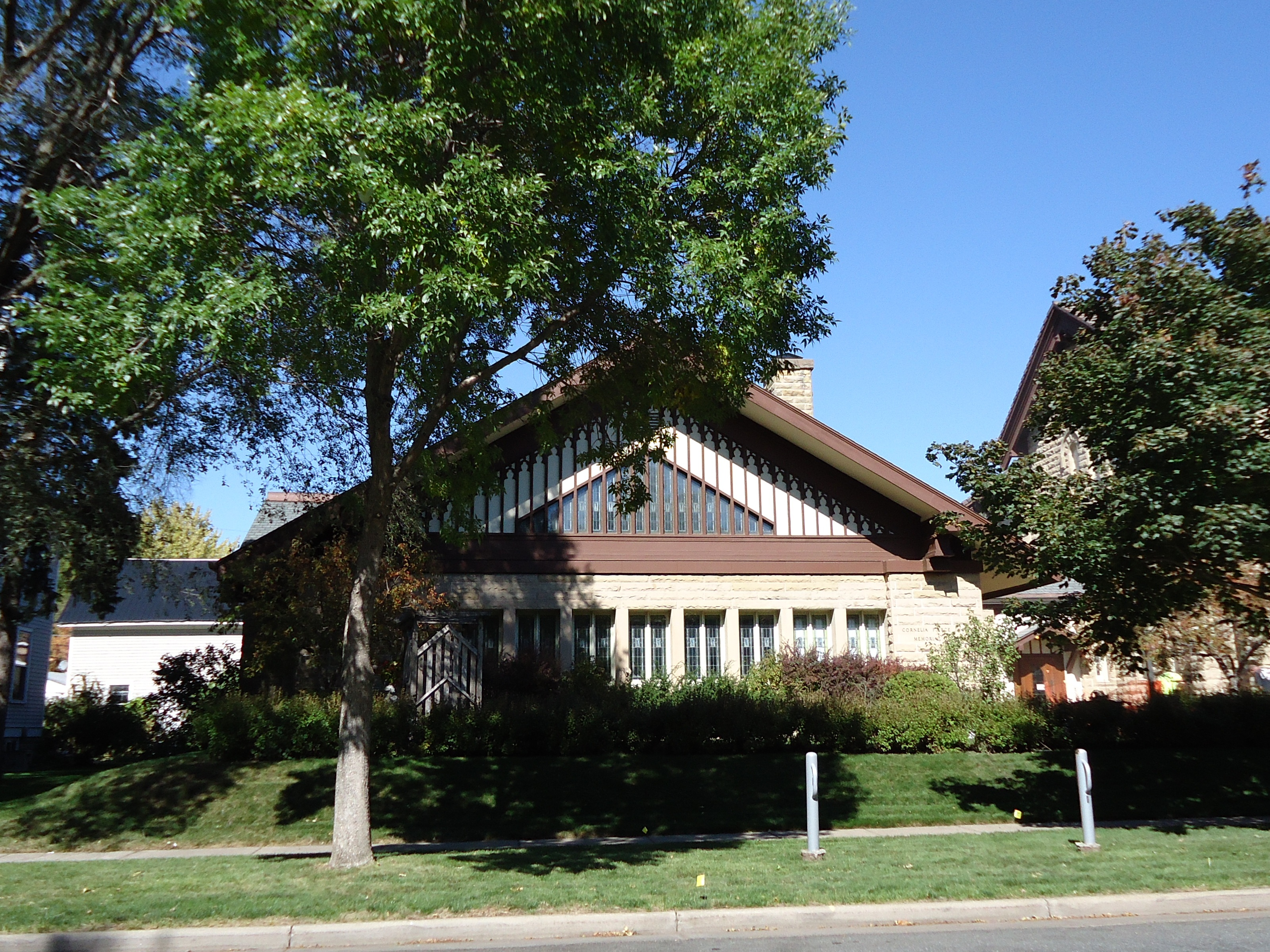

- Location within Wisconsin Location within the United States
- Location: 310 Broadway, Eau Claire, Wisconsin
- Coordinates: 44°48′19″N 91°30′22″W
- Area: less than one acre
- Built: 1914
- Architect: Purcell & Elmslie
- Architectural style: Prairie School
- NRHP reference No.: 74000085
- Added to NRHP: July 18, 1974

Community House, First Congregational Church is located in Eau Claire, Wisconsin. It was built in the Prairie School architectural style in 1914. On July 18, 1974, it was added to the National Register of Historic Places for its architectural significance.
