= Exchange State Bank =

- U.S. National Register of Historic Places
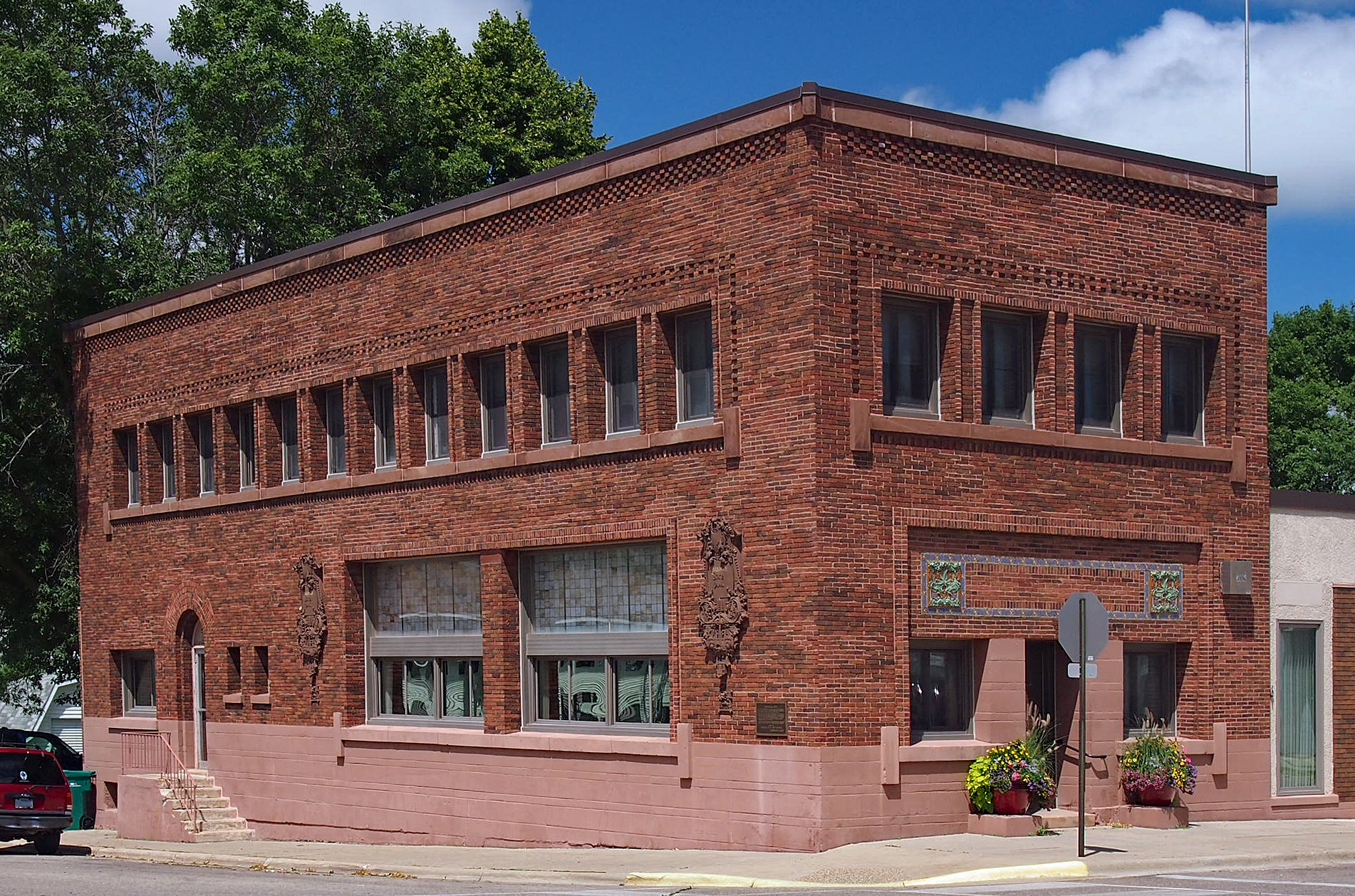
- Exchange State Bank from the southeast

- Location within Minnesota Location within the United States
- Location: 105 Main Street N., Grand Meadow, Minnesota
- Coordinates: 43°42′22″N 92°34′16″W
- Area: less than one acre
- Built: 1910
- Architect: Purcell & Elmslie
- Architectural style: Prairie School
- NRHP reference No.: 75000997
- Added to NRHP: June 10, 1975

The Exchange State Bank in Grand Meadow, Minnesota, United States, is a Prairie School style building that was built in 1910. It was designed by architects Purcell & Elmslie. It has also been known as the First American State Bank. It was listed on the National Register of Historic Places in 1975.

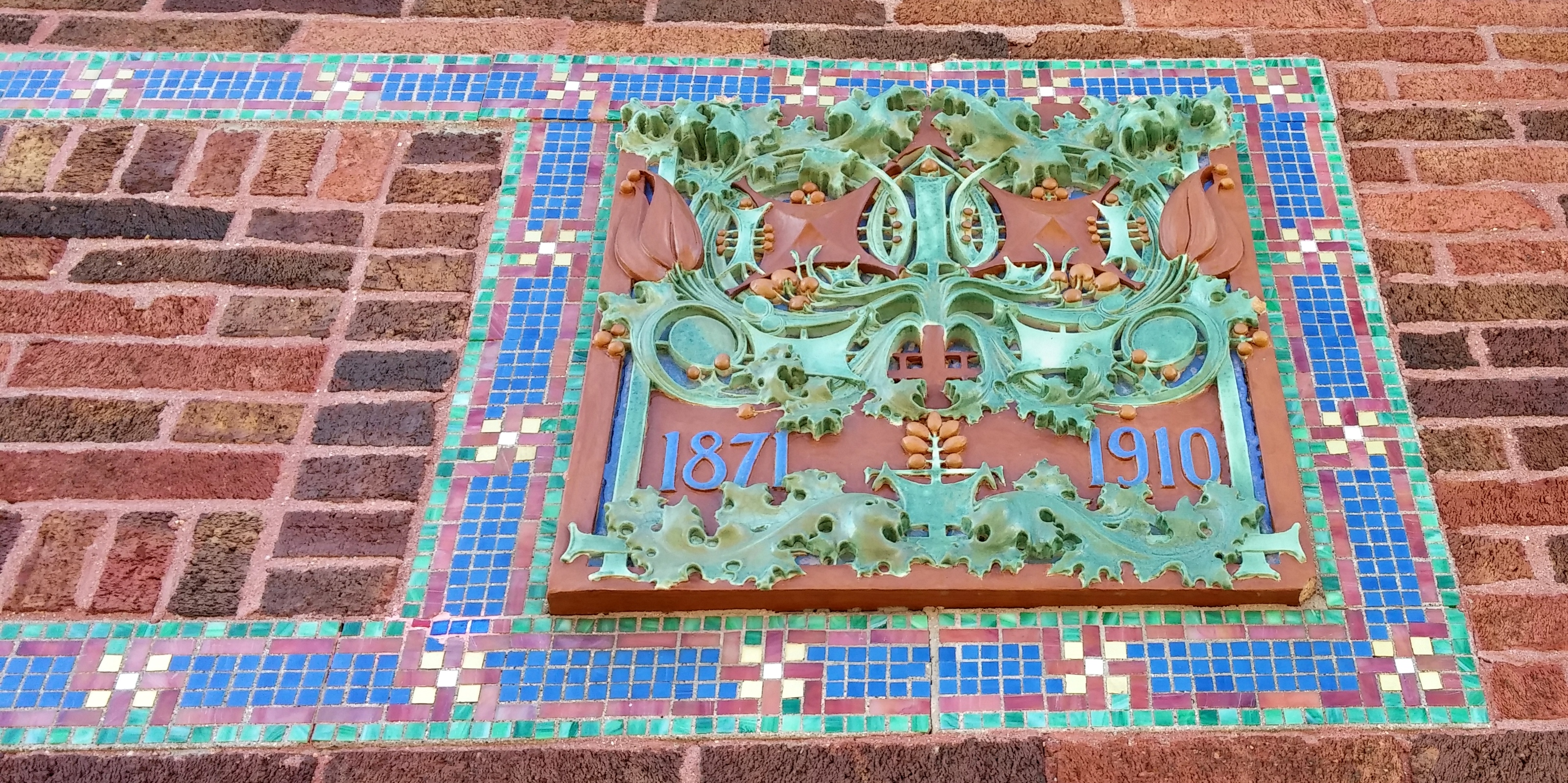
Terracotta, tile, and brickwork detail on the exterior front of the building

It is significant as the first major joint project of Purcell and Elmslie, and one of few commercial buildings by them. William Gray Purcell designed the building and George Grant Elmslie created the ornamentation of terra cotta, glass mosaic and wood. The building has been regarded as an "excellent" example of Prairie School architecture, implemented in brick.

== See also ==
- First State Bank of Le Roy, the third bank designed by Purcell and Elmslie
