= First National Bank (Rhinelander, Wisconsin) =

- U.S. National Register of Historic Places
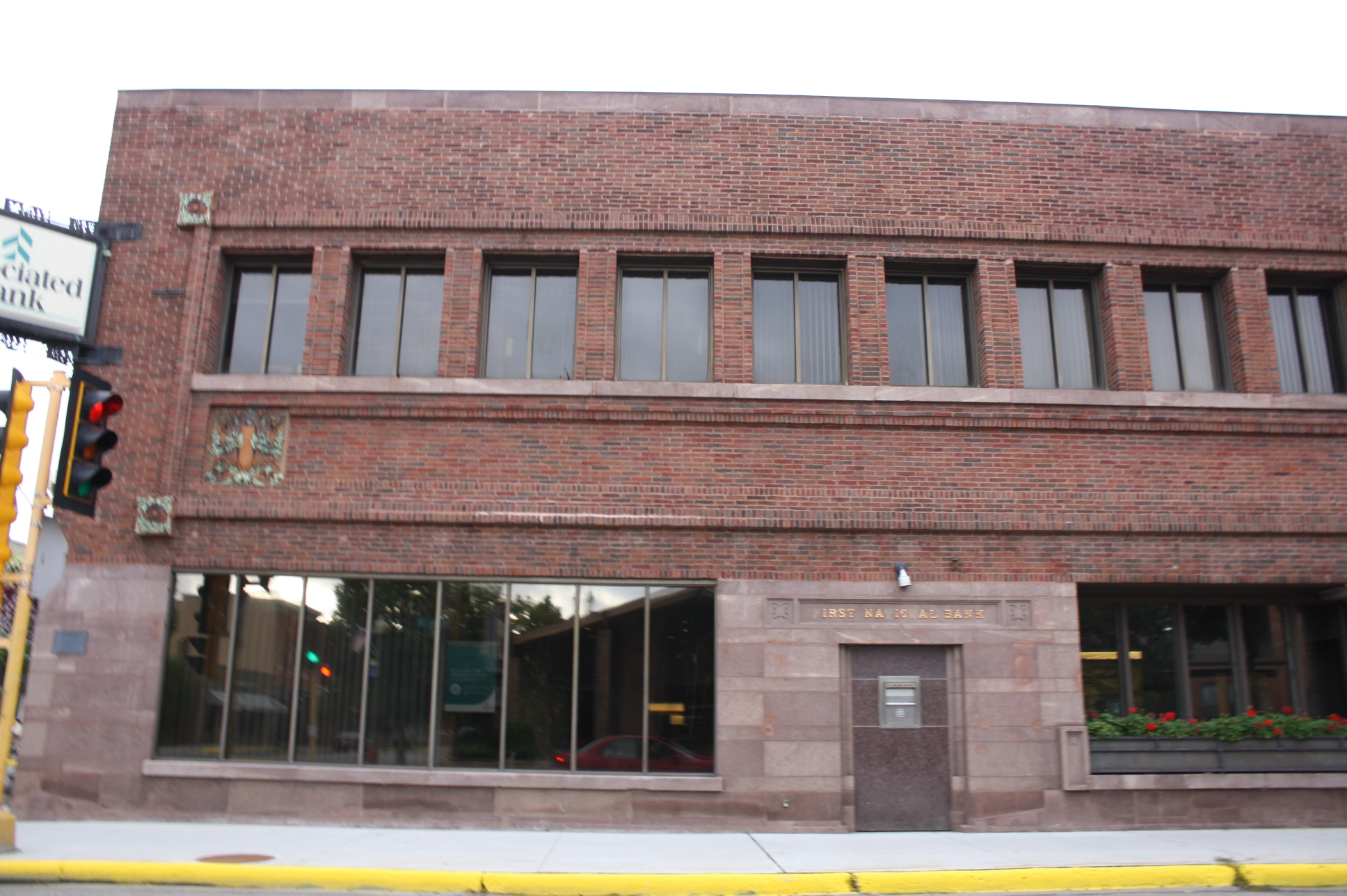
- First National Bank, September 2011

- Location within Wisconsin Location within the United States
- Location: 8 W. Davenport St., Rhinelander, Wisconsin
- Coordinates: 45°38′17″N 89°24′41″W
- Area: less than one acre
- Built: 1911
- Architect: Purcell & Elmslie
- Architectural style: Late 19th and Early 20th Century American Movements, Sullivanesque
- NRHP reference No.: 73000091
- Added to NRHP: August 14, 1973

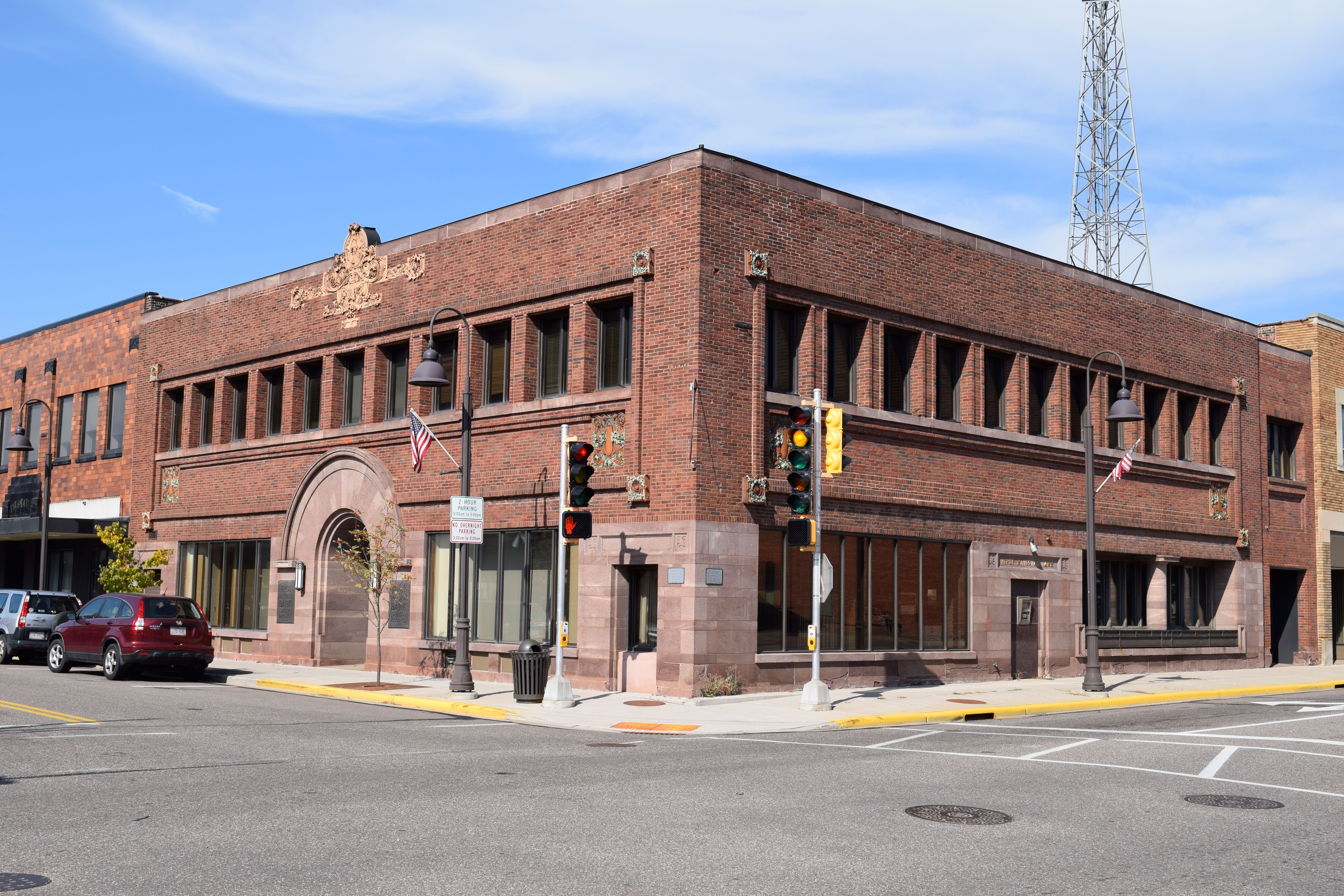
First National Bank in Rhinelander, Wisconsin

The First National Bank in Rhinelander, Wisconsin was built in 1911. It is a Sullivanesque building designed by architects Purcell & Elmslie. It was listed on the National Register of Historic Places in 1973.
