= Stewart Memorial Presbyterian Church =

Historic church in Minnesota, United States

- U.S. National Register of Historic Places
- Minneapolis Landmark
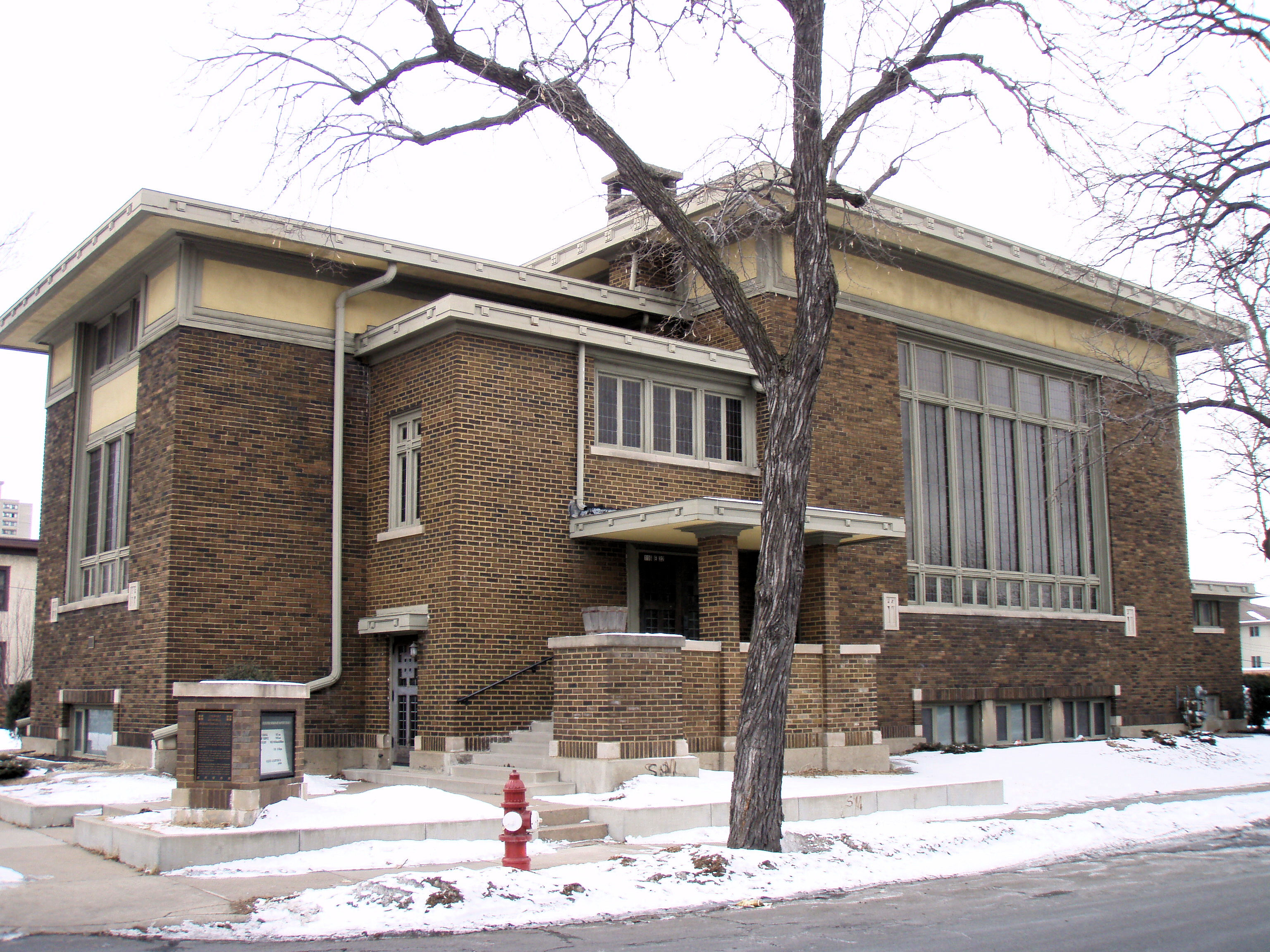
- Stewart Memorial Presbyterian Church from the southwest

- Location within Minnesota Location within the United States
- Location: 116 East 32nd Street, Minneapolis, Minnesota
- Coordinates: 44°56′43″N 93°16′32″W
- Built: 1910
- Architect: Purcell & Feick
- Architectural style: Prairie School
- NRHP reference No.: 78001543

Significant dates
- Added to NRHP: November 28, 1978
- Designated MPLSL: 1984

Stewart Memorial Presbyterian Church, now Alhikma Islamic Center, is a Prairie School church in the Lyndale neighborhood of Minneapolis, Minnesota, United States. Prairie School architecture was uncommon for use in churches. This church, which has a flat roof and broad eaves but lacks a bell tower and other traditional church features, was inspired by Frank Lloyd Wright's Unity Temple in Oak Park, Illinois. It was designed by the firm of Purcell & Feick before George Grant Elmslie became a partner of the firm. The congregation was an offshoot of First Presbyterian Church and was named after the Reverend David Stewart.

The main portion of the church is organized around a cube-shaped auditorium with light provided by a wall of eastward-facing green-tinted windows. It has a narrower section with a deep balcony that extends to the south. Decoration is relatively modest, consisting mainly of wood strips in geometric patterns. The exterior is faced in brick and stucco. The church was listed on the National Register of Historic Places in 1978. In 1988, Redeemer Missionary Baptist Church bought the building and raised over $2 million for restoration and renovation. The structure became the Alhikma Islamic Center by 2024.
