= Mrs. Richard Polson House =

Historic house in Wisconsin, United States

- U.S. National Register of Historic Places
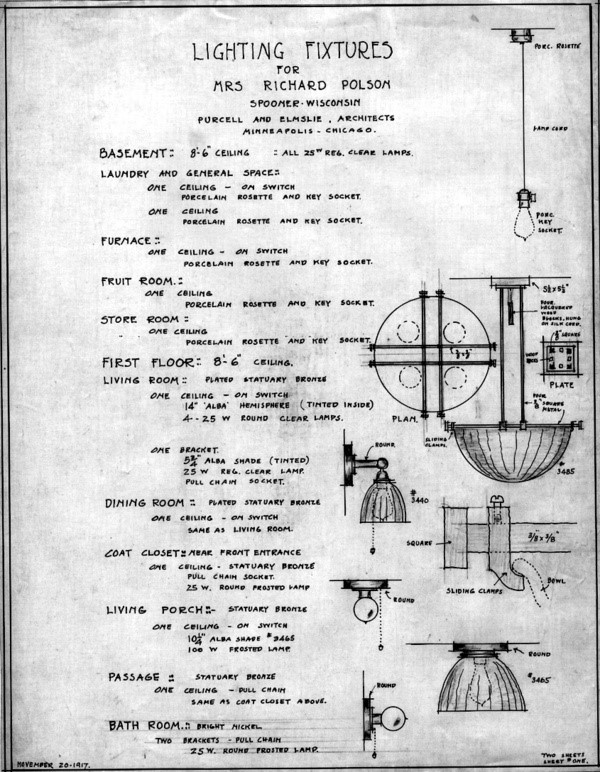
- Lighting fixtures drawings and specifications by Purcell & Elmslie

- Location within Wisconsin Location within the United States
- Nearest city: Spooner, Wisconsin
- Coordinates: 45°50′20″N 91°52′30″W
- Area: less than one acre
- Built: 1917
- Architect: Purcell & Elmslie
- Architectural style: Beaux Arts
- NRHP reference No.: 84003798
- Added to NRHP: February 8, 1984

The Mrs. Richard Polson House located on Route 2 near Spooner, Wisconsin, United States, was built in 1917. It was designed by Prairie School architects Purcell & Elmslie in Beaux Arts style. It was built as a wedding gift from Mrs. Richard Polson for her son D. B. Brockett. It was listed on the National Register of Historic Places in 1984.
