= Dr. Oscar Owre House =

Historic house in Minnesota, United States

- U.S. National Register of Historic Places
- Minneapolis Landmark
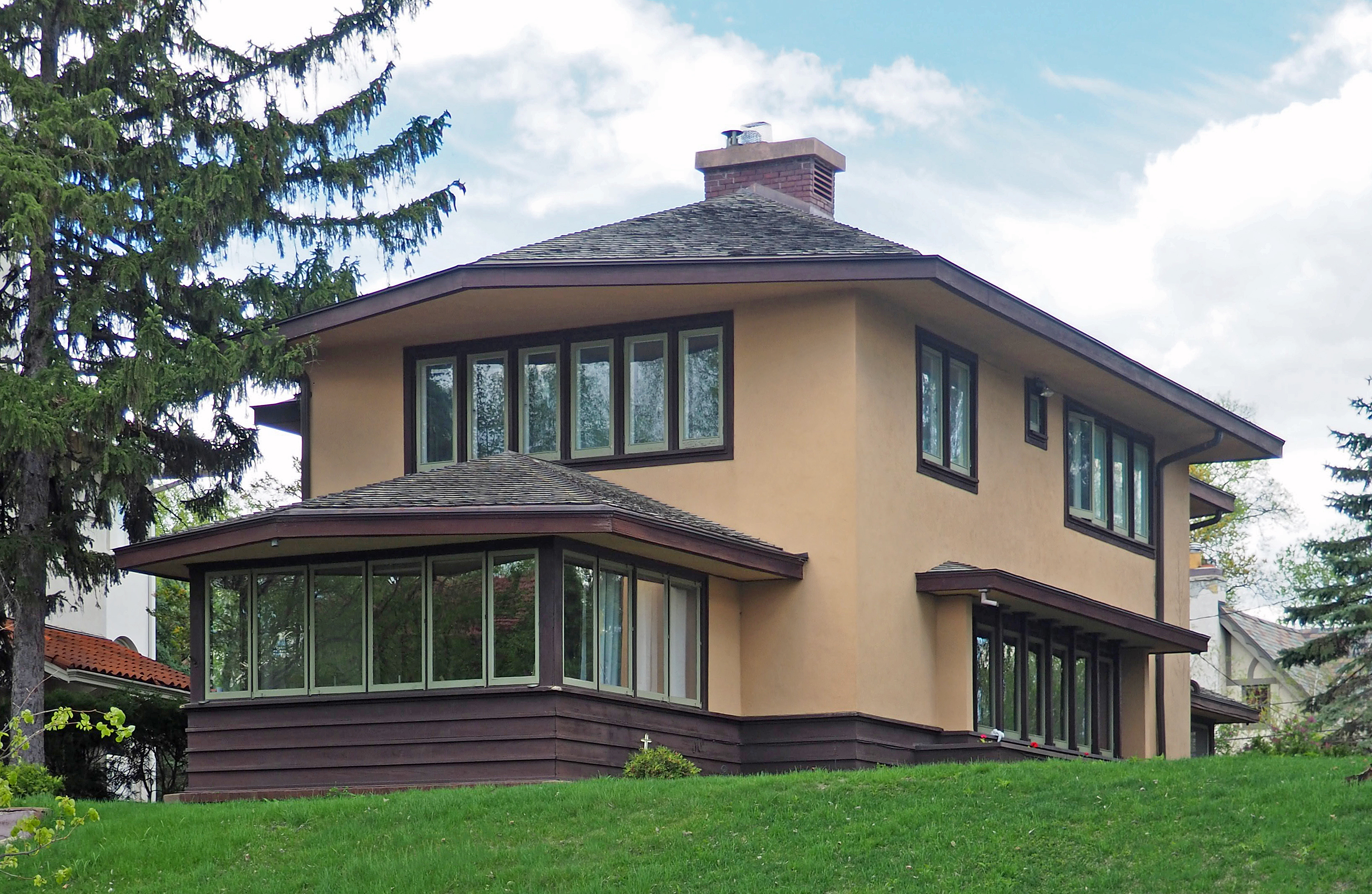
- The Dr. Oscar Owre House viewed from the west

- Location within Minnesota Location within the United States
- Location: 2625 Newton Avenue South, Minneapolis, Minnesota
- Coordinates: 44°57′28″N 93°18′20″W
- Built: 1912
- Architect: Purcell, Feick & Elmslie
- Architectural style: Prairie School
- NRHP reference No.: 84001446

Significant dates
- Added to NRHP: March 8, 1984
- Designated MPLSL: 1983

The Dr. Oscar Owre House is a historic house located at 2625 Newton Venue South just north of Lake of the Isles in Minneapolis, Minnesota. It was designed by notable local architects Purcell, Feick & Elmslie in the Prairie School style.

== Description and history ==
Dr. Oscar Owre was a professor at the University of Minnesota School of Dentistry. The house is generally cube-shaped but extends outward through a series of porches. The front porch is glassed-in and provides a good view of the lake. It shares some design features with the nearby William Gray Purcell House, including the low, overhanging eaves, bands of windows, and the side entry.

Dr. Owre and his wife, Katherine, were concerned that the house would come in over its budget. William Purcell later wrote, "Oscar was scared to death that this building was going to cost him more than he could afford, and had been told by all his friends that every building operation carried on by an architect was loaded with heartbreaking extras which would spoil all his fun, if not ruin him financially." Fortunately for the Owres, the house actually came in under budget, at $17,275. The house was listed on the National Register of Historic Places on March 8, 1984.
