= First National Bank of Adams =

- U.S. National Register of Historic Places
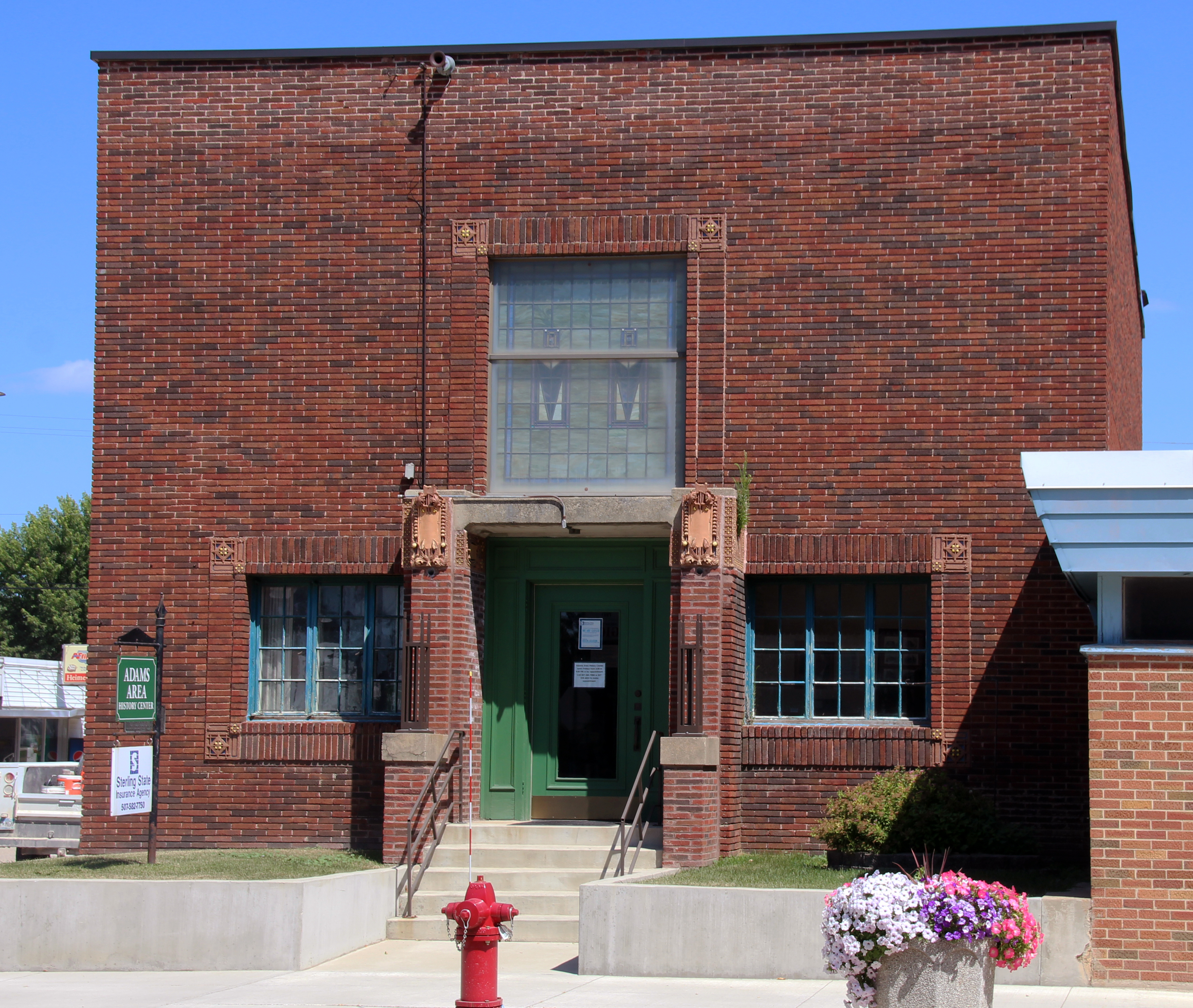
- First National Bank of Adams from the southwest

- Location within Minnesota Location within the United States
- Location: 322 Main Street, Adams, Minnesota
- Coordinates: 43°34′3″N 92°43′7″W
- Area: less than one acre
- Built: 1924
- Architect: Purcell & Elmslie
- NRHP reference No.: 86000442
- Added to NRHP: March 20, 1986

The First National Bank of Adams is a historic commercial building on Main Street in Adams, Minnesota, United States. Built in 1924, it was designed by the noted Prairie School architects Purcell & Elmslie. The interior of the building includes a mural by John W. Norton. The building also housed the village council chambers and was later operated as a municipal liquor store and known as the Adams Municipal Liquor Store. It was listed on the National Register of Historic Places in 1986.

== Adams Area History Center ==
In 2018, the Adams Area Historical Society established the Adams Area History Center in the First National Bank Building to commemorate Adams' sesquicentennial. The History Center is home to a variety of collections and research materials.
