= First State Bank of Le Roy =

- U.S. National Register of Historic Places
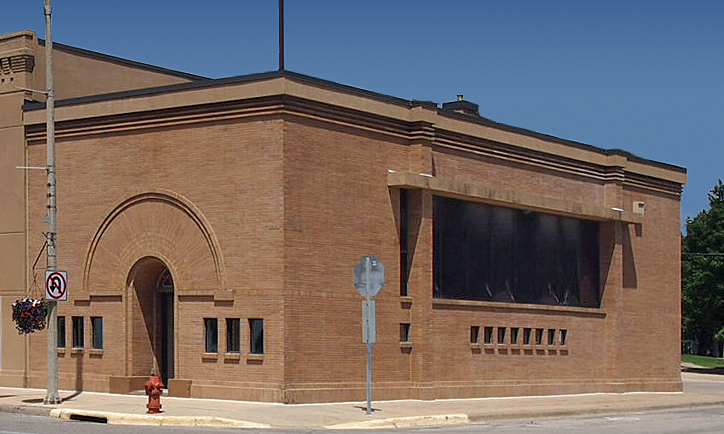
- First State Bank of Le Roy from the south

- Location within Minnesota Location within the United States
- Location: Main St. and Broadway, Le Roy, Minnesota
- Coordinates: 43°30′36″N 92°30′13″W
- Area: less than one acre
- Built: 1914
- Architect: Purcell & Elmslie
- Architectural style: Prairie School
- NRHP reference No.: 86000445
- Added to NRHP: March 20, 1986

The First State Bank of Le Roy at Main St. and Broadway in Le Roy, Minnesota, United States, is a small bank that was built in 1914. It was designed by architects Purcell & Elmslie in Prairie School architecture style. It was listed on the National Register of Historic Places (NRHP) in 1986.

Its NRHP nomination describes it as "a small gem". It was the third small bank designed by Purcell and Elmslie, and was designed to cost just under $10,000 to meet objections of a dissenting bank director.

== See also ==
- Exchange State Bank, the first small bank designed by Purcell and Elmslie, located in Grand Meadow, Minnesota, also NRHP-listed.
