= Kasson Municipal Building =

- U.S. National Register of Historic Places
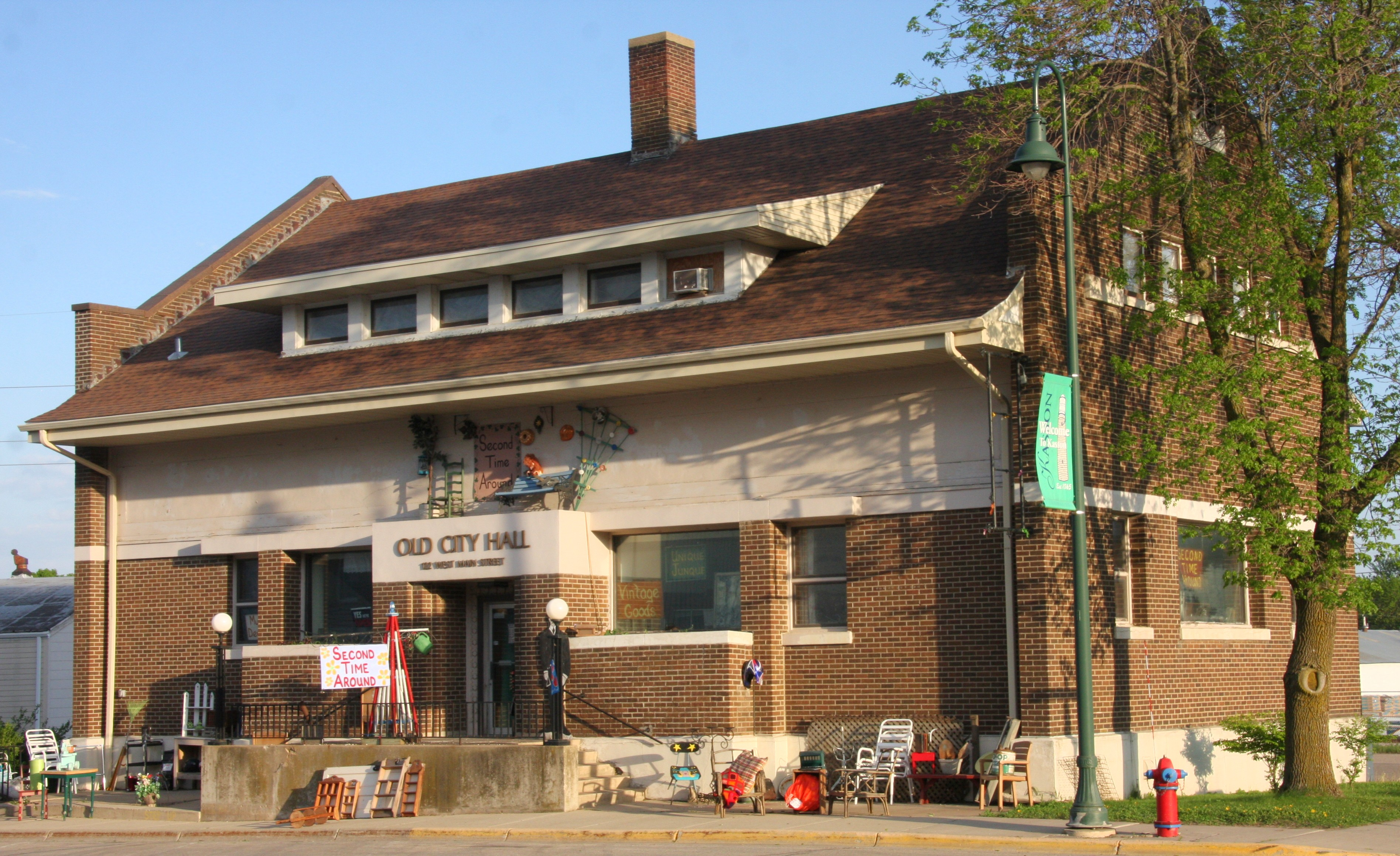
- The building in 2017

- Location within Minnesota Location within the United States
- Location: 122 West Main, Kasson, Minnesota
- Coordinates: 44°1′45″N 92°45′1″W
- Area: less than one acre
- Built: 1917
- Architect: Purcell & Elmslie
- Architectural style: Prairie School
- MPS: Dodge County MRA
- NRHP reference No.: 82002942
- Added to NRHP: April 16, 1982

The Kasson Municipal Building, also known as Old City Hall, is a historic building located on Main Street in Kasson, Minnesota, United States. Built in 1917, it was designed by Purcell & Elmslie in the Prairie School style. It was listed on the National Register of Historic Places in 1982. In 2005, a printing and copying business began operating in the building.
