= Merchants National Bank (Winona, Minnesota) =

Historic bank in Minnesota, US

- U.S. National Register of Historic Places
- U.S. Historic district – Contributing property
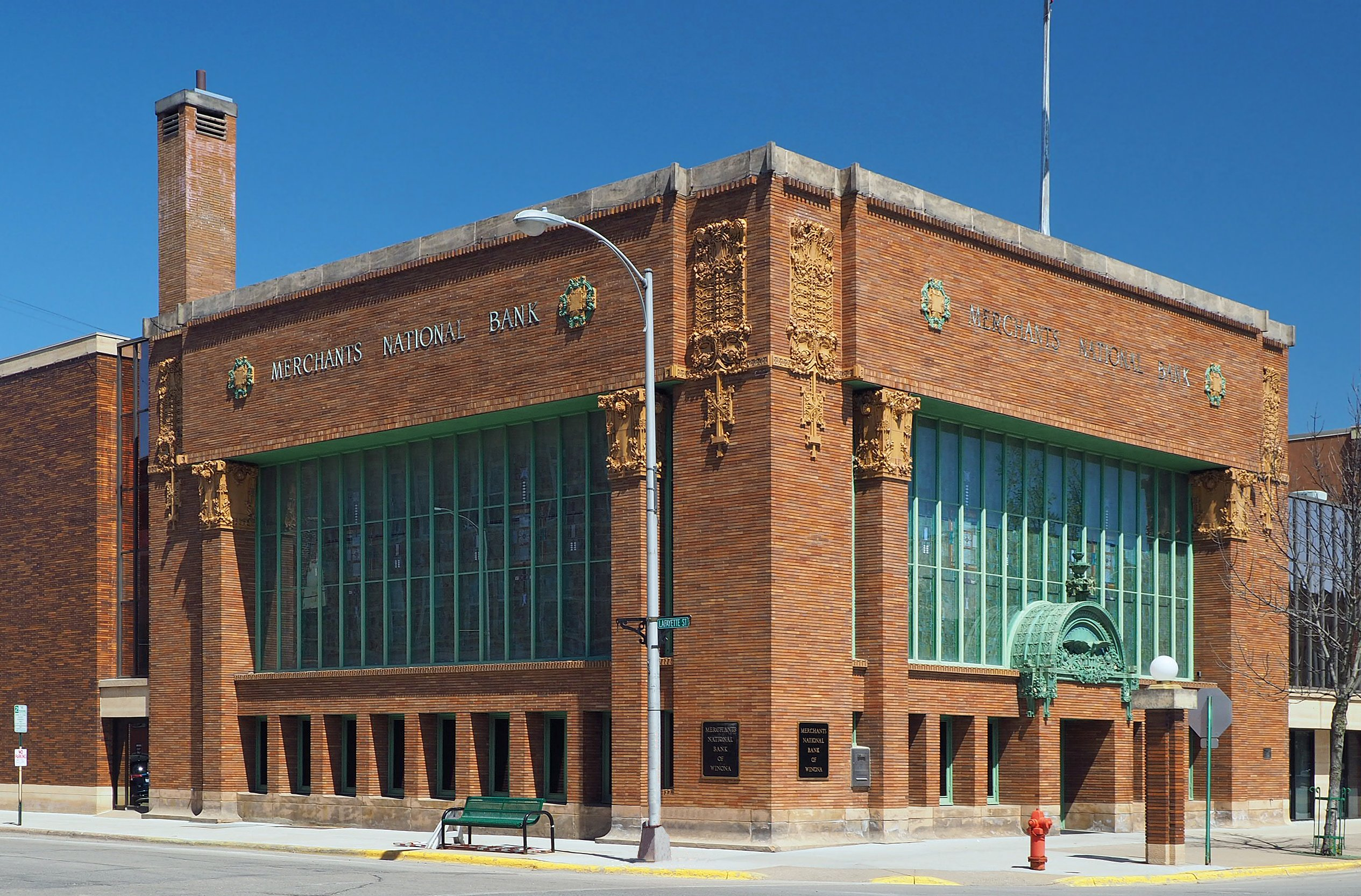
- Merchants National Bank from the southwest

- Location within Minnesota Location within the United States
- Location: 102 East 3rd Street, Winona, Minnesota
- Coordinates: 44°3′7.5″N 91°38′5.5″W
- Area: Less than one acre
- Built: 1912
- Architect: William Gray Purcell, George Feick, Jr., and George Grant Elmslie
- Architectural style: Prairie School
- Part of: Winona Commercial Historic District (ID98001220)
- NRHP reference No.: 74001045

Significant dates
- Added to NRHP: October 16, 1974
- Designated CP: October 1, 1998

Merchants National Bank is a bank building in Winona, Minnesota, United States, designed in the Prairie School architectural style. It was built in 1912 and features elaborate terracotta and stained-glass ornamentation. It was listed on the National Register of Historic Places in 1974 for its state-level significance in the themes of architecture and commerce. It was nominated for being the "largest and probably best example" of the 18 Midwestern banks designed by Purcell, Feick & Elmslie, a significant influence on early-20th-century American architecture. It is also a contributing property to the Winona Commercial Historic District.

== Description ==
Architects William Gray Purcell, George Feick, Jr., and George Grant Elmslie intended the building to appear solid and stable, to impress both bankers and customers. The design elements reflected the agricultural importance of the community, with terracotta sculptures of grain on the exterior and murals of farm scenes—painted by their friend Albert Fleury—inside. A terracotta eagle perches above the entrance. The interior receives sunlight through stained glass window walls and a skylight, and is also lit with vertical light standards topped by round globes. Purcell used some of these design features in the Edna S. Purcell House, built a year later.

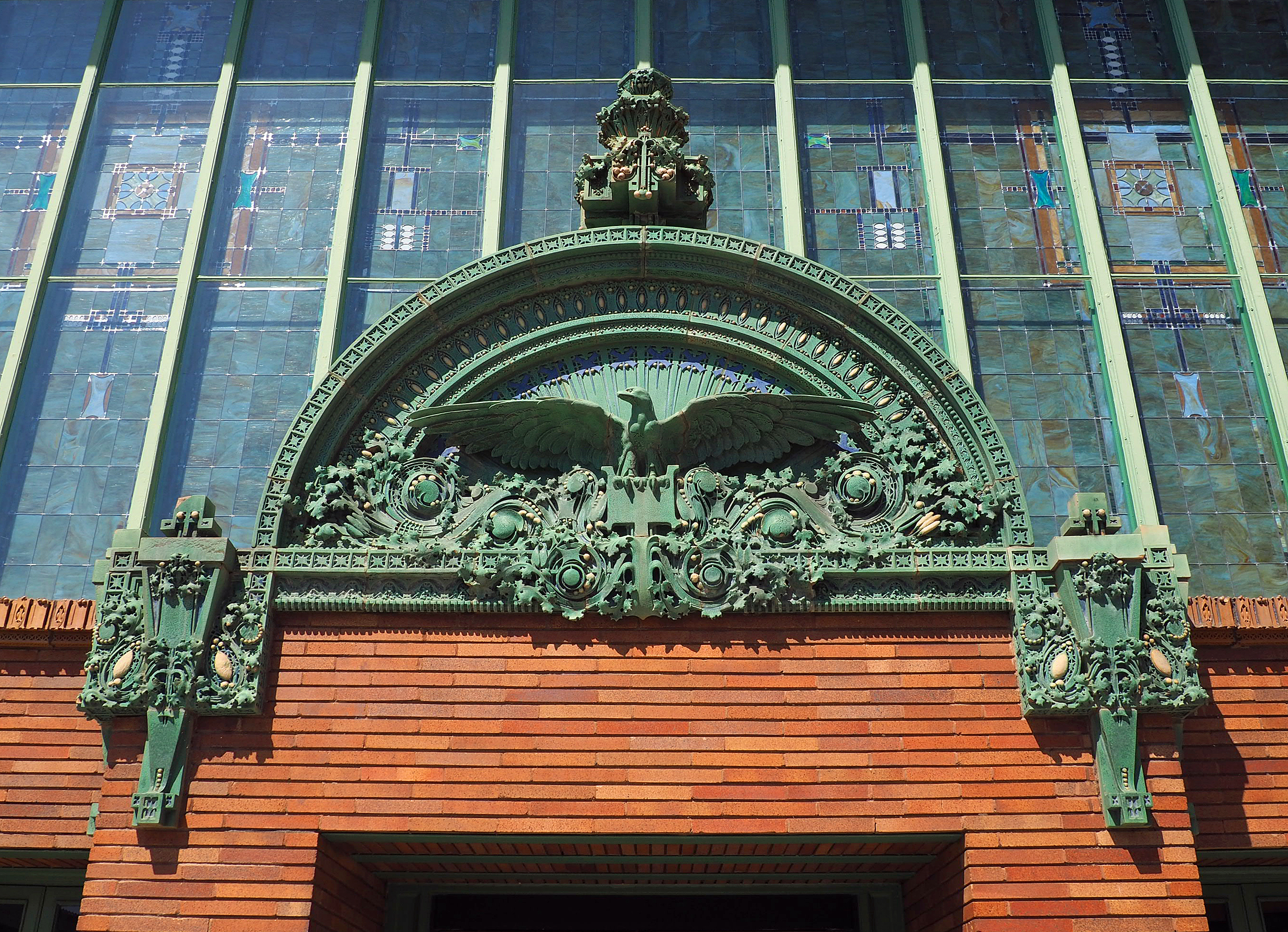
Entryway

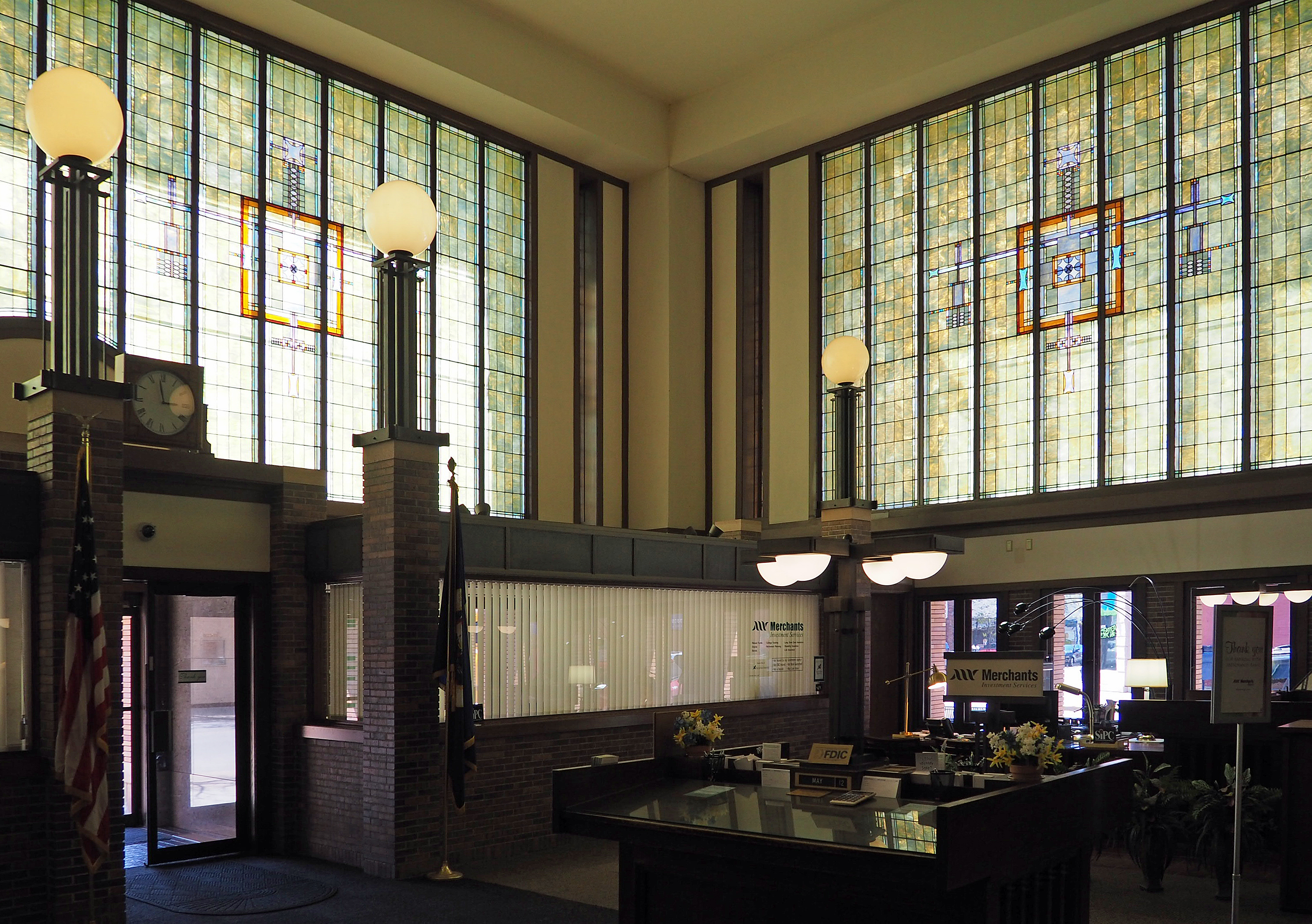
Interior

== Significance ==
Until the early 20th century America's civic institutions looked to European antecedents for architectural models. As a result, neoclassical columns and pediments not only predominated but also served as billboards proclaiming the security and gravitas of these establishments. The Merchants National Bank departed from this tradition by taking its inspiration from native sources—the uniquely American architecture of Louis Sullivan and the Prairie School tenets of Frank Lloyd Wright. Sullivan's 1908 National Farmers' Bank of Owatonna first demonstrated how successful the marriage of American style and banking needs could be.

The Winona bank was unusual for its time and place. In the river town where Victorian commercial blocks prevailed, the bank's cube-like geometry was different. Botanically inspired terracotta ornamentation was widespread across its façades. Stained glass, generally reserved for religious structures, was used in expansive windows and a sky lit ceiling. Yet the building was also rooted in the Minnesota landscape. Brick and terracotta referenced the town's history of brick manufacturing. Large wall murals, depicting river scenes and the Wisconsin bluffs were around the bank. In its singularity and sense of place, the structure evoked a sense of pride among Winonans and Minnesotans alike.

== See also ==
- National Register of Historic Places listings in Winona County, Minnesota
