= Jump River (town), Wisconsin =

Jump River, Wisconsin
- Town
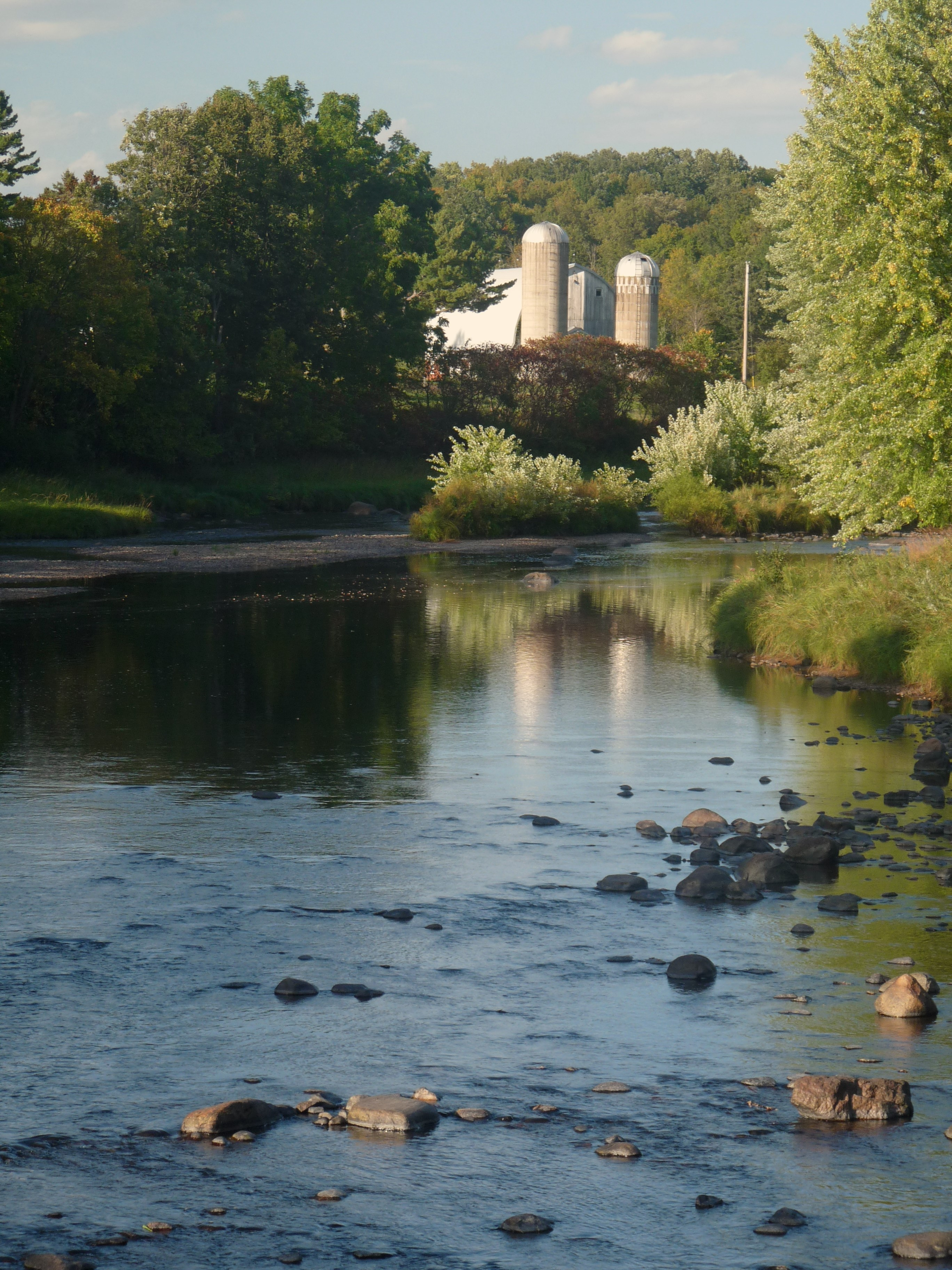
- Looking upstream from the Highway 73 bridge

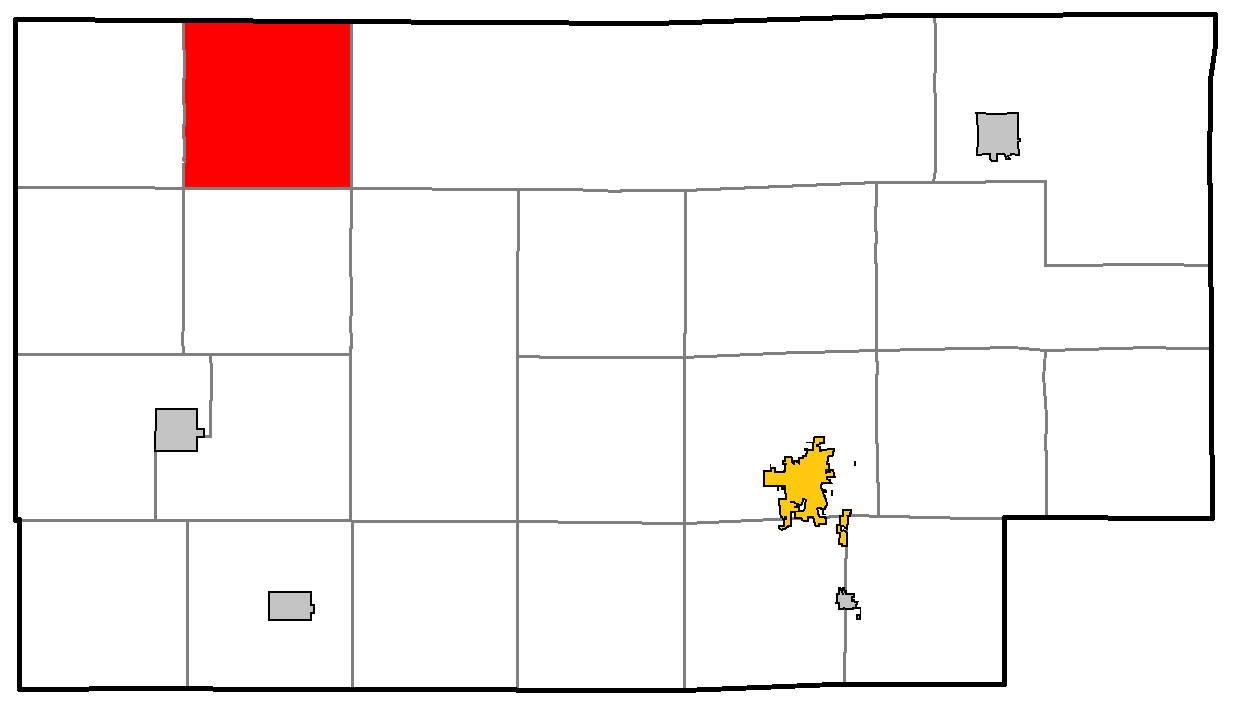
- Location of Jump River, within Taylor County

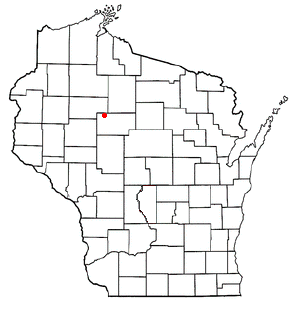
- Location of Jump River, Wisconsin
- Coordinates: 45°19′34″N 90°45′24″W
- Country: United States
- State: Wisconsin
- County: Taylor

Area
  - Total: 36.0 sq mi (93.2 km^{2})
  - Land: 36.0 sq mi (93.2 km^{2})
  - Water: 0 sq mi (0.0 km^{2})
- Elevation: 1,270 ft (387 m)

Population (2020)
  - Total: 275
  - Density: 7.64/sq mi (2.95/km^{2})
- Time zone: UTC-6 (Central (CST))
  - Summer (DST): UTC-5 (CDT)
- Area codes: 715 & 534
- FIPS code: 55-38627
- GNIS feature ID: 1583460
- PLSS township: T33N R3W
- Website: https://www.jumpriverwisconsin.com/

Jump River is a town in Taylor County, Wisconsin, United States. The population was 275 at the 2020 census. The town takes its name from the Jump River which flows through its northwestern corner. There is also a census-designated place called Jump River located partially in the town.

== History ==
In 1847, surveyors working for the U.S. government walked the six mile (10 km) square that would become the town of Jump River. They marked off the outline of the township on foot using compass and chain. A crew came back in 1855 to survey all the section lines. When done, the deputy surveyor filed this general description:

This Township contains several swamps and some of considerable extent. They are all unfit for cultivation. The Meadow and Alder bottom are all liable to be overflowed to a depth of 1-foot (0.30 m) or more. and are good for Hay. The surface is generally level apart is upland where the soil is 2d rate. This Township is heavily timbered and is cheifly [sic] composed of Hemlock and Y. Birch on low level land, but on upland it is Sugar Linden W. Pine Balsam and Elm. The undergrowth is Generally thick and is composed of Hemlock, Hazel, and Balsam. Elm and Balsam line the Margin of the Meadow and Alder Bottoms and also most of the Streams.

In 1863 the federal government granted the first land patents in what would become the town of Jump River, granting ownership of three parcels:

- 120 acres along Levitt Creek in sections 8 and 17 to Barton W. Chase. Chase had apparently bought the land from Daniel Stevens of the Massachusetts Militia, who had been granted rights to the land as payment for serving in the War of 1812.
- Another 120 acres along Levitt Creek in section 8 to Charles B. Coleman. Coleman had apparently bought rights to the land from George W. Jones of the Wisconsin Militia, who had the rights for serving in the Black Hawk War.
- 160 acres near the Jump River in sections 4 and 5 (the Jahnke, Johnson and Smith neighborhoods) to Joseph W. Wiggins. Wiggins had bought rights to the land from the heirs of John R. Patten, who had served in the Illinois Militia in the Black Hawk War.

The largest grantee was Ezra Cornell, who received many quarter-sections in 1868 and 1869 to help finance the new Cornell University under the Morrill Land-Grant Colleges Act.

The plat map ca. 1880 of the 6-mile square that would become Jump River showed no roads or settlers yet, while the same set of maps already showed significant settlement along the Wisconsin Central Railroad - especially around Medford: homesteads, rural schools, sawmills and wagon roads. Also out west of future Gilman, a few had settled along the Yellow River. In the unsettled future Jump River, the largest land-holders in 1880 were Cornell University, W. Ramsay, M.W. Simmonds, and the Wisconsin Central Railroad. To finance building the railway up through Medford, the government gave the Wisconsin Central the odd-numbered sections for eighteen miles on either side of the rails, and Jump River was just at the edge of that land grant.

Barney and Gertrude Broeder were the first settlers in the town, arriving in 1892. Others soon followed. The Stanley, Merrill and Phillips Railway reached the town in 1904. Prior to that, logging operations generally stuck to white pine reasonably close to the river, since the only way to get logs out was floating them downstream. The last logs were driven down Jump River around 1903. With the arrival of the railroad, logging operations could shift to stands away from the river and eventually to hardwoods. The Northwestern company laid rail spurs and temporary logging spurs over much of the township.

The 1911 plat map of the area that would become Jump River Township shows most of the land still owned by logging companies, but a few settlers' homes. A road of some sort follows the current route of modern Highway 73 and then continues straight north across the river. Next to that road south of the river is the Allamang School. A dozen homes are sprinkled east of Jump River around Barney Broeder's. A few other homes are on the west end where modern County H crosses the river, but the rest is lumber company land, with the Northwestern Lumber Co. holding the lion's share.

In 1923, the Town of Jump River was established with its current boundaries. The stone Jump River Town Hall was built in the early 1930s during the Great Depression with funds from the New Deal WPA.

In 1933 the cut-over east edge of the town of Jump River was designated part of the Chequamegon National Forest In 2007 an area in the southeast corner was designated the Bear Creek Hemlocks State Natural Area. Among a variety of flora, it contains two stands of old-growth hemlock.

== Geography ==
According to the United States Census Bureau, the town has a total area of 36.0 square miles (93.2 km^{2}), all land.

== Demographics ==
As of the census of 2000, there were 311 people, 118 households, and 82 families residing in the town. The population density was 8.6 people per square mile (3.3/km^{2}). There were 167 housing units at an average density of 4.6 per square mile (1.8/km^{2}). The racial makeup of the town was 96.78% White, 1.93% Native American, and 1.29% from two or more races.

There were 118 households, out of which 27.1% had children under the age of 18 living with them, 56.8% were married couples living together, 4.2% had a female householder with no husband present, and 29.7% were non-families. 24.6% of all households were made up of individuals, and 10.2% had someone living alone who was 65 years of age or older. The average household size was 2.64 and the average family size was 3.22.

In the town, the population was spread out, with 26.7% under the age of 18, 5.8% from 18 to 24, 27.0% from 25 to 44, 25.7% from 45 to 64, and 14.8% who were 65 years of age or older. The median age was 41 years. For every 100 females, there were 106.0 males. For every 100 females age 18 and over, there were 115.1 males.

The median income for a household in the town was $29,167, and the median income for a family was $53,125. Males had a median income of $25,625 versus $22,083 for females. The per capita income for the town was $18,286. About 4.9% of families and 8.5% of the population were below the poverty line, including none of those under age 18 and 6.1% of those age 65 or over.
