= Old College Hill Post Office =

- U.S. National Register of Historic Places
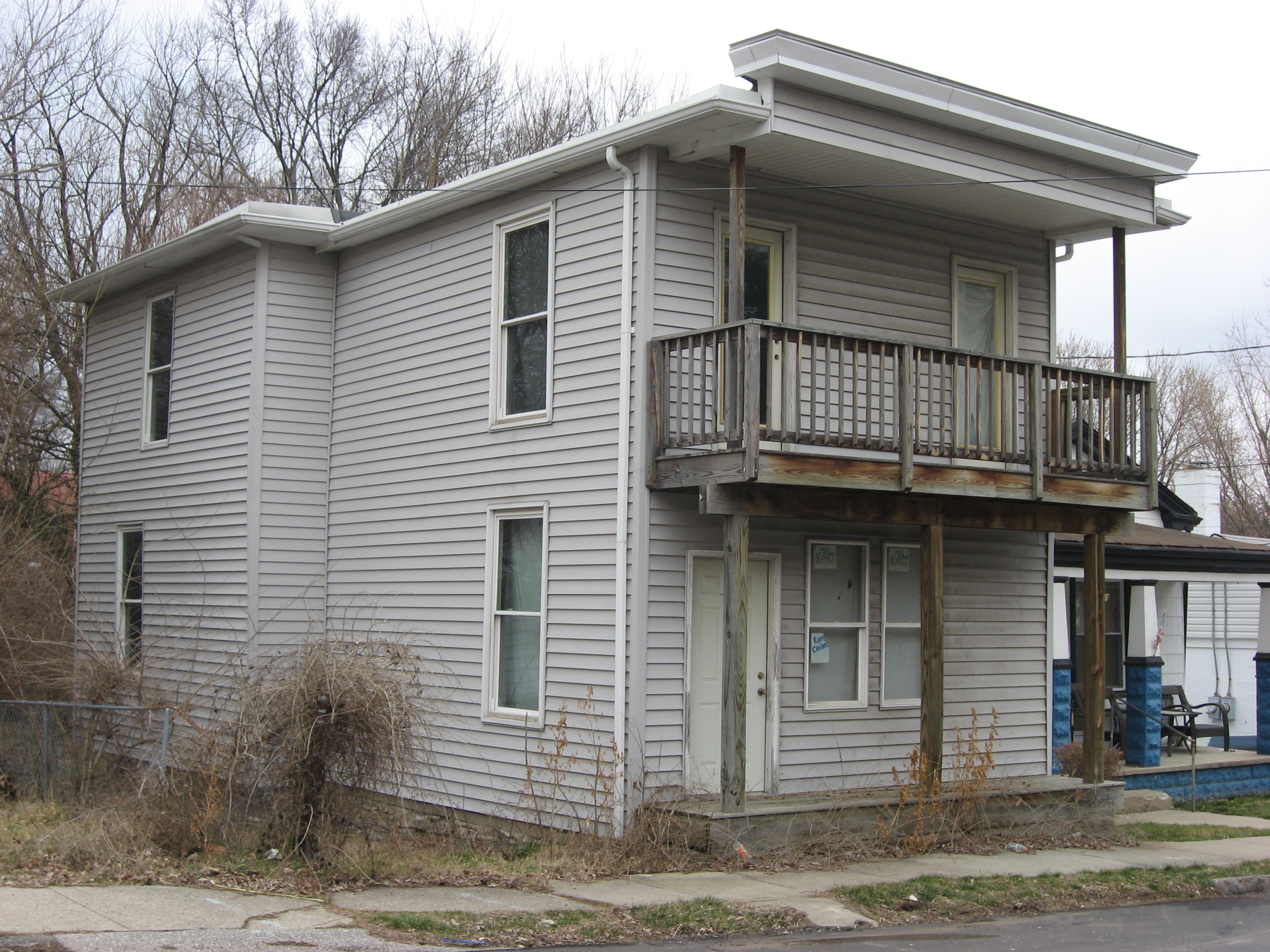
- Front and western side

- Location within Ohio Location within the United States
- Location: 1624 Pasadena Ave., Cincinnati, Ohio
- Coordinates: 39°11′31.5″N 84°32′49.5″W
- Area: Less than 1 acre (0.40 ha)
- Built: 1840
- NRHP reference No.: 76001437
- Added to NRHP: June 16, 1976

The Old College Hill Post Office is a historic former commercial building in the College Hill neighborhood of Cincinnati, Ohio, United States. Built in the 1840s to serve a tiny college town community, it has experienced extensive alterations, but enough of its original qualities remain that it was named a historic site in the 1970s.

Nehemiah Tunis bought land north of Cincinnati from John Cleves Symmes in 1796; although the land was long used for agriculture, a settlement grew up in the 19th century on part of the tract after two colleges were established: the precursor to the Ohio Military Institute, in 1833, and the Ohio Female College, in 1852. Once railroad service and public transportation arrived in the 1850s and 1860s, the community flourished, and it incorporated as "College Hill" in 1866. The community remained independent for approximately fifty years before being annexed into Cincinnati in pieces, beginning in 1911 and concluding in 1923. Numerous civic institutions existed during College Hill's time as a separate village, including a post office. The post office was actually older than most other improvements, having been built in 1840, while most other civic improvements were constructed after incorporation. It was not the first building to house postal operations in the community, as federal officials formally established the post office in September 1837 under the name of "Pleasant Hill, Ohio". Although it closed in 1838, operations were restored in 1842. Its name was changed to "Careys Academy, Ohio" two weeks after its restoration, and it became "College Hill, Ohio" in 1849. Service was discontinued in August 1892, when it became a station of the Cincinnati post office.

When the post office was constructed in 1840, it was a frame single-story structure; this early building has since been expanded, as a second story is now present; the date of construction for the second story is unknown. The basic form is that of a rectangle with doors and larger windows on the front, while the side possesses lesser fenestration. Two sections deviate from the basic plan: a rear addition that projects slightly to the side, and a two-story front porch with a door and balcony on the second floor. The walls are weatherboarded, and the building sits on a stone foundation. Into the late twentieth century, the eaves of the building's flat roof, which projects in front of the house over the front porch, ended in a cornice with bracketing. The old porch featured elaborately worked wooden columns on the first floor and simple posts on the second, while the second floor was guarded with a railing of panels. The post office has not retained its original commercial function, having instead been converted into a single-family residence.

In 1976, the Old College Hill Post Office was listed on the National Register of Historic Places, qualifying because of its well-preserved historic architecture; although modified, it is one of College Hill's oldest buildings. It is one of two buildings from the old village of College Hill to be listed on the National Register, along with the College Hill Town Hall.
