= Freeman Cary =

American educator (1810–1888)

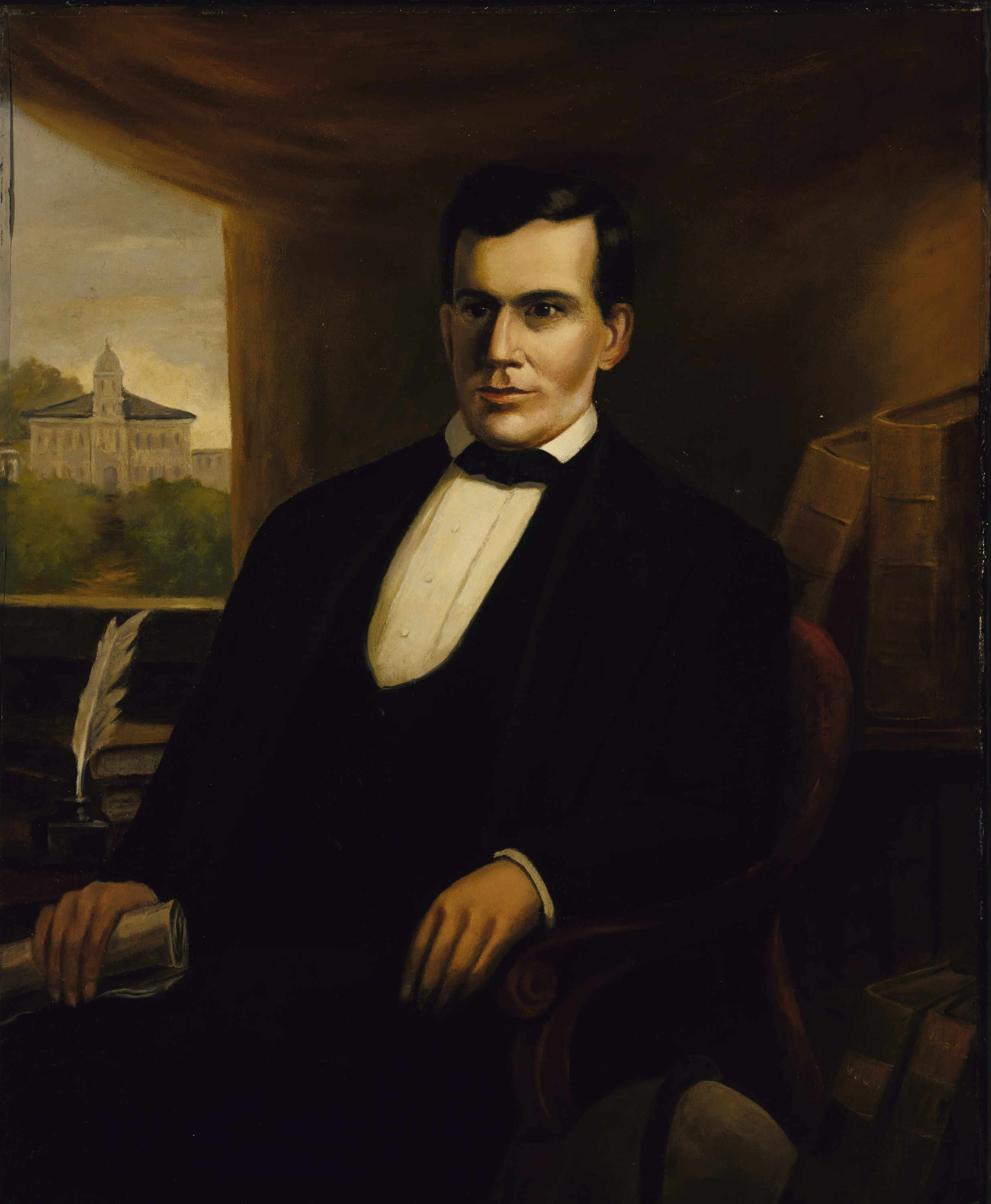
- Freeman Cary as painted by Robert S. Duncanson in 1856
- Born: Freeman Grant Cary; 7 April 1810
- Died: 26 August 1888 (aged 78)
- Education: Miami University
- Occupation: Educator

Freeman Grant Cary (7 April 1810 – 26 August 1888), was an educator in Pleasant Hill, Ohio. Cary attended Miami University and graduated with honors in the class of 1831. His brothers were William Woodward Cary and Samuel Fenton Cary. He started Cary Academy and was involved in the founding of Farmers' College. He was involved in the founding of the Ohio Female College.

Cary established and edited the agricultural periodical The Cincinnatus, which had wide circulation. He was a member of the Cincinnati Horticultural Society and became its president several times.
