= Louis and Elizabeth Woerner House =

Historic building in Portland, Oregon, U.S.

- U.S. National Register of Historic Places
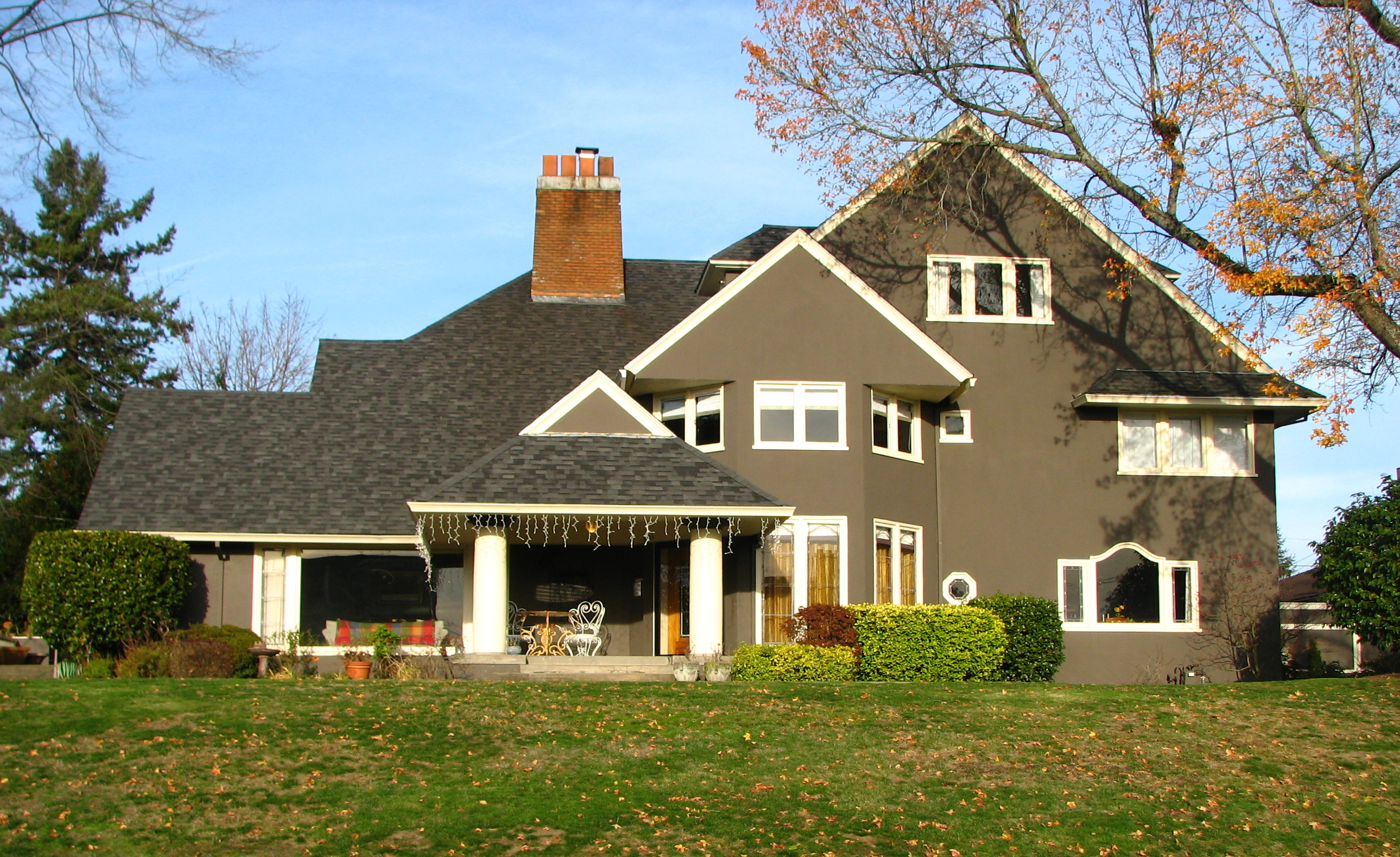
- The home in 2009

- Location within Oregon Location within the United States
- Location: 2815 NE Alameda St, Portland, Oregon
- Coordinates: 45°33′01.6″N 122°38′15.8″W
- Area: Less than one acre
- Built: 1922
- Architect: William Gray Purcell
- Architectural style: Bungalow/Craftsman
- NRHP reference No.: 05000516
- Added to NRHP: June 1, 2005

The Louis and Elizabeth Woerner House is a historic house in Portland, Oregon, United States. It was designed by Prairie School architect William Gray Purcell in 1922 and completed in early 1923. Located in the Alameda neighborhood in Northeast Portland, the house was added to the National Register of Historic Places (NRHP) in 2005.

== History ==
The house was built for Louis and Elizabeth Woerner. Louis Woerner was vice president of the Western Cooperage Company at the time the house plans were commissioned. The two-and-one-half story house is in the Arts and Crafts style, also known as American Craftsman. It has an asymmetric plan, with several steeply pitched gables visible from each side. The Woerner family lived in the house until it was sold in 1951. It then passed through several owners, each preserving the original character of the house. No major renovations to its footprint have been made since it was constructed, the most significant changes were an interior remodel of the kitchen and updates to the bathrooms.

The house is a locally significant example of Arts and Crafts architecture, but its primary historical significance derives from its noted Minneapolis architect, William Gray Purcell. Purcell was active in Oregon from 1919 until 1930, when an advanced case of tuberculosis forced him to seek a warmer, drier climate in California. During his stay in Oregon, he designed and marketed standardized plans for homes intended for families of modest means. The Woerner house is one of five upscale custom houses he designed in the Portland area in 1920–1924. The Woerner house is the most visible, due to its location atop a small rise on a large lot.
