= Cornelia Laws St. John =

American poet

- Born: Cornelia Ellicott Williams; Unknown; College Hill, Ohio, U.S.
- Died: February 24, 1902; New York City, New York, U.S.
- Education: Ohio Female College
- Occupation: Writer
- Spouses: Joseph P. Laws (m. 1857; died ?); Mr. St. John (m. ?)
- Children: Mae Bramhall (daughter)
- Writing career
- Genres: Poetry, biography
- Notable work: "Six Little Feet on the Fender"

Cornelia Laws St. John (née, Williams; after first marriage, Laws; after second marriage, St. John; died February 24, 1902) was an American poet and biographer. She was the author of "Over the Shoulder is Clovernook, Being a Backward Glance at Alice and Phoebe Cary in Their Early Home". Her best known poem was Six Little Feet on the Fender.

== Early life and education ==
Cornelia Ellicott Williams was born in College Hill, Ohio, near Cincinnati. Her father was M. C. Williams of College Hill. She had at least one sibling, a brother, Wilber W. Williams, who became the pay inspector of the U.S. Navy.

She was educated at the Ohio Female College, at College Hill, where she received high marks for the elegance of her composition, in prose and verse, and for skill in music.

== Career ==
During her residence in Richmond, Indiana, she wrote many of her most popular poems.

Her poems appeared in the Cincinnati Commercial Tribune, the St. Louis Democrat, and Journal, and some of them were extensively copied by the press. She first published, The Empty Chair, in 1856; the next year, Six Little Feet on the Fender and Behind the Post. Of The Empty Chair, as it first appeared in the Cincinnati Commercial Tribune, George Washington Cutter thus wrote to that paper:—

"If my poor judgment is worth any thing in matters of this kind, I unhesitatingly pronounce it "beautiful exceedingly". I know of few poems in our language, that, for freshness and originality of thought, justness of metaphor, picturesque arrangement, pleasing melody, and depth of pathos, surpass or even approach this 'gem of purest ray serene,' these beautiful buds of promise." These commendations apply with still more force to some of her later compositions."

St. John is best known by her verses entitled, "Six Little Feet on the Fender". She was also the author of "Over the Shoulder to Clovernook, Being a Backward Glance at Alice and Phoebe Cary in Their Early Home" (1892).

== Personal life ==
St. John was married first, in 1857, at Syracuse, New York, to Joseph P. Laws, a merchant of Richmond, Indiana, where they resided after marriage.

Some years after the death of her first husband, she married secondly, Mr. St. John, and then made her home in Chicago. Later, she mourned the death of her second daughter, Mae Bramhall, the author of Japanese Jingles and The Wee Ones of Japan.

St. John died in New York City on February 24, 1902.

== "Six Little Feet on the Fender" ==
In my heart there liveth a picture,
Of a kitchen rude and old,
Where the firelight tripped o'er the rafters,
And reddened the roof's brown mould;
Gilding the steam from the kettle
That hummed on the foot-worn hearth,
Throughout all the livelong evening
Its measure of drowsy mirth.

== Selected works ==
=== Poems ===
- "The Empty Chair", 1856
- "Six Little Feet on the Fender", 1857 (by Cornelia W. Laws)
- "Behind the Post", 1857

=== Articles ===
- "Over the Shoulder to Clovernook, Being a Backward Glance at Alice and Phoebe Cary in Their Early Home", 1892 (by Cornelia Laws-St. John)
