= Oliver W. Nixon =

American teacher, army surgeon, author and newspaper editor

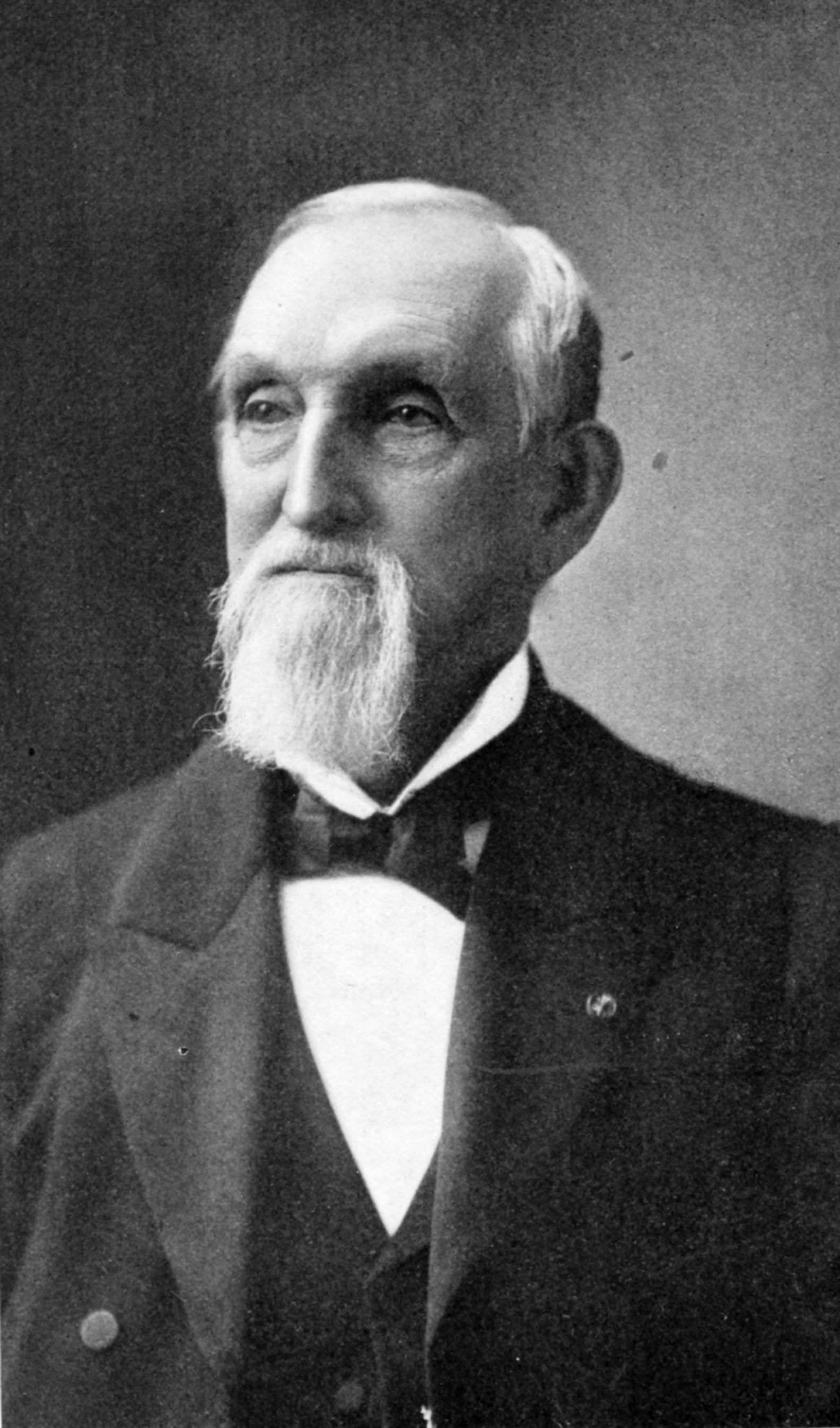
Image of O. W. Nixon

Oliver Woodson Nixon (October 25, 1825 - May 9, 1905) was a teacher, army surgeon, author, and newspaper editor in the United States. He graduated from Farmer's College outside Cincinnati, Ohio.

He was born in Guilford County, North Carolina. He was the son of Samuel and Rhoda née Hubbard Nixon and the grandson of abolitionist Quakers Barnabas and Sarah née Hunnicutt Nixon. He was a descendant of Phineas and Mary Nixon. He graduated from Farmer's College and received an M.D. from Jefferson Medical College in 1854. He married Louise Elstun of Mt. Carmel, Ohio the same year.

During the American Civil War he was a surgeon for the 39th Ohio volunteers, medical director of the Army of the Mississippi, and a member of Gen. John Pope's staff. After the war he served as treasurer of Hamilton County, Ohio for two terms.

He established the Evening Chronicle in Cincinnati in 1870 with his brother William Penn Nixon. After they merged it with the Cincinnati Times, he and his brother acquired the Inter Ocean in Chicago. He wrote for the San Francisco Call. He wrote a book about Marcus Whitman in which he attempted to correct the injustice that he felt had been done to him. He married and had a son. He died in Biloxi, Mississippi. He was to be buried in Fountain City, Indiana.

== Writings ==
- Whitman's Ride Through Savage Lands, with Sketches of Indian Life
- How Marcus Whitman Saved Oregon: A True Romance of Patriotic Heroism Christian Devotion and Final Martyrdom
- "Whitman's Ride", a promotional publication in support of the Whitman Memorial Fund
