= William Gray Purcell =

American architect (1880–1965)

William Gray Purcell (July 2, 1880 – April 11, 1965) was an American architect of the Prairie School in the Midwestern United States. He partnered with George Grant Elmslie, and briefly with George Feick. The firm of Purcell & Elmslie produced designs for buildings in twenty-two states, Australia, and China. The firm had offices in Minneapolis, Minnesota; Chicago, Illinois; Philadelphia, Pennsylvania; and Portland, Oregon.

== Early life and education ==
Purcell was born in Wilmette, Illinois on July 2, 1880. His parents, Charles A. and Anna Cora Purcell lived first with William Cunningham and Catherine Garns Gray, Anna's parents, in Oak Park, Illinois. Although the Purcells eventually moved into their own home, except for brief periods the young boy remained with his grandparents over the next five years. In 1886, William Gray Purcell began living permanently with them at his own request. His father was an important grain trader, and his grandfather was editor of The Interior, and a writer of national repute.

For many summers, W. C. Gray had taken fishing vacations on the peninsula of upper Michigan. In 1885, however, he was saddened to realize the extent to which the environment had been despoiled by destructive logging and mining practices. In 1886 Gray arranged the purchase of three square miles of land surrounding an island on a lake in northern Wisconsin, in co-ownership with the recently widowed Nettie Fowler McCormick, also of Chicago. Every following summer from 1887 until his death in 1901, Gray brought his family, friends, and associates to Island Lake Camp, as the isolated forest enclave came to be called.

During this time Purcell became skilled as a photographer, his hobby made possible by the newly available commercial outfits which supplied camera, photographic plates, processing chemicals and printing papers in one package. Purcell received his first camera from W. C. Gray in 1888, a Kodak model given to The Interior office just before public release of the product.

When Purcell was fifteen, Frank Lloyd Wright built his Oak Park studio on the same block where Charles A. Purcell lived, not far from the Grays. In Chicago, where Purcell went frequently to visit his grandfather at The Interior offices, the work of Louis Sullivan continued to impress the young architect-to-be. His mind was already made up to pursue the study of the building arts in college and, following his graduation from Oak Park High School in 1899, he entered the School of Architecture at Cornell University in Ithaca, New York.

While he was still enrolled in school, Purcell was hired by William E. Benson (1873–1915) to draw architectural designs for the historically African American village of Kowaliga, Alabama, which had goals of expanding their housing. Unfortunately none of the designs for Kowaliga were built.

== Career ==
After graduation from Cornell in 1903, Purcell returned to Oak Park, Illinois. Purcell considered applying to Frank Lloyd Wright for a position in his architectural practice. Instead, Purcell took a clerking position with Ezra E. Roberts, a stable and prosperous architect of whom Charles A. Purcell thought well. During a dinner party in Oak Park, Purcell met George Grant Elmslie, then the chief draftsman for Louis Sullivan. The two men liked one another immediately, not least because of their shared interest in progressive architecture. When Purcell complained of his situation with Roberts, Elmslie offered to secure Purcell a position in the Sullivan office. However, there was not a great deal of work to be done in the office. Purcell spent five months there, from August to December 1903.

In 1904, Purcell ventured to the West Coast by way of an extended journey through the southwestern United States. He eventually arrived at Los Angeles and applied for work at the office of Myron Hunt, but there was no opening. On the recommendation of those with whom he interviewed, Purcell left southern California for San Francisco. Hired by John Galen Howard, Purcell became clerk of the works for the construction of California Hall, being built on the University of California campus at Berkeley. In 1905 Purcell moved farther up the coast to Seattle, Washington, where he worked for several months in the office of A. Warren Gould.

Purcell's father, who was afraid of the effects of the region's weather on the health of his son, offered to send him on a year-long tour of Europe. Accepting the offer, Purcell contacted his former classmate, George Feick, Jr., and two men agreed to meet in New York. In April, 1906 Purcell and Feick were greeted upon their landing at Naples, Italy, by the eruption of Mount Vesuvius. After visiting Florence and Venice, they traveled across Greece to Constantinople and by June had returned to western Europe. Purcell was keen to seek out the best contemporary design and, remembering a suggestion made by Elmslie he stopped in Holland to visit the architect Hendrik Petrus Berlage. Berlage received him warmly and the two established a long-lasting friendship. Purcell was also successful in his efforts to reach Scandinavia, where he met progressive architects Ferdinand Boberg and M. Nyrop. These contacts added to his growing desire to commence his own work and shortly after returning to the United States, Purcell moved to Minneapolis, Minnesota, to open an office in partnership with George Feick, Jr.

The architectural practice most widely known as Purcell & Elmslie consisted of three partnerships. The first, Purcell & Feick, was formed in 1907. George Elmslie was an informal influence in the work of Purcell & Feick. During the last months of 1909 Louis Sullivan could no longer pay George Elmslie because of declining business fortunes, and Elmslie was forced to find a more reliable situation. By 1910 Elmslie had left the Sullivan office and moved to Minneapolis as a full partner in Purcell, Feick & Elmslie.

George Elmslie brought important business contacts that resulted in a growing number of commissions from former Sullivan clients. George Feick followed leads for projects in his hometown and handled small buildings for friends and acquaintances. Purcell continued to develop productive friendships with men who lived in small towns throughout the Midwest, which created a network of sympathizers who kept the firm advised of potential jobs. Over the course of the partnership, Purcell & Elmslie became one of the most commissioned firms among the Prairie School architects, second only to Frank Lloyd Wright.

During these years of success, personal events brought substantial changes to the lives of both Purcell and Elmslie. Profoundly affected by the death of his wife in 1912, Elmslie left Minneapolis in March 1913 and returned to Chicago where he opened a second Purcell, Feick & Elmslie office. George Feick did not completely share the intense dedication of Purcell and Elmslie to the new architecture, and in 1913 left Minneapolis to rejoin his father's business in Sandusky, Ohio. After the Woodbury County Courthouse was completed in 1918, the business of the firm entered a decline. Purcell requested the dissolution of the Purcell & Elmslie partnership in 1921.

Purcell moved to Portland, Oregon in November 1919 to join his cousin, Charles H. Purcell, in a bridge building company called the Pacific States Engineering Corporation (PSEC). After the dissolution of the firm of Purcell & Elmslie, Purcell marketed standardized plans through a variety of service firm names. The Pacific States Engineering Corporation (PSEC) houses were a mainstay of Purcell's architectural practice during the 1920s. Purcell also became involved with the Architect's Small House Service Bureau (ASHSB,) and associated himself with other area architects in numerous residential designs in and around the Portland area. He also became increasingly active in professional, civic, and arts organizations.

In 1925, Purcell met James Van Evera Bailey, a young architect who was an integral participant in both the design and construction process for four houses built during the Portland years. The largest and final major commission that Purcell received was the Third Church of Christ Scientist, in Portland, completed in 1926.

Throughout the decade, Purcell had felt a progressive decline in his physical well-being and, finally seeking medical attention in 1930, was diagnosed as having advanced tuberculosis. He closed his architectural practice and moved to a sanatorium in Banning, California. Following successful lung surgery, Purcell retired to an estate in the foothills of Southern California, near Pasadena. He continued to develop and support the cause of American architecture for another thirty years, mostly through publishing many essays, consulting with architectural historians, and other writings.

Purcell turned to writing and began an articulation of his views on art and architecture that continued prolifically until his death. Two projects were of special importance to him. From the late 1930s to the mid 1950s, he developed a series of unpublished essays called "The Parabiographies" that were commission-by-commission accounts of experiences during his architectural practice. These pages, together with many manuscripts discussing Sullivan and the "function and form" thesis, were sent for reading to George Elmslie who often added his own annotations. From 1940 to 1955, Purcell was principal contributing editor to an architectural journal, Northwest Architect, to which he contributed more than sixty articles.

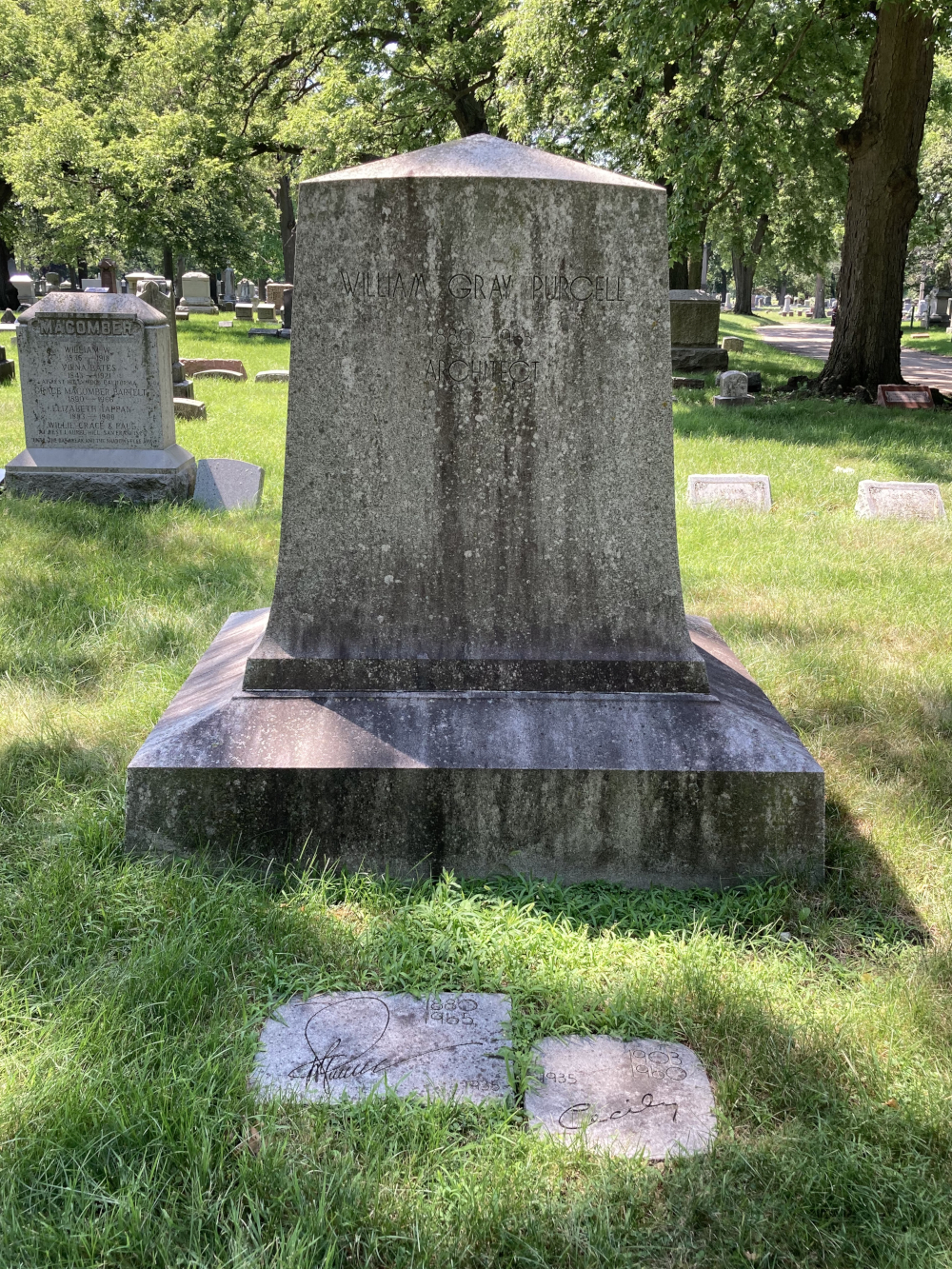
Purcell's grave at Forest Home Cemetery

During 1962–1963, Purcell had an architectural apprentice who would go on to become a significant American organic architect, Arthur Dyson. Dyson spent nearly a year in the Taliesin Fellowship prior to the death of Frank Lloyd Wright in 1959, before going to work for notable organic architect Bruce Goff, who gave Dyson a copy of a catalog from an exhibition about Purcell and Elmslie that took place in Minneapolis. Dyson sought out Purcell as a mentor. The two men spent their time together reviewing the records of Purcell and Elmslie and discussing the nature of architectural design.

After his death on April 11, 1965, he was buried in Forest Home Cemetery in Forest Park, Illinois.

== Works ==
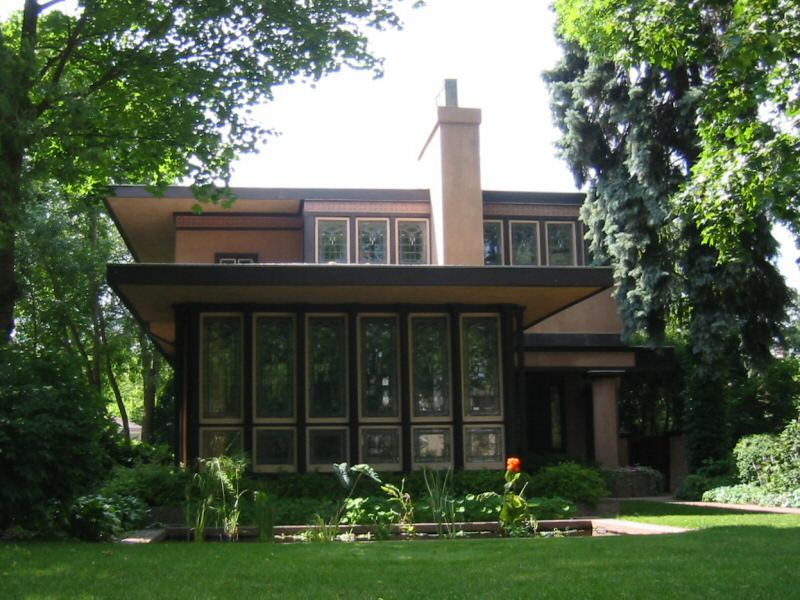
Purcell's second house, originally named "Lake Place"

There are two houses built by William Gray Purcell for his personal residence in Minneapolis. The second was built in 1913 and called "Lake Place" by the Purcell family. Known now as the Edna S. Purcell House, the house is maintained by the Minneapolis Institute of Arts and is listed on the National Register of Historic Places.

His "Maryhill" in Edina, Minnesota, is interesting because of the documentation of how it was created. It was designed by Purcell in correspondence with the future owners, Paul and Mary Carson, and the 600 pieces of their correspondence are in the University of Minnesota's Architectural Archives.

Not all of Purcell's work fits in the "Prairie School" category. Several of his houses in Portland's West Hills show how he adapted his ideas to fit a more urban setting. A feature shared by one of those houses and Maryhill is a sleeping loft, but the Portland example also features a wooden carving of Nils on his goose flying out over the living room.

In the 1920s, Purcell moved to the Pacific Northwest where he designed a number of "cotswald" style homes.

In 1922, Purcell designed the Louis and Elizabeth Woerner House in the Alameda District of Portland's Eastside. The house was added to the National Register of Historic Places (NRHP) in 2004.

In the 1930s Purcell moved to Pasadena, California. In Pasadena, Purcell first built Moderne work. His only known surviving Moderne building is his own vacation home in Palm Springs. Purcell after WW2 seems to have fully embraced modernism and some five homes designed by him from 1945 to 1965 survive in Pasadena in various levels of modification.

The William Gary Purcell papers were donated by the estate to the Northwest Architectural Archives 1965. The collection contains drawings, including plans, elevations and sections, for much of the firm's work, together with renderings, sketches, photographs and correspondence. Letters, photographs and books from Purcell's maternal grandfather (William Cunningham Gray, 1830–1901) form part of the collection. Also present in the papers are manuscripts, typescripts, and clippings.

== Achievements and publications ==
Purcell was elected a Fellow in the American Institute of Architects in 1963.

Purcell is the author of the 1967 book, St. Croix Trail Country: Recollections of Wisconsin, a memoir of his youth spent in the Wisconsin lake country.
