= Edna S. Purcell House =

Historic house in Minnesota, United States

- U.S. National Register of Historic Places
- Minneapolis Landmark
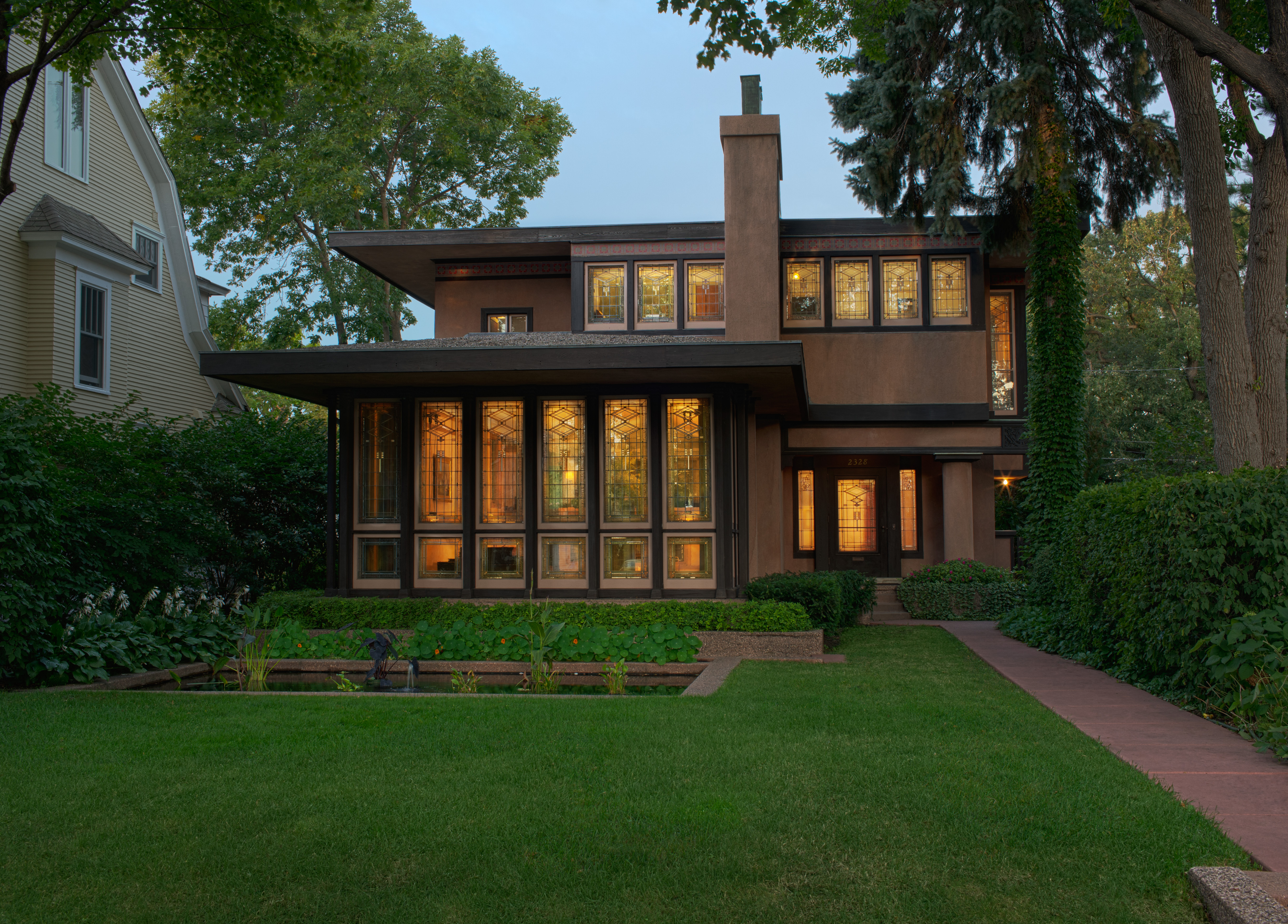
- The east facade of the Edna S. Purcell (now Purcell–Cutts) House.
- Location: 2328 Lake Place, Minneapolis, MN
- Coordinates: 44°57′33.61″N 93°18′1.73″W
- Built: 1913
- Architect: Purcell & Elmslie
- Architectural style: Prairie School
- NRHP reference No.: 74001024

Significant dates
- Added to NRHP: October 29, 1974
- Designated MPLSL: 1975

The Edna S. Purcell House (now the Purcell–Cutts House) was designed by the firm of Purcell, Feick and Elmslie for architect William Purcell and his family in 1913. It is located in Minneapolis, Minnesota.

The dwelling is a notable example of Prairie School architecture, featuring a long, narrow floor plan that disregards Victorian concepts about room divisions. It was added to the National Register of Historic Places in 1974. It is now part of the collection of the Minneapolis Institute of Art and has been extensively restored. The museum conducts tours on the second weekend of every month.

== History ==
The Edna Purcell dwelling, as it was referred to in its original project files, was built in 1913. William Purcell and partner George Elmslie collaborated on the house, designed for a narrow, 50- by 150-foot city lot near Lake of the Isles in Minneapolis, Minnesota; construction costs totaled $14,500. While George Feick Jr., appears as a partner on the project, he was not involved in the house's design and left the partnership that year.

William Purcell and his wife, Edna, conceived plans for a permanent home in 1911, while they were residing in an apartment building on Humboldt Avenue in Minneapolis. Having adopted their son James that year, they needed a new space for their daily needs that also accommodated their increased social activity and showcased the architectural firm's expertise.

The house was built at 2328 Lake Place, near the residence that Purcell and Feick had built for William Purcell's mother, Catherine Gray, on Lake of the Isles Parkway in 1907. With financial assistance from William Purcell's father, Charles A. Purcell, the firm was able to realize the project. The Purcell family moved into the house at Christmas, 1913. In 1916, a decline in commissions induced Purcell to take a position as advertising manager at Alexander Brothers Leather and Belting Company in Philadelphia. By 1918, his family had all moved to Philadelphia, and the house on Lake Place was put up for sale.

In 1919, Anson Bailey Cutts Sr. (1866–1949), a chief rate clerk with the Great Northern Railway, purchased the Edna S. Purcell house. Cutts and his wife, Edna Browning Stokes (1875–1976), lived in the house with their son, Anson B. Cutts Jr. (1905–1985). Though he left the house to attend Yale and pursue his career, Anson Jr. returned to the house in 1962 to aid his widowed mother when her health was failing. He continued to live there after her death in 1976. In 1985, Cutts bequeathed the house to the Minneapolis Society of Fine Arts, parent organization of the Minneapolis Institute of Art. It now is part of the museum's collection.

== Architecture ==
=== Plan and exterior features ===
The Edna S. Purcell house, or the “Little Joker,” as Elmslie nicknamed it, is known for its innovative arrangement of space. Occupying a deep, narrow lot, the plan of the house was organized on a single axis, open from one end to the other, evoking spaciousness within the relatively small interior.

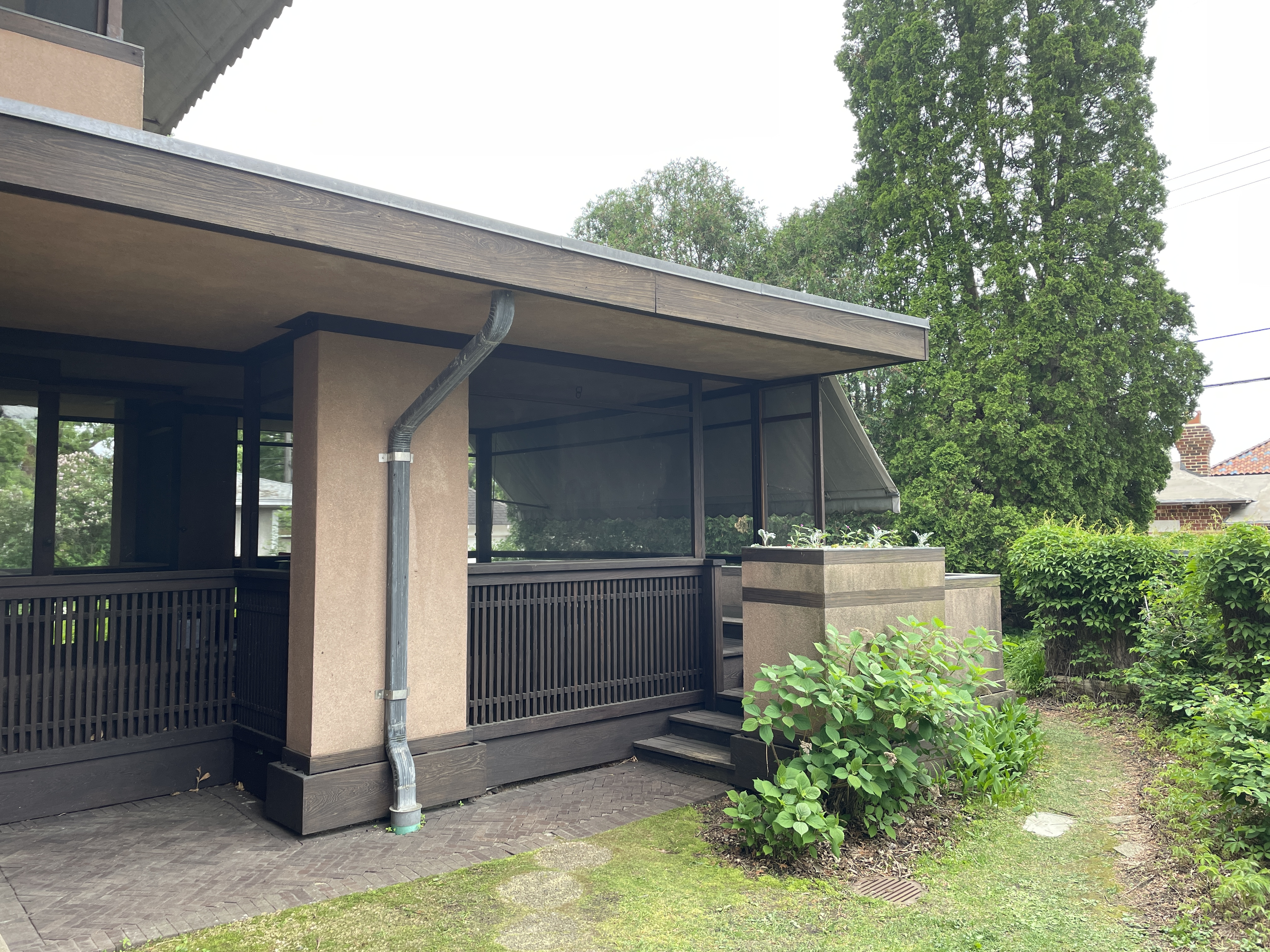
The back porch of the Purcell–Cutts House.

Purcell and Elmslie set the house thirty feet behind the front property line, conserving a sense of privacy for its inhabitants and allowing them to look over their neighbors’ gardens to their north and south, rather than through their windows. Likewise, the Purcells and the neighbors could enjoy the home's front garden, created in collaboration with landscape architect Harry Franklin Baker, including a reflecting pool with water plants and small fountain, and native plants and trees. The back porch overlooked the Lake of the Isles, where the Purcells could enjoy a secluded natural haven in the center of Minneapolis, in concordance with Prairie School ideals.

The structure of the house is steel-reinforced, with a buff-colored stucco exterior, built on a concrete foundation. Its overall design and decoration emphasizes a clean, modern aesthetic while serving practical functions and staying in harmony with natural surroundings. Overhanging eaves, with a 7-foot projection of the roof at the front (east) side of the house, emphasize the building's horizontality while also regulating heat and light at its entrance. A front wall of art glass windows connects the dwelling's interior to the garden, with bands of windows on the upper story adding to the sense of horizontality. Wooden piers and trim were all given “jin-di-sugi” treatment, a wood-aging technique based on traditional Japanese techniques using the application of chemicals or burning to artificially age wood.

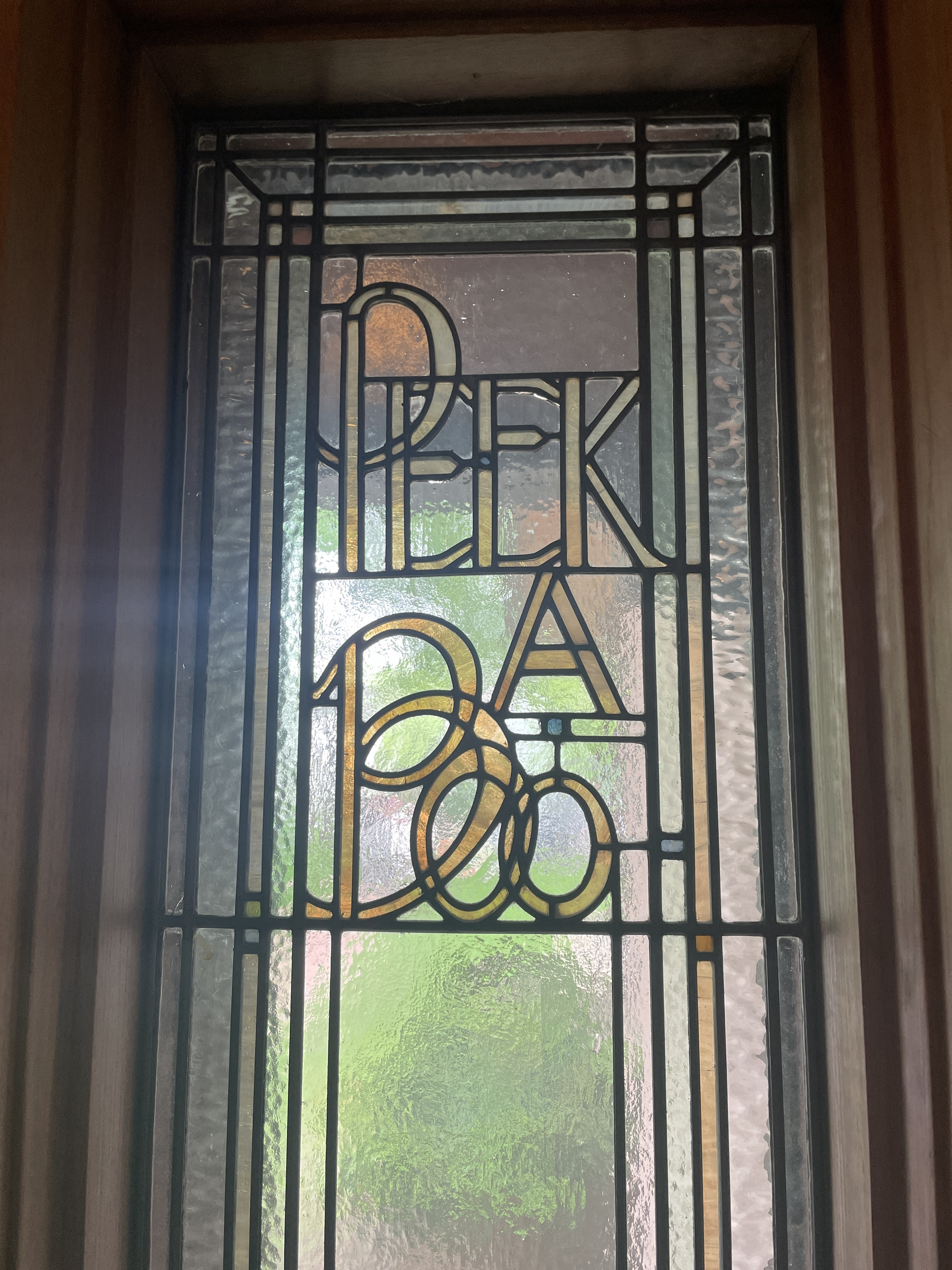
A stained glass window in the Purcell Cutts House with the words Peek-A-Boo.

The exterior features ornamentation created by George Elmslie, including bands of red and blue stenciled square motifs and sawn wood elements. These include playful symbols of Purcell's family life: for example, a sawn wood beam-end decoration above the side gate that includes the motto, “Gray Days and Gold,” in reference to Purcell's grandparents, the Grays, to the colors of the firm's progressive architecture, and to the funds supporting Purcell's architectural practice and house. Two art glass windows flanking the entryway door contain a written message for neighbors and callers: “Peek-a-Boo.”

=== Interior ===
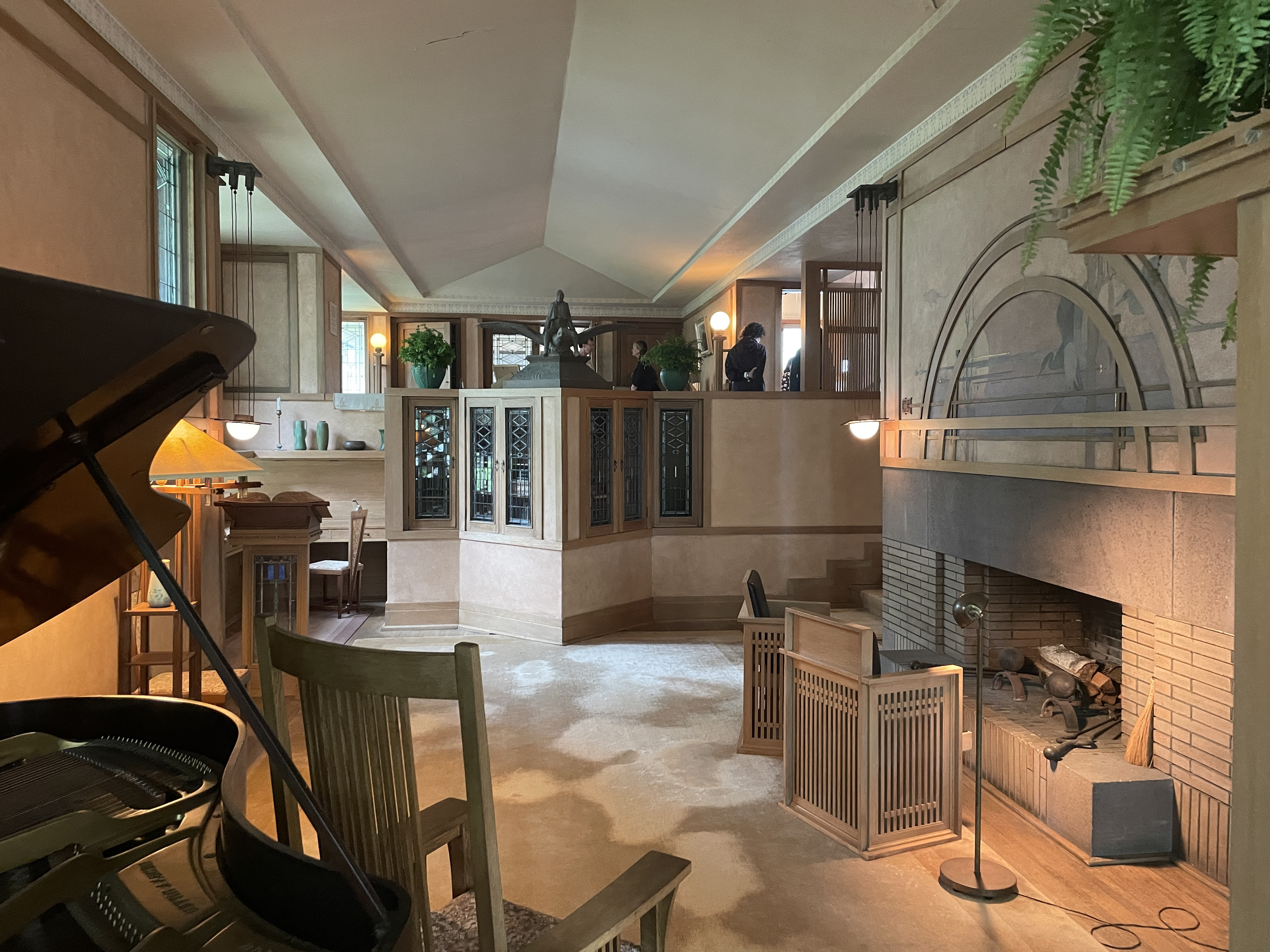
The open plan with the living room at a lower level than the dining room.

Though open-plan, the first-level interior of the Purcell–Cutts House features individual room areas by virtue of alterations in floor level and breadth of floor space, while the tented ceiling maintains the same height throughout. The ground floor living room area at the front of the house features a high ceiling, increasing available space for the repeated pairs of art glass windows that comprise the walls of the front of the living room, while the dining area behind, set a half-story above, has a low ceiling. The pointed prow separating the dining and living areas creates a small nook, reserved as Edna Purcell's writing area. The effect of the main level's design is to maintain intimacy within the larger space, not rendering adjacent spaces automatically visible in main areas of the house, while preserving unity between rooms and the openness of the entire floor.

The second floor is accessed by a stairway on the north side, and includes a small hallway opening to a guest bedroom with sink, a bathroom, and the family bedroom space. The latter is a singular suite which could be divided by a built-in folding screen wall, separating it into children's and master bedrooms. The maid's room is accessed off the stair landing, which is surrounded by wraparound wall of art glass windows.

==== Decoration, furniture, and other features ====
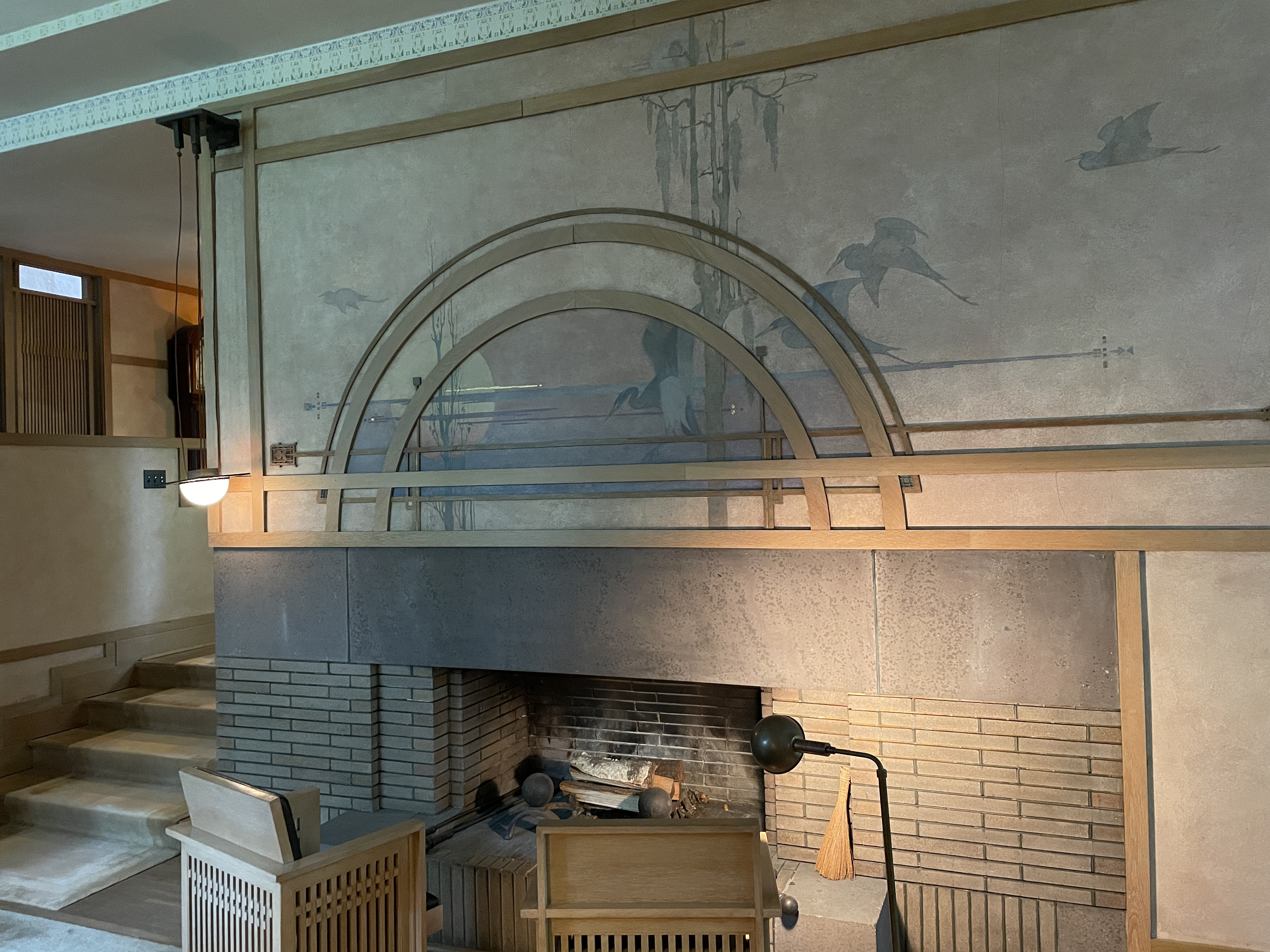
The fireplace with the mural by Charles Livingston Bull.

Throughout the house's interior, painted Elmslie-designed stencils repeat along the upper border of walls, with designs differing from room to room. Curtains were originally painted to match the rooms’ respective stencils, or were embroidered with other designs. Windows throughout the house also feature graceful geometric patterns of clear glass, highlighted with subtle colors, which vary slightly from window to window. In the first floor living room space, these patterns echo in art glass doors of the bookcase, built into the prow. Above the mantel-less fireplace, a mural by illustrator Charles Livingston Bull depicts Louisiana herons flying before a lake scene. A wood decoration of semicircular design, decorated with art glass and sawed wood decoration, partially frames the painted scene.

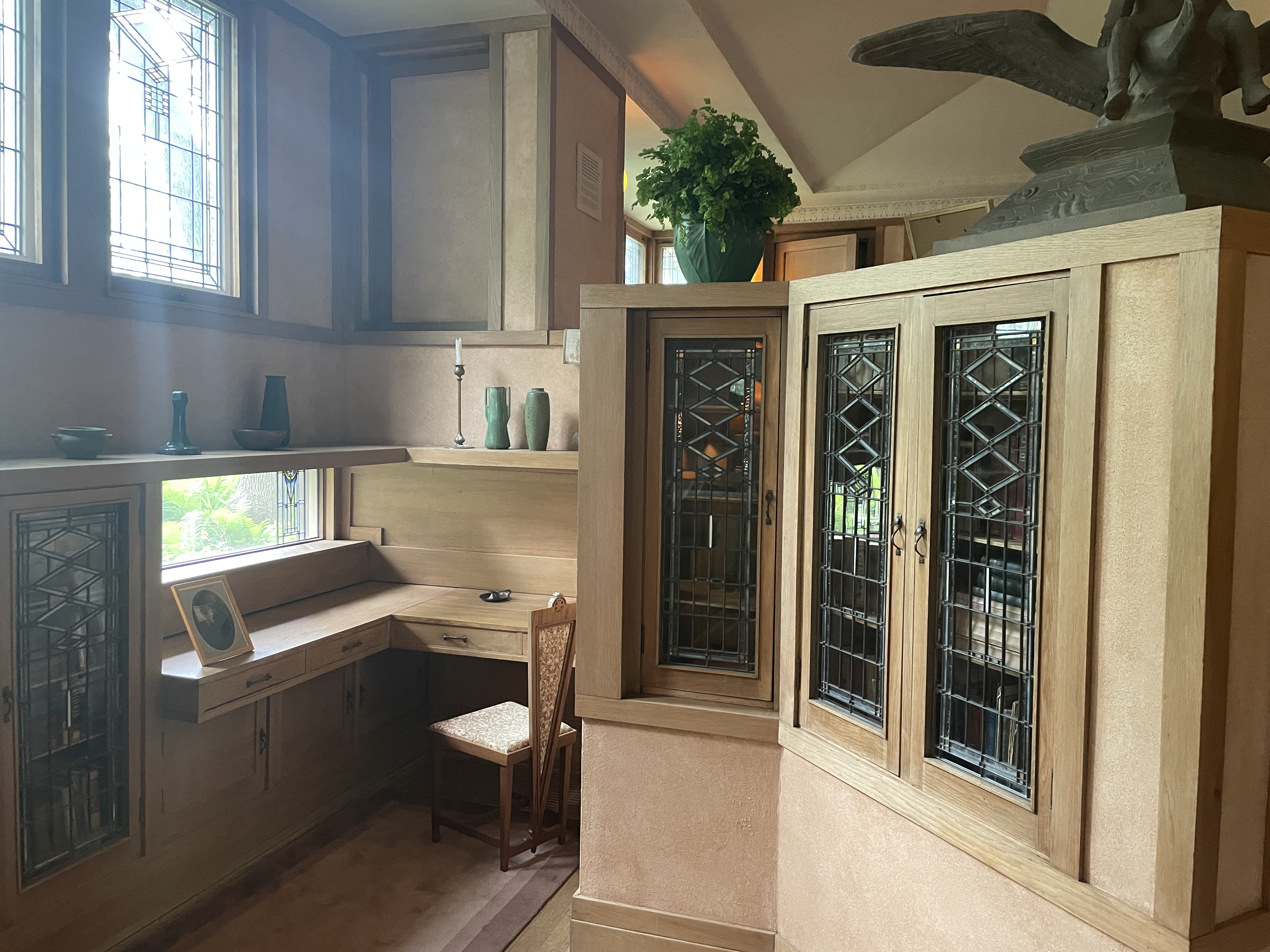
The writing nook located on the lower level.

Purcell and Elmslie designed select pieces of furniture for the house, including a small, triangular-backed chair, dubbed a “surprise point” chair by William Purcell, for use in Edna's writing nook. Several noteworthy built-in furnishings include a combined bench and radiator cover beneath the front living room windows; a desk in the writing nook; and a combined bed, writing desk, bookcase, and storage area in the children's room, which Purcell designed after the Pullman-style bed of a train's sleeping car. Purcell brought furniture from his previous home for use in the dining space, and folding chairs were stored in the dining area for impromptu visitors.

Several technological innovations were incorporated into the house's design, including a state-of-the-art heating and cooling system, as well as a central vacuum system. The Purcell home had a telephone nook, an electric call system for the maid, and a spring-loaded pocket door to the kitchen, activated through buttons in the floor.

== Alteration and restoration ==
William Purcell resumed correspondence with the Cutts family around 1953, when he and George Elmslie were honored with an exhibition at the Walker Art Center. The Cutts family had avoided changing the house substantially, except for adding a garage in the 1920s and later filling the reflecting pool in the front garden. The kitchen and bathroom remained nearly untouched, and are rare original service areas in a home of this age.

In 1961 letter, Purcell expressed his gratitude to Edna Cutts for opening her home to students and voiced the desire to have a share in any attempts to restore the house or make it public. Purcell also sketched out a scheme for expanding the space around the house and setting up a trust fund for the building. He imagined reproducing the Purcell and Elmslie dining suite designed for Mrs. William H. Hanna of Chicago. The suite is now in the collection of the Minneapolis Institute of Art, renting the space to young couples at low rates, and allowing regular public entry.

Though Purcell's plans did not come to fruition in his lifetime, Anson Cutts Jr.’s bequest of the house, along with funds for its restoration, led to a 3-year-long undertaking (lasting from 1987 to 1990) by the Minneapolis Institute of Arts with the firm of MacDonald & Mack Architects. It was opened to the public as the Purcell–Cutts House in September 1990. Their restorative work centered on preventing further deterioration of the roof of the house, stabilizing the main roof and straightening the cantilever of the projecting first-story eaves. Restorers also worked to return surfaces to their original color, re-tinting exterior stucco, and preserving, restoring, or repainting interior stencil friezes as necessary. Wood trims were refinished and waxed, and the mural by Charles Livingston Bull was cleaned. The art glass windows were repaired and cleaned. The landscaping, including the reflecting pool and fountain, were recreated to match historic photographs. Based on historic evidence, the MIA reproduced furniture for the house including a reproduction of the Hanna suite for the dining room. As a part of the house's bequest, mementos of the Cutts family also remain. Public tours are held the second weekend of each month.

== Significance ==
The Edna S. Purcell House was known to architects of its time, published and pictured extensively in the Western Architect. It was also published with several photographs in the March 1917 issue of The Minnesotan. Purcell himself, and later architectural scholars like David Gebhard and H. Allen Brooks, would declare the house to be one of the most complete works of architecture by the firm of Purcell and Elmslie, if not the most complete.

The many modern features of the home, including its open plan, flexible room spaces, built-in furniture, and technologically advanced amenities pointed toward the future of home design. Contrasting it with the expensive houses built concurrently by Frank Lloyd Wright, the Purcell home's modern considerations accommodated for fewer servants and limited daily issues of maintenance, while giving flexibility for use and daily living, providing for the lifestyle of a young early 20th-century family.

== Bibliography ==
- Brooks, H. Allen. The Prairie School: Frank Lloyd Wright and his Midwest Contemporaries. Toronto: University of Toronto Press, 1972.
- Brooks, H. Allen, ed. Prairie School Architecture: Studies from ‘The Western Architect.’ New York: Van Nostrand Reinhold Company, 1983.
- Conforti, Michael, et al. Minnesota 1900: Art and Life on the Upper Mississippi 1890–1915. Newark : University of Delaware Press, 1994.
- Gebhard, David. “William Gray Purcell and George Grant Elmslie: Early Progressive Movement in American Architecture from 1900 to 1920, v. 1–2.” Diss. Minneapolis State U, 1957. Print.
- Kliment, Stephen A., ed. “At Home on the Prairie.” Architectural Record: Preservation, March 1991: 144–151.
- Kohls, Ann. “The Art of Architecture: The Purcell–Cutts House, now part of the museum’s collection, is respectfully restored.” Arts Magazine, August 1990, 12.
- Kronick, Richard L. “The Underachieving Cantilever.” Old House Journal, June 1997: 40–45.
- Olivarez, Jennifer Komar, et al. Progressive Design in the Midwest: The Purcell–Cutts House and the Prairie School Collection at the Minneapolis Institute of Arts. Minneapolis, Minn. : Institute of Arts : Distributed by the University of Minnesota Press, 2000.
- William Gray Purcell papers, N3, Northwest Architectural Archives, University of Minnesota Libraries, Minneapolis, MN.
- “Where Other People Live: Describing briefly the Attractive home of a Minneapolis architect, William Gray Purcell, President of the Minnesota chapter of A.I.A., who designed his own home to express a real and useful idea in planning for the convenience and beauty of home life.” The Minnesotan, March 1917: 21–23.
