= Arthur Dyson =

American architect

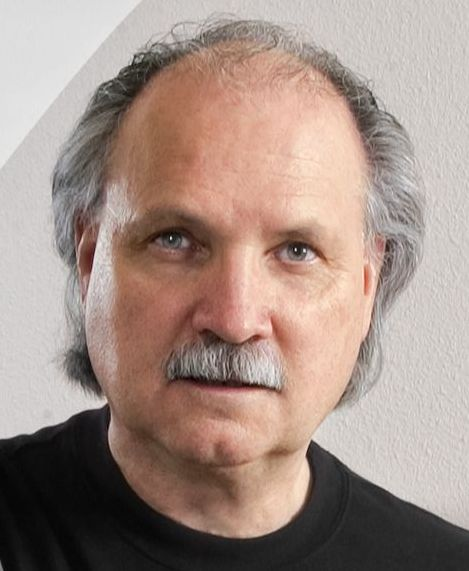
- Born: February 24, 1940 (age 86); Inglewood, California, United States
- Occupation: Architect

Arthur Dyson (born February 24, 1940) is an American architect.

== Early life and apprenticeships ==
Arthur Dyson was born in Inglewood, California, on February 24, 1940, the son of Harry and Thyra Dyson. While still in high school, he had a paid position in the architectural firm of Bartoli and Skinner from 1957 to 1958. On June 21, 1958, the Los Angeles Herald Examiner published a photograph of Dyson reporting his acceptance as an apprentice of Frank Lloyd Wright in the Taliesin Fellowship. Although Dyson would have less than a year in the Taliesin studio before Wright died, a comment during that time from Wright led Dyson to a subsequent internship with Bruce Goff, someone Life magazine reported to be “one of the few US architects whom Frank Lloyd Wright considers creative.” Reflecting on his brief but profound experience with Wright, Dyson said, "My own apprenticeship was with the truth of organic architecture so profoundly matured in the Master of Frank Lloyd Wright"

From 1959 to 1961, Dyson lived and worked at the Goff office in the Frank Lloyd Wright-designed Price Tower in Bartlesville, Oklahoma. Goff presented Dyson with a catalog from an exhibition of the work of Purcell and Elmslie, an important American organic architecture firm active from 1907 to 1921 Returning to his native state, Dyson discovered William Gray Purcell was living in Pasadena, California. Purcell hired Dyson as his personal assistant and draftsman from 1962 to 1963. The two men spent much of their time together reviewing the architectural records of Purcell and Elmslie, and discussing progressive design principles. Like that of Frank Lloyd Wright, the office of Purcell and Elmslie descended directly from the seminal architectural firm of Louis Sullivan. In this way, Dyson carries a unique continuity from the Sullivan office through mentorship from Wright and Purcell.

== Career ==
=== 1960s-1970s ===
Opening an independent practice first in Los Gatos, California and then for a time in Monterey, California, Dyson moved eventually to Fresno, California in 1969. There he established the office of Arthur Dyson and Associates that remains his base of operations. Even before leaving the Goff office, Dyson conceived some of his earliest projects on a large scale and using innovative technologies. The Carlson Apartment Building project (1959) proposed a 17-story, 36-unit concrete and glass tower designed to overlook the Pacific Ocean at Santa Monica, California. The Cannery Row Hotel project (1966) for a site in Monterey, California further developed the grammar of a multi-story residential tower. The subsequent 27-story Chamlian Plaza Hotel project (1979) in Fresno, California, featured a sophisticated system of suspended structural engineering, prefabricated construction, and a skin of automated solar tempering for guest rooms that virtually eliminated the possibility of being trapped by fire. The Westrend Visitors Center complex project (1972) for a tourist area adjacent to a main highway in the San Joaquin Valley suggested innovative use of textiles in a massive circular canopy supported by a spar tower, a creative structural technique that decades later would be adopted by prominent architects.

Residential work provided the most opportunities for construction. Like many organic architects Dyson could encounter difficulties in realizing individually expressive forms when confronted by the demands of conservative building codes, contractors used to bidding on more familiar building forms, and other obstacles. For example, plans for the Lynn Studio and Residence (1965) at a site in Carmel, California, pleased the client greatly but remained unbuilt due to resistance toward financing such a unique design. However, a number of built houses won attention in local press and international architectural publications, as well as accumulated design awards. One of the most important of these was the Geringer residence (1979) in Kerman, California. Set amid the long straight lines of a commercial vineyard, Dyson turned the house in on itself as a circular form centered on a swimming pool to establish a relaxing vista shared by the main living areas. The Geringer house was later published as an exemplar of former Taliesin apprentices who were expressing the organic design philosophy in fresh, creative works. Dyson also received recognition for the United Packing Company Building [later Fullerton, Lang, Reichert & Patch offices] (1979), a commercial office building in Fresno, California.

From the very start of his professional practice as an architect Dyson sought to demonstrate architecture as a force for community good, particularly in an unpublicized commitment to bring professional architectural services to the causes of the culturally disadvantaged. Notable unbuilt projects during this period include the Monterey Institute for the Arts project (1966) in Pacific Grove, California, and the American Indian Center project (1975) in Fresno, California, a museum facility done pro bono to showcase objects relating to the history of the Mono and Yokuts people of central California. In 1971, Dyson developed two schemes for a publicly subsidized children's center constructed in Orange Cove, California that combined both a Head Start and day care operation. By serving at the same time as chairman of the Urban Planning Task Force in Fresno, Dyson commenced a lifelong journey in public service. He also began to lecture at colleges, universities, and museums as outreach for progressive design principles.

=== 1980s ===
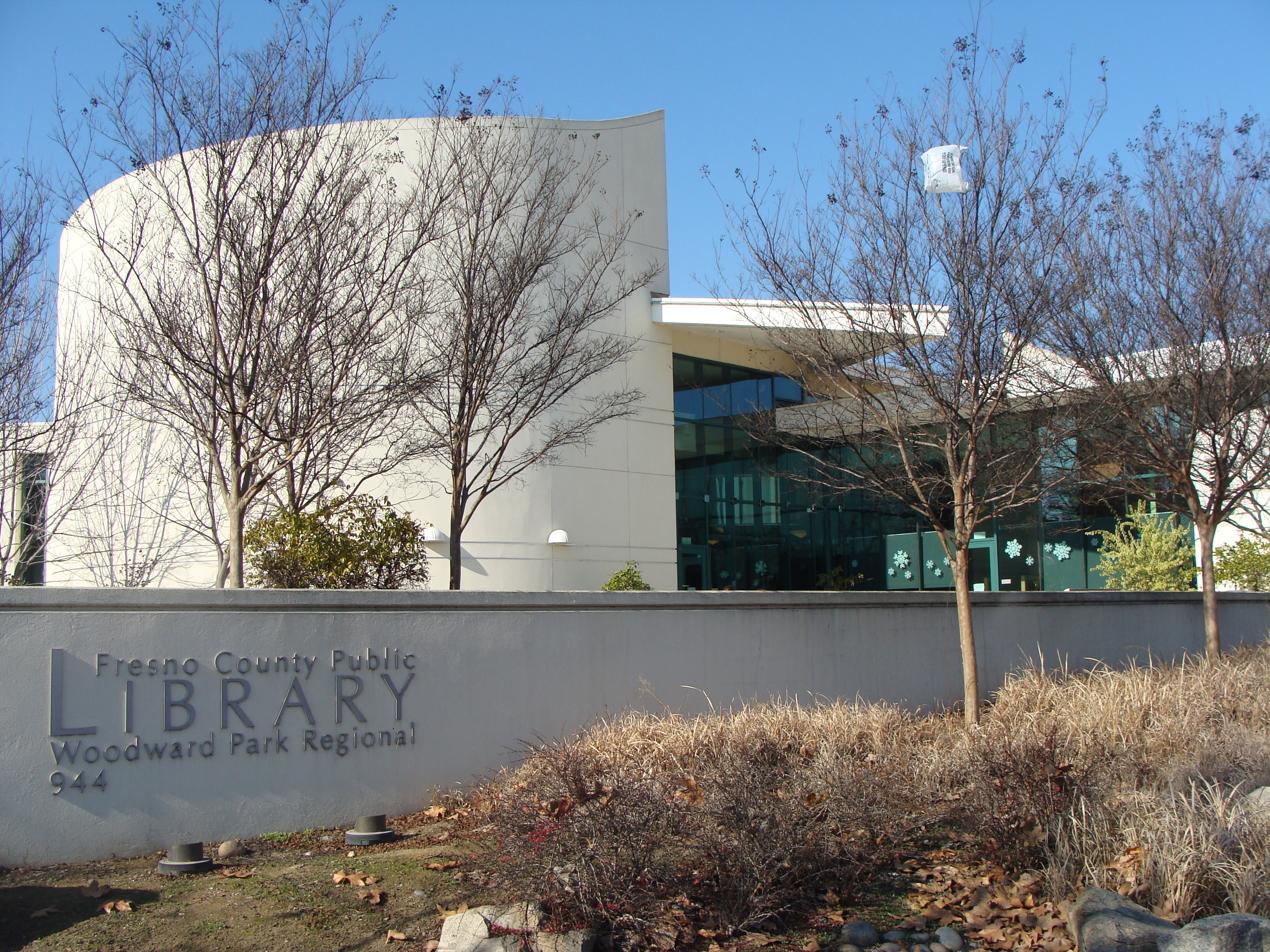
Woodward Park Library, designed by Dyson, was completed in 2001

Although commissions were executed for other kinds of structures, residential design dominated the output of the Dyson office during the 1980s. The Bedwell residence (1982) in Fresno, California, represents the first in a series of larger homes (5,800 square feet in this instance) produced during this decade whose massing occurs through the dynamic intersection of angular forms. Similar broad polygonal forms established the elevations of the Wohlgemuth house (1984) and the Simpson residence (1985), both in Fresno, California. Positioned on a low rise above stretches of commercial vineyards, the Jaksha residence (1988) in Madera County, California, featured a highly articulated expression of angular design in the floor plan, surrounding decking, and sun-tending trellises. Professional acclaim for the Jaksha design accumulated quickly and the house was published extensively, including twice in Sunset magazine.

Dyson also produced buildings with arced forms. The Lencioni house (1985) in Sanger, California, produced a particularly unique two story oval form that was also widely recognized. Appearing in popular magazines, professional journals, architectural yearbooks, and most recently in a college textbook, the composition was cited by important critics such as Bruno Zevi as a superior expression of organic architectural principles. In the award-winning Barrett-Tuxford residence (1987) in Richland Center, Wisconsin, curvilinear massing was refined through the development of two successive schemes. Unfolding in shape from a natural resonance with the slope of the hillside, the curvature of the earth-enclosed foundation wall embraced an interior space divided into living, working, and sleeping areas. A terrace extruded by the use of earth from the construction excavation extended the living space into an arboreal setting of trees rooted down grade of the building. This house was also lauded by Bruno Zevi in the same article where he extolled the Lencioni house design. Two unbuilt house designs by Dyson used similar oval pod forms. The plan for the Carlson residence (1981) in Van Nuys, California, occupied an exceptionally steep building site with an integrated system of cantilevered pods. The Millerton house project (1984) in Madera County, California, for a similarly difficult site grouped the pods with a connecting bridge over a rocky cleft and also responded to an environmentally exposed position by incorporating a Teflon roof covering supported by a steel frame for thermal regulation. Dyson further developed a curvilinear form for the Glynns Restaurant (1984) in Fresno, California, that incorporated round light tower elements which would evolve and feature significantly in later projects.

Public awareness of Dyson increased. The first international display of his drawings took place at the London museum of the Royal Institute of British Architects (RIBA) in 1985, where his projects were included in an exhibit titled The American School of Architecture: The Bruce Goff Legacy. Dyson was again featured in a subsequent installation at the RIBA called 10 California Architects, at which time the RIBA acquired for their permanent collection a Dyson rendering of the Vuelos de Cobre (or Walson) residence (1990) then under construction in San Diego County, California. In addition to the multiple publications by Bruno Zevi about Dyson for the European audience, the Japanese architectural periodical A+U: Architecture and Urbanism twice featured a compendium of Dyson projects illustrated in color. These publications coincided with an increased demand for Dyson as a speaker at universities, arts organizations, and professional societies, where he continued to express his commitment to the mutual ends of progressive design and public well-being.

=== 1990s ===
Residential commissions continued to be an important activity for the Dyson office in the 1990s, but this decade saw a significant growth in substantial institutional and commercial projects. Dyson recognized the need for a collaborative office structure to support the production of drawings, approvals process, and construction administration for more complex projects like churches, schools, libraries, and similar community shared facilities. Joining with other architects who possessed special expertise in such building programs to establish a separate partnership practice eventually called DSJ Architects, Dyson became sole designing architect for the new firm. Under the arrangement, Dyson maintained a steady output of design from his personal practice, as well.

The establishment of the DSJ Architects partnership led to immediate work in building houses of religious worship. Although Dyson's personal office received professional awards for a remodeling of the Seventh-Day Adventist Church (1991) in Porterville, California, that integrated functional improvements with new decorative enrichment, his participation in DSJ Architects resulted designs for new facilities for four Christian churches and a Buddhist temple. Two schemes were prepared for the United Japanese Christian Church (1991/1992) in Clovis, California, which reveal a reconception of the form between the two versions unusual in Dyson work. The realized building exhibits several features that continue to develop in subsequent projects, notably the sweeping simplicity of sparingly embellished space in a light filled sanctuary and an entrance embracing from high overhead the approach of worshipers with elongated steel trellis forms. In St. Mary's Catholic Church (1994) in Sanger, California, the extension of twelve wings in the entrance trellis work refers to the Christian apostles and forms a symbolic canopy over a monumental sixteen foot high statue of the Virgin Mary. The Huber Memorial Chapel for the First Congregational Church (1997) in Bakersfield, California, refines the entrance adornment into a single vector of joined steel spars jutting forward from the cornice in a visual reference to hands joined in prayer.

Toward the end of the 1990s, Dyson produced the first in a series of school designs that would develop as a major activity of the DSJ Architects partnership. The Temperance-Kutner Elementary School Library (1999) in Clovis, California, introduced a curvilinear form within a narrow site on the campus of an existing school characterized by standard rectangular classroom wings. The Webster Elementary School (1999), in Fresno, California, anchored classrooms and administrative office segments with circular towers whose flowing lines foster a sense of embrace and belonging. Interior colors, textures, and lighting features both relax and stimulate mental activity. In another example of steel trellis forms used as symbolic markers, a white canopy of tubes suspended from dual masts indicates the main entrance. Between 1999 and 2005, both the Temperance-Kutner Library and the Webster School were honored for design excellence by multiple chapters of the Society of American Registered Architects.

In his personal practice, Dyson continued to develop a grammar of curvilinear and angular forms. Notable arc based forms included the Casey residence (1996) whose one-story lines reflect the crest of a rise overlooking the Pacific Ocean in La Selva Beach, California, and the compact combination of a live-work building in the Hall residence project (1993) for a commercial street corner near the ocean in Cayucos, California, in which vertical curves counterpoint horizontal angular elements in the massing. Three houses are examples of continuity with the grammar of angular composition. The small, economically stringent Peretti residence (1991) in rural Clayton, California, used a deck extension with open cable balustrade outside to increase the sense of interior space. Perched on a ridge overlooking the Straight River, the larger Rietz residence (1991) in Owatonna, Minnesota, reflected a strong client affinity for straight geometric lines. The Woods residence (1996) in Coarsegold, California, used angular prows of copper sheathed wood reach to reach upward, joining views in the rooms to the horizon through windows, clerestories and skylights.

Broader public recognition of Dyson's work increased. The first scholarly exhibition devoted solely to his designs was installed at the Fresno Art Museum in 1994. A similar installation occurred that same year at the gallery of the Graham Foundation for Advanced Studies in the Fine Arts in Chicago, Illinois, an event which coincided with the release of the first monograph discussing Dyson and his work. Bruno Zevi continued to present Dyson projects to his European readership, and A+U: Architecture and Urbanism in Japan once again featured a section on Dyson. Reviews of his work also appeared in Czech and Turkish periodicals.

=== 2000s ===
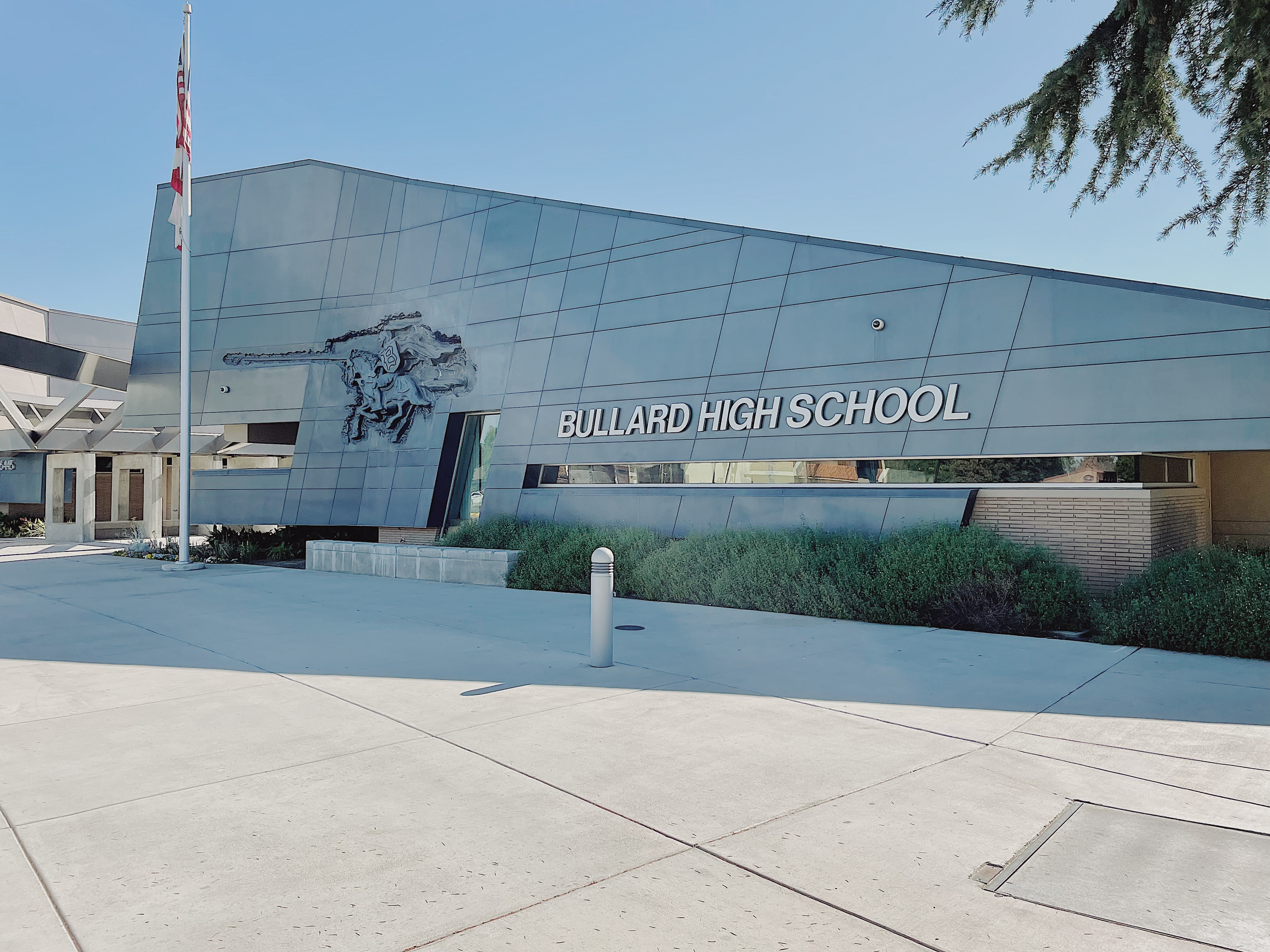
Decorative facade of Bullard High School. Renovation in 2022 led by Dyson's firm.

With the turn of the 21st century, Dyson entered an era of expanded opportunities for larger commissions and broadened scope in type of building. This decade was marked by the establishment of new client relationships that produced multiple projects, return of previous clients with additional work, and an increasing number of designs for larger commissions through the DSJ Architects partnership. Dyson also continued his public service activities and outreach efforts to educate both professionals and the general public about the important humanistic values of organic design. As part of this endeavor, he returned to the Taliesin community as Dean of the Frank Lloyd Wright School of Architecture from 1999 to 2002.

The most spatially expressive and largest house yet completed by Dyson was the Hilton residence (1999/2000) in Paradise by the Sea, Florida. The relationship of the structure to the environment through large glass walls and openings emphasizes the natural rhythmic enjoyment of coastal life, especially sea breezes and beach sunsets. Primary living spaces are suspended as pods within the interior, an arrangement that maximizes ocean sight lines opened through large expanses of glass walls that are tinted to mitigate solar glare. The same client also commissioned the Del Coronado Condominiums project (2000), a 24-story, 127 unit beachfront tower in which residents would have completely unobstructed views of the Gulf of Mexico throughout their living space.

Greater opportunities also came to Dyson for work with public and private institutions. Environmental responsiveness and technological sophistication as primary architectural features characterize a series of designs for museums and cultural centers. Having earlier conceived the energy efficient envelope of an earth sheltered museum facility for the Discovery Center project (1999) in Fresno, California, the plans made by Dyson for the science oriented Aquarius Aquarium project (2000), also in Fresno, California, included geothermal heat exchanges for climate control and solar panels to produce hot water. Public transportation projects included several facilities for a high speed train terminal and monorail stations in Fresno. The DSJ Architects office had continued success in commissions for civic facilities, particularly libraries and schools. The curvilinear form of the Woodward Park Regional Library (2001) in Fresno, California, resulted in the National Award for Excellence for Outstanding Design from the Society of American Registered Architects in 2005 and the design was cited by critics as one of the ten best buildings of the decade in the city, and was cited as one of the ten best buildings of the decade in Fresno. One of the most significant DSJ Architects projects in this period was the University High School, a building located on the campus of California State University, Fresno. The school complex consisted of three interlocked wings containing administrative offices, classroom, and music performance space designed to house the complex requirements of an accelerated college preparatory program for a 9th to 12th grade Liberal Arts education. This building has continued to receive awards from both architectural and educational organizations.

=== 2010s ===
In the 2010s, Dyson refined his vocabulary for residential design with the Bishop residence (2012) in St. George, Utah. As the earlier Hilton residence in Florida had taken curvilinear form from the environmental cues of the Gulf of Mexico shore, the Bishop house was inspired by the sloping crest lines of mountains on the horizon and the undulating topography of the building site. Dyson furthered his public service activity with a project designed to assist economically disadvantaged people. The Eco-Village or Eco Pod shelters (2013) were conceived as an optimistic solution to address the struggles of the homeless. Dyson proposed a grouping small, inexpensive personal habitation pods set within a safe, secure, and self-sustaining living environment. Built of recycled and sustainable materials, the individual housing units were centered on a commons containing gardens for growing food, personal hygiene facilities, and an educational space for teaching crafts for self-reliance. One of the most dramatic yet economically constrained forms to come from Dyson through the DSJ Architects practice emerged in the Selma Arts Center (2012/2013) in Selma, California. An infill construction in place of a collapsed store within an existing commercial block, this commission for a theatrical performance space produced a dynamic, extroverted facade that attracted attention to the arts activities. Other significant civic projects for DSJ Architects included a design for a new Fresno County Central Library (2007) and a renovation of the Huron Library (2012) in Huron, California.

In 2012, Dyson undertook an unusual project for his office in the restoration of the Randall Fawcett House designed by Frank Lloyd Wright in 1955 and built in Los Banos, California. Completed in 2013, the project repaired a significant roof defect and returned the dwelling to the original appearance. Some intrusive elements that accumulated over time were removed and features planned by Wright not realized in the original construction were introduced. The restoration project gained praise from many quarters, and received awards for excellence from multiple chapters of the American Institute of Architects in 2013–2014.

== Design philosophy ==
The most succinct statement made by Arthur Dyson of the overarching principles that motivate his designs was in an essay he contributed to a book by David Pearson titled The Breaking Wave (2001). Dyson is a lifelong proponent of what has been termed organic architecture. This philosophy originated in the life work of architect Louis Henri Sullivan and passed down from his office to inform the work of many other architects. In acknowledging this lineage, Dyson expressed his sense of commitment:

“The philosophy that drives my work is rooted in principles that take the metaphor of the organic world. This architectural approach was first articulated in American by Louis Sullivan. As a young man I apprenticed at various times with later adherents of his organic thesis, including Frank Lloyd Wright, Bruce Goff, and William Gray Purcell. All of these masters used their long careers to emphasize the importance of honesty in architectural expression. They saw this as a spiritual, but not dogmatic, quest that was inherent in every single building.”

In this essay Dyson defined the key elements of the design process he undertakes. First, there is an examination of the life experiences and aspirations of the client. This assessment examines the motivations, both conscious and unconscious, that brought the client to call for a building. Secondly, there is an intersection of inner discernment with an outer, specific physical location. The given conditions of a building site are predetermined by unavoidable features, such as climate and topography. In the view of Dyson, the resulting form should express individuality of presence that shows this set of conditions. Thirdly, the design must also integrate the availability of economic resources, accessibility of building materials, and responsiveness to legal regulations. The outcome of the design process identifies human life with a given setting, creating a sense of place. In this created place we adopt an identity of belonging that in turn marks our place in the surrounding world. Dyson noted:

“In the rush of the modern world we are ironically often left feeling isolated, yet at the same time weary of demands. This conflict is fundamentally a spiritual one, something that in the mode of organic design has potential architectural solutions. Each of us has a unique and vital contribution to make to the larger human community. In turn, the body politic can only become healthier and stronger for all that participate.”

In this last statement Dyson reflects a belief that his vocation as an architect is bound inextricably with social activism for a better world.

== Dyson Seigrist Janzen Architects [DSJ Architects] ==
Dyson participates in a separate architectural practice, established in 1991 and now referred to as DSJ Architects, to partner with other architects for collaboration on the production and administrative aspects of larger institutional and commercial commissions, as well custom residential, affordable multi-family housing, governmental, military, medical, retail, financial institutions, and offices. Projects produced by DSJ Architects have included numerous award-winning churches, schools, and libraries. The firm presently consists of three principals: Arthur Dyson, who serves as sole designing architect; Robert Seigrist, who oversees contracts, day-to-day operations, and quality control; and Douglas Janzen, AIA, who has special expertise in educational facilities.

== Selected works ==
Commissions noted as projects were not built. Designs for which there are earlier, different versions are labeled as schemes. The projects shown here have each been either published or recognized for their achievement in some public forum.

=== Residential ===
Commissions listed here include single family residences, multi-family dwellings such as condominiums and apartments, and social services housing.

- Alexander residence, project, Madera, California (1980)
- Andrade residence, scheme #1, Fresno, California (1982)
- Andrade residence, scheme #2, Fresno, California (1985)
- Andrade residence, Fresno, California (1988)
- Andrade cabin, project, Fresno County, California (1985)
- Ascherl residence, Almaden Valley, California (1968)
- Asire residence, project, Fresno County, California (1987)
- Barrett-Tuxford residence, scheme #1, Richland Center, Wisconsin (1985)
- Barrett-Tuxford residence, Richland Center, Wisconsin (1987)
- Baughman residence, Springville, California (1982/1991)
- Bedwell residence, Fresno, California (1982)
- Bedwell residence, project, Kauaʻi, Hawaii (1989)
- Bishop residence, St. George, Utah (2012)
- Carlson Apartment Building, project (1959)
- Carlson residence, project, Van Nuys, California (1981)
- Casey residence, La Selva Beach, California (1996)
- Del Coronado Condominiums, project, Panama City Beach, Florida (2000)
- Eco Pod, Fresno, California (2013)
- Evans residence, Fresno, California (1973)
- Garrison residence, Fresno, California (1979)
- Geringer residence, Kerman, California (1979)
- Hall residence, project, Cayucos, California (1993)
- Hilton residence, Panama City Beach, Florida (1999)
- Hilton guest house, Panama City Beach, Florida (2002)
- Jaksha residence #1, Madera County, California (1988)
- Johnson Residence, Fresno, California (1980)
- Kelly residence, Portola Valley, California (2001)
- Lencioni residence, Sanger, California (1986)
- Leverich residence, Portola Valley, California (1972)
- Lynn studio and residence, project, Carmel-by-the-Sea, California (1965)
- McNeely residence, project, Fresno, California (1986)
- Michael residence, project, Berkeley, California (1977)
- Millerton residence, project, Madera County, California (1984)
- Peretti residence, Clayton, California (1991)
- Rietz residence, Owatonna, Minnesota (1991)
- Rhineshart residence, project, Maui, Hawaii (1982)
- Runyon residence, Fresno, California (1992)
- Sahatjian residence, Fresno, California (1981)
- Salt Aire Dunes condominiums, project, Grayland, Washington (2006)
- Simpson residence, Fresno, California (1986)
- Uhden residence, project, Santa Cruz, California (1989)
- Vuelos de Cobre residence, San Diego County, California (1990)
- Warner residence, Fresno, California (2004)
- Wohlgemuth residence, Fresno, California (1984)
- Woods residence, Coarsegold, California (1996)
- Woods-Morris residence, Nevada City, California (2002)
- Zhongkai Shensan Villa Group, project, Shanghai, China (2006)
- Zumwalt residence, Madera, California (2008)

=== Commercial ===
- Cannery Row Hotel, project Monterey, California (1967)
- Effie Office Building, project, Fresno, California (1975)
- Fresno Arts and Sciences Academy, project [as DSJ Architects] Fresno, California (2006)
- Glynns Restaurant, project, Fresno, California (1984)
- Grand Central Station, project, Fresno, California (2003)
- Interior Systems, remodel, Fresno, California (1995)
- Manchester Sky Train Transfer Station, project, Fresno, California (2005)
- Najarian-Simonian Office Building, Fresno, California (1973)
- Riverview Terrace Office Complex [as DSJ Architects] Fresno, California (2006)
- RMC Office Building, project, Fresno, California (1996)
- Scarborough, Tozlian, Laval Office Building, project, Fresno, California (1980)
- SunSpree Convention Center, Panama City, Florida (1996)
- United Packing Company Building (later Fullerton, Lang, Reichert & Patch offices), Fresno, California (1979)
- United States Post Office, Springville, California (1983)
- Westrend Visitor Center, Recreation Building, and Restaurant, project, Kern County, California (1972)

=== Institutional ===
Commissions listed here include churches, schools, libraries, health care facilities, and cultural centers.

- American Indian Center, project, Fresno, California (1975)
- Aquarius Aquarium, project, Fresno, California (2000)
- Betsuin Buddhist Temple, project [as DSJ Architects] Fresno, California (1999)
- Betsuin Buddhist Temple Family Center [as DSJ Architects] Fresno, California (2009)
- California Conservation Corps Museum, project, Auburn, California (2008)
- Center for Disability Innovation, California State University, Fresno, project, Fresno, California (2008)
- Chamlian Plaza Hotel, project, Fresno, California(1979)
- Clovis Botanical Garden, Visitor's Center, Clovis, California(2025)
- Discovery Center, project, Fresno, California (1999)
- First Christian Church, scheme #1, project, Inglewood, California (1971)
- First Christian Church, scheme #2, project, Inglewood, California (1979)
- Foxworthy Hotel, project, Fresno, California (1998)
- Fresno Arts and Sciences Academy, project as DSJ Architects, Fresno, California (2006)
- Gettysburg Elementary School, interiors [as DSJ Architects] Clovis, California (2012–13)
- Grand Central Station, project, Fresno, California (2003)
- Horizon Christian Church, project, Modesto, California (1995)
- Huber Memorial Chapel, First Congregational Church [as DSJ Architects] Bakersfield, California (1997)
- Huron Library Renovation, interior design [as DSJ Architects] Huron, California (2012)
- Immanuel Schools Auditorium, project, Fresno, California (2001)
- Lanare Community Center, project, Riverdale, California (1969)
- Lifestyles Community Center, San Joaquin, California (2005)
- Locust Avenue Church of Christ, remodel, Manteca, California (1986)
- Monterey Institute for the Arts, project, Pacific Grove, California (1966)
- New Dimensions Woman's Health Clinic, project, Fresno, California (2003)
- Orange Cove Children's Center, scheme #1, Orange Cove, California (1971)
- Orange Cove Children's Center, Orange Cove, California (1974)
- Quail Lake Elementary School [as DSJ Architects] Clovis, California (2001)
- Riverview Terrace Office Complex [as DSJ Architects] Fresno, California (2006)
- RMC Office Building, project, Fresno, California (1996)
- San Joaquin Veterans of Foreign Wars Hall, project, San Joaquin, California (2007)
- Selma Performing Arts Center [as DSJ Architects] Selma, California (2012–13)
- Seventh-Day Adventist Church, remodel, Porterville, California (1991)
- Shingon Temple remodeling, Fresno, California (2007-2014)
- St. Mary's Catholic Church [as DSJ Architects] Sanger, California (1994)
- Stone Soup Cultural Center, scheme #1, project, Fresno, California (2009)
- Stone Soup Cultural Center, scheme #2, project, Fresno, California (2009)
- Temperance-Kutner Elementary School Library [as DSJ Architects] Fresno, California (1999)
- University High School, Fresno, California (2002)
- United Japanese Christian Church, scheme #1 [as DSJ Architects] Clovis, California (1991)
- United Japanese Christian Church [as DSJ Architects] Clovis, California (1992)
- University High School [as DSJ Architects] Fresno, California (2008/2010)
- Webster Elementary School [as DSJ Architects] Fresno, California (1999)
- Woodward Park Regional Library [as DSJ Architects] Fresno, California (2001)

== Writings and publications ==
Arthur Dyson has contributed to architectural literature in several ways, often to bring awareness to the work of the architects with whom he apprenticed. In 1992, he provided a preamble to the Guide to Frank Lloyd Wright’s California, a book by architectural photographer Scot Zimmerman who has also documented many buildings by Dyson. Dyson once more introduced Wright in Frank Lloyd Wright: The Western Work, with text by Dixie Legler and photography by Scot Zimmerman, in 1999. Dyson wrote a foreword for a book on Bruce Goff created by Goff friend and colleague architect Phil Welch titled Goff on Goff: Conversations and Lectures, and in 1998 presented an introduction to Drawings for an Alternative Architecture: the Folios of John Henry Wythe, an organic architect who had worked in the Goff office. While serving as president of the San Joaquin chapter of the American Institute of Architects in during 1991–1992, Dyson published a series of articles directed to his peers. Each of these short pieces examined different ways of taking a broader view in professional attitude by designing within the larger context of community well-being. In 2001, Dyson presented a direct statement of his design values and principles that was published in a book on organic architects, alongside illustrations of the Jaksha, Lencioni, Barrett-Tuxford, and Hilton houses.

== Selected exhibitions ==
The work of Arthur Dyson has been exhibited at more than 60 venues, including museums, universities, colleges, academies and schools of architecture, professional associations, national conventions, galleries, and arts centers since the early 1980s.

- The American School of Architecture: The Bruce Goff Legacy, Royal Institute of British Architects Museum (May 2 – June 8, 1985)
- The Architecture of Arthur Dyson, Fresno Art Museum (1993).
- Poetics of Space: The Architecture of Arthur Dyson, Fresno Art Museum, (June 17-August 15, 2004)
- Arthur Dyson, Architect: The Soul of Architecture (L'Architettura meditativa) Villa Palagione, Centro Interculturale, Volterra, Italy (October 5–30, 2009)

== Honors and awards ==
Between 1989 and 2014, Arthur Dyson received professional recognition for his architectural designs from more than 23 awarding institutes, councils, competitions, civic programs, and publications. In 1993, Dyson was awarded the Gold Medal of the Society of American Registered Architects (SARA), a national American architectural organization that also has various regional chapters. In addition to the gold medal, the Dyson practice received the Distinguished Presidential Citation (1994) and the Presidential Citation for Dedication and Contribution to the Professional of Architecture (1992). SARA has given the National Honor Awards for Design Excellence or the National Honor Award for Outstanding Design to 18 projects from the Dyson and DSJ Architects offices. In addition, the individual chapters of SARA have presented other recognitions, including State Firm Award (1998, 2004) from the California Council, together with 31 further honors for individual projects; the Outstanding Firm Award (2002) and Medal of Honor for Lifetime Achievement in Architecture (2000) from the New York Council, along with 18 individual project honors; and 6 additional project awards from the Pennsylvania and Illinois Councils of SARA (1994-2008).

As a longstanding member of his regional San Joaquin Chapter of the American Institute of Architects (AIA), Dyson was most recently presented by this group with the Lifetime Achievement Award (2014). His work had previously been recognized with the Presidential Award (2006), Architectural Firm of the Millennium (1999), and Presidential Citation for Lifetime Contribution to the Profession (1999). Between 1993 and 2012, Dyson's practice and DSJ Architects partnership received 30 honors from the San Joaquin Chapter for design excellence in individual projects. Other AIA chapters have also offered similar awards.

In 2003, Dyson was presented with an International Honorary Diploma as Professor of Architecture at the International Academy of Architecture, Sofia, Bulgaria.
