= William Cunningham Gray =

American newspaper publisher, editor, and columnist (1830–1901)

William Cunningham Gray (October 17, 1830 – 1901) was a newspaper publisher, editor, and columnist in the United States. He published and edited the Presbyterian Church publication The Interior. He wrote a column for it titled "Campfire Musings" featuring his recollections of rural Wisconsin. He also wrote about Booker T. Washington and Tuskegee Institute in Alabama and was an advocate for civil rights. He also wrote about Alaska.

He was born on the family farm in Butler County, Ohio. He studied at Farmers' College and became a lawyer. He lived in Chicago. University of Wooster conferred him with an honorary degree. Under his guidance The Interior became very influential.

Charles C. Miller designed his home. Lawton S. Parker painted a portrait of him in 1892.

He married and had a daughter, Anna Catherine Gray Purcell. William Gray Purcell was his grandson.

He wrote a book about Keweenaw where he owned land.

== Publishings ==
- Life of Abraham Lincoln. For the young man and the Sabbath school (1867)
- Keweenaw: An early story of the Copper Country (1884)
- Camp-fire musings, life and good times in the woods (1894)
- Musings by camp-fire and wayside (1902) illustrated with his photographs
