= Mae St. John Bramhall =

American poet

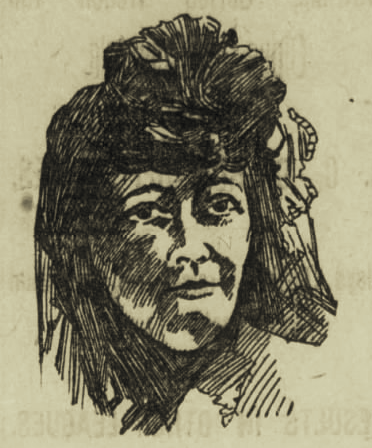
- Mae St. John Bramhall
- Born: Mae Laws c. 1861; Richmond, Indiana, U.S.
- Died: February 1897; Fordham, Bronx, New York, U.S.
- Education: St. Mary's School, Reddington, Ohio, U.S.
- Occupations: actress, writer
- Spouse: Anson Dudley Bramhall (m. 1889)
- Relatives: Cornelia Laws St. John (mother)
- Writing career
- Genre: poetry
- Notable works: Japanese Jingles; The Wee Ones of Japan

Mae St. John Bramhall (née, Laws; after adoption, St. John; after marriage, St. John Bramhall; c. 1861 – February 1897) was a 19th-century American actress and versatile writer who contributed to many magazines and newspapers. Her mother is Cornelia Laws St. John, a poet and songwriter.

== Early life and education ==
Born Mae Laws, she was the second daughter of Joseph and Cornelia (Williams) Laws. Mae was born c. 1861, in Richmond, Indiana, (Note: Some newspapers record Bramhall's place of birth as New York state.) and resided there until almost of adult age, when the family removed to Chicago, Illinois.

She received her education in the public schools of Richmond and Chicago, with a short period at St. Mary's School at Reddington, Ohio.

Before starting her theater career, she was regarded as the most beautiful woman in Chicago society.

== Career ==
Bramhall was performing in comic opera in the 1880s.

In 1889, (Note: Other sources record the year of marriage as 1892.) she married Anson Dudley Bramhall, of New York City, and the following two years were spent in Japan. There, she wrote and published her first book, Japanese Jingles, which she dedicated to her uncle and aunt, Dr. and Mrs. James F. Hibberd. Charles Scribner & Sons had the exclusive sale of these books in America, which sale they deemed phenomenal. She also wrote letters for several prominent American newspapers during her stay in Japan. When financial reverses came, her husband failed in business, and separation followed.

While a resident of El Paso, Texas, Bramhall visited the World's Columbian Exposition in Chicago in 1893. By 1894, she was a resident of New York City and was writing sketches of baby life in Japan for Harper's Bazaar . She expanded them into a volume which the Harpers brought out with illustrations by Charles Dater Weldon (1844–1935). Entitled, The Wee Ones of Japan, it described the Japanese child from babyhood to their school days, including their dress, their ways, their play and study, and the customs which surround them. She also published Around the World at Leisure Letters.

== Death and legacy ==
For the last two years of her life, Bramhall was a recluse and her friends and former admirers heard but little of her. She suffered before her death, which occurred February 5 or 7, 1897, (Note: According to the Indianapolis Journal (1897), Bramhall died February 5, 1897. According to Fox (1912) Bramhall died February 7, 1897.) age 36, at the Home for Incurables, Fordham, Bronx, New York. A number of unpublished manuscripts were the only legacy she left to her adopted son, Dudley Bramhall, of Chappaqua, New York.

== "The Japanese Good Morning" ==
A fall to the knees,
A turn to the toes,
A spread of the hands,
And a dip of the nose.
It takes all these just to say "Good-day"
In Chrysanthemum-land so far away.

—"The Japanese Good Morning", by Mae St. John Bramhall, in the January 1897, St. Nicholas Magazine.

== Selected works ==
- Japanese Jingles (Tokyo: T. Hasegawa, 1891)
- The Wee Ones of Japan (New York: Harper & Brothers, 1894)
- Around the World at Leisure Letters
