= Ohio Female College =

College in Cincinnati, 1852-1873

Coordinates: 39°11′33″N 84°32′38″W

The Ohio Female College was founded in 1850 in College Hill, Cincinnati by Reverend John Covert and operated until 1873.

The site was used to build the Cincinnati Sanitarium, the first private US psychiatric facility not on the East Coast. The sanitarium was renamed Emerson A. North Hospital in 1956. When the hospital closed in 1994, the site was used by Phoenix International, a company that conducted clinical trials of drugs for the pharmaceutical industry. After Phoenix left in 2000, Cincinnati Children's Hospital College Hill Campus was established on the site.

== Notable alumni ==
- Cornelia Laws St. John (died 1902), poet
