= College Hill Town Hall =

- U.S. National Register of Historic Places
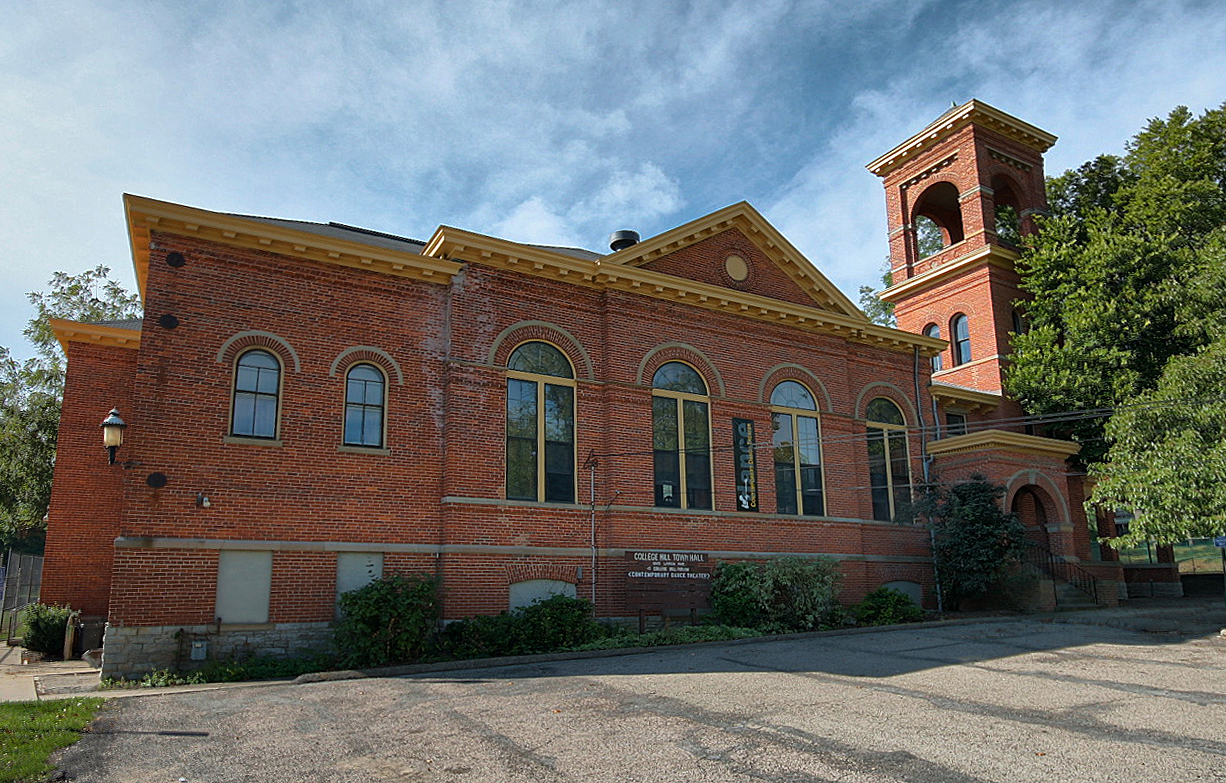
- Northern side

- Location within Ohio Location within the United States
- Location: Belmont Ave. and Larch St., Cincinnati, Ohio
- Coordinates: 39°11′37″N 84°32′59″W
- Area: 2.5 acres (1.0 ha)
- Built: 1886
- Architect: Samuel Hannaford
- Architectural style: Greek Revival, Renaissance Revival
- MPS: Samuel Hannaford and Sons TR in Hamilton County
- NRHP reference No.: 78002075
- Added to NRHP: March 17, 1978

The College Hill Town Hall is a historic village hall in the city of Cincinnati, Ohio, United States. Built as village offices for College Hill when it was a separate community, the building was designed by Samuel Hannaford, and it has been named a historic site.

Founded in 1813, College Hill incorporated in 1866. For its first twenty years, the village owned no public buildings; the present structure, built in 1886 and dedicated in January 1887, was the only such building ever owned by the village before its annexation into the city of Cincinnati. Such buildings were common in communities of the period, but as the only public building in College Hill, it is starkly different from the surrounding built environment. The architect was Samuel Hannaford, who had become famous a decade earlier as the designer of the grand Cincinnati Music Hall near downtown. In 1886, Hannaford was ending a period of sole proprietorship; just one year after the College Hill Town Hall was built, he began a partnership with two of his sons.

Built of brick on a stone foundation, the town hall is covered with an asphalt roof and features additional elements of brick and stone. A wide staircase permits entry through a large archway in the facade, which sits next to a four-story tower, within which a Belfry is placed. The building has an irregular plan, due partly to multiple locations at which elements of brick project from the walls. Rather than being of a single style, the town hall is an eclectic structure, mixing elements of the Greek Revival and Renaissance Revival styles. For example, various parts of the roof are disparate: some are hipped, while others rise to gables. A brick frieze with corbelling is placed near the top of the walls, while the cornice itself is formed of crafted metal. Indoors, the building is divided into rooms for numerous functions. In addition to the meeting room for the village council, the building has space for a community room with stage and for apartments in which the village's jailer could live.

In 1978, the College Hill Town Hall was listed on the National Register of Historic Places, qualifying both because of its place in the area's history and because of its historically significant architecture. It is one of dozens of Hannaford-designed buildings in Cincinnati and the suburbs to be listed on the National Register. Among the organizations using the building is a dance company, the Contemporary Dance Theater.
