= College Hill, Cincinnati =

Coordinates: 39°12′N 84°33′W

College Hill
- Neighborhood of Cincinnati
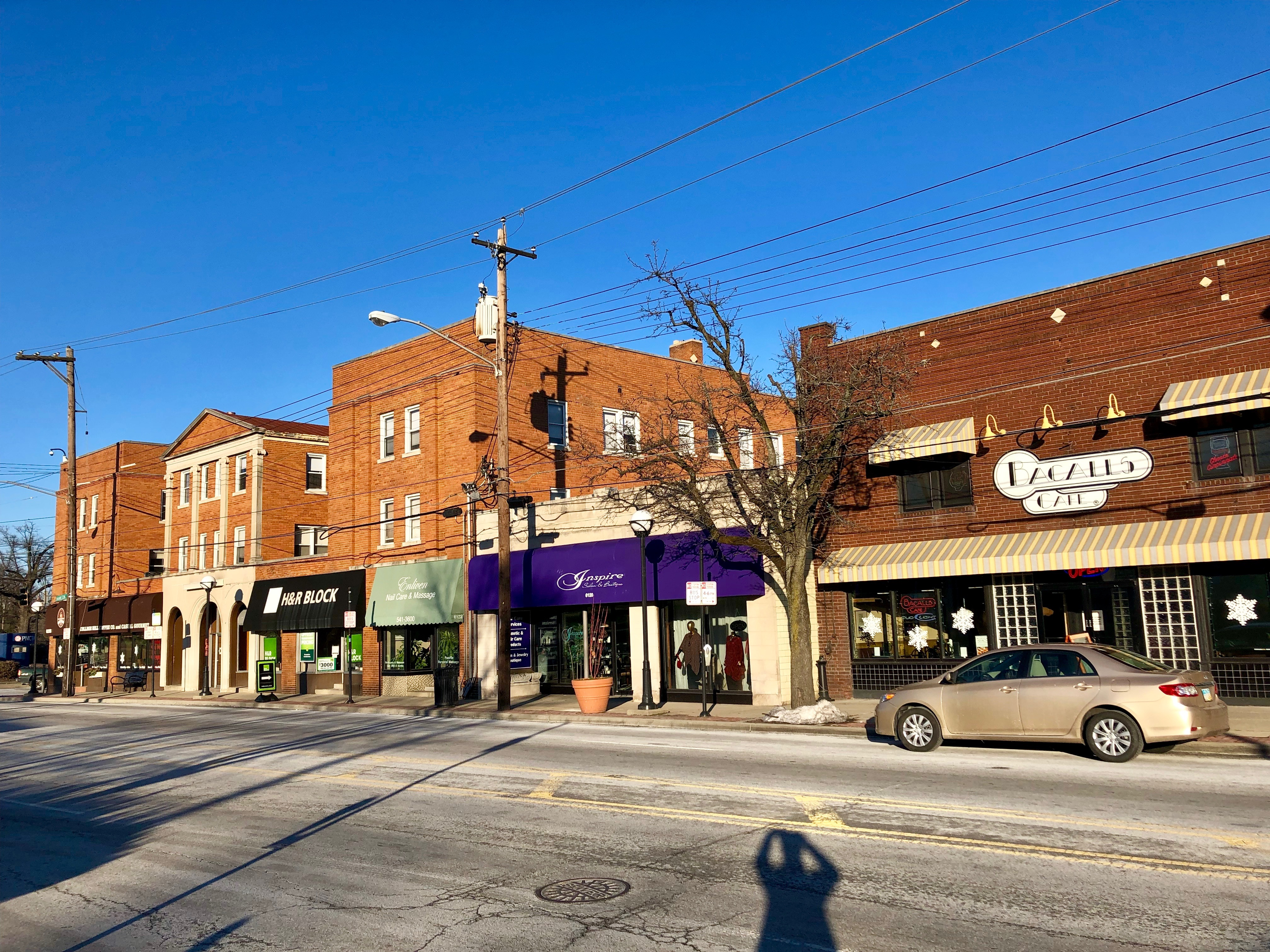
- Hamilton Avenue in College Hill, Cincinnati

- Flag

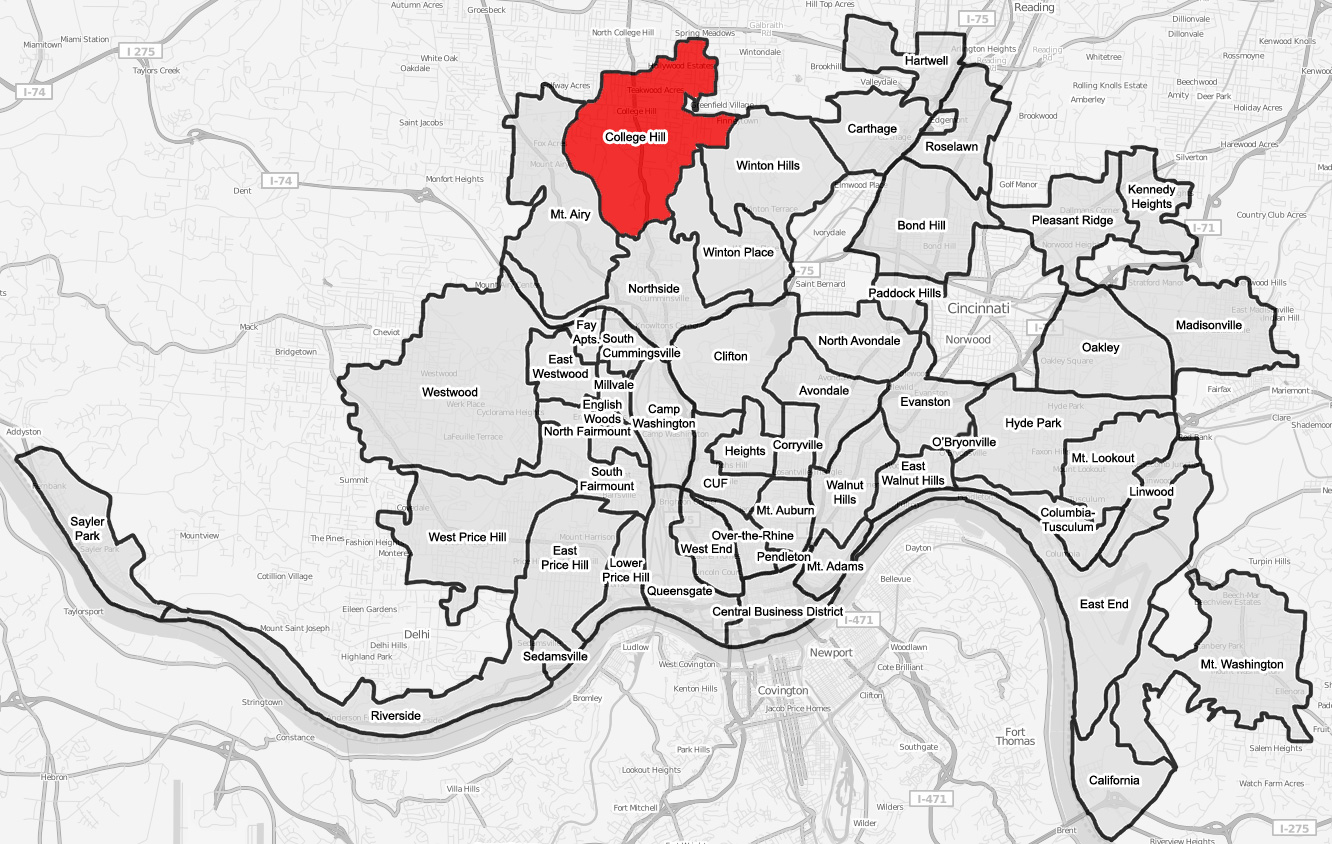
- College Hill (red) within Cincinnati, Ohio
- Country: United States
- State: Ohio
- County: Hamilton
- City: Cincinnati

Population (2020)
  - Total: 16,039

College Hill is one of the 52 neighborhoods of Cincinnati, Ohio. Established in 1813 and annexed in 1911, 1915, and 1923, it is located in the northwestern part of the city. It was originally called Pleasant Hill due to its prime location, but was later renamed College Hill because of the two colleges that were established there in the mid-nineteenth century. The neighborhood is not to be confused with North College Hill, which borders College Hill to the north but is not part of Cincinnati. The population was 16,039 at the 2020 census.

== History ==
In 1813–14, William Cary, having migrated from New Hampshire to Cincinnati in 1802, purchased 491 acres (1.99 km^{2}) north of Cincinnati along what is now Hamilton Avenue (U.S. Route 127). Cary built a log cabin and moved his family to the area, then part of Mill Creek Township. In 1833, Cary's son Freeman G. Cary established Pleasant Hill Academy for boys on part of his land. The academy became an agricultural school called Farmer's College (for which the area was renamed) in 1846. That school became Belmont College in 1885, and then formed the core of the Ohio Military Institute in 1890. A separate school, the Ohio Female College, was founded in 1852 by Reverend John Covert and operated until 1873 when it was sold to build the Cincinnati Sanitarium, the first private US psychiatric facility not on the East Coast.

The development of the area was expedited by the introduction of a railroad line in 1851 and horsecar service in the 1860s. College Hill was incorporated as a village in 1866, then annexed to the city of Cincinnati in stages in 1911, 1915 and 1923.

Several buildings in the neighborhood are listed on the National Register of Historic Places, including Laurel Court, College Hill Town Hall and the Old College Hill Post Office.

== Demographics ==
Population of College Hill 1950-2020
Year	Pop.	±%
1950	10,492	—
1960	15,198	+44.9%
1965	19,632	+29.2%
1970	21,590	+10.0%
1980	17,327	−19.7%
1990	15,785	−8.9%
2000	15,269	−3.3%
2010	14,133	−7.4%
2020	16,039	+13.5%

As of the census of 2020, there were 16,039 people living in the neighborhood. There were 7,624 housing units. The racial makeup of the neighborhood was 32.6% White, 60.3% Black or African American, 0.1% Native American, 0.8% Asian, 0.0% Pacific Islander, 1.1% from some other race, and 5.1% from two or more races. 2.8% of the population were Hispanic or Latino of any race.

There were 7,263 households, out of which 54.1% were families. 42.6% of all households were made up of individuals.

22.8% of the neighborhood's population were under the age of 18, 59.2% were 18 to 64, and 18.0% were 65 years of age or older. 44.7% of the population were male and 55.3% were female.

According to the U.S. Census American Community Survey, for the period 2016-2020 the estimated median annual income for a household in the neighborhood was $48,284. About 12.0% of family households were living below the poverty line. About 28.3% had a bachelor's degree or higher.

== Notable people ==
- John E. Bruce, former mayor
- Samuel Fenton Cary, representative and temperance movement leader
- Lewis M. Crosley, industrialist and businessman
- Powel Crosley Jr., inventor, industrialist, and entrepreneur
- Cornelia Laws St. John, poet

== Gallery ==
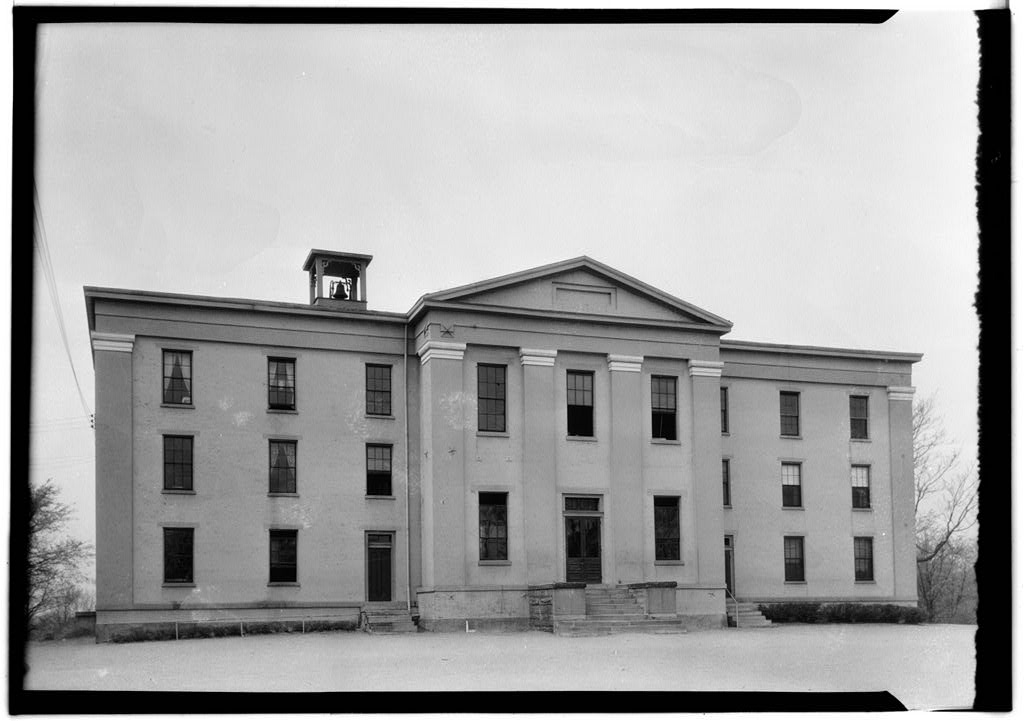
Farmer's College, built 1848 (photo 1934)

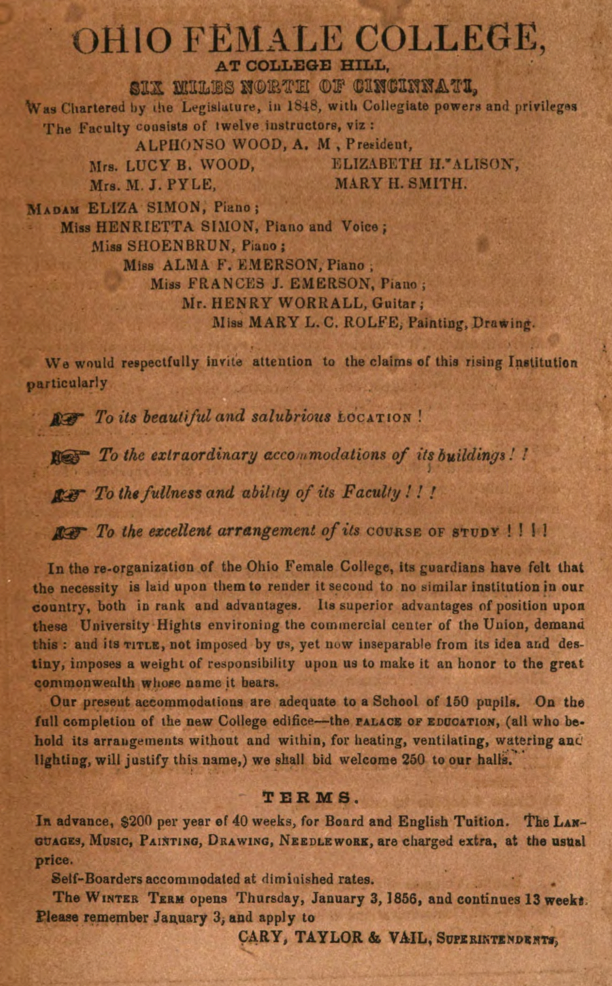
Advertisement for Ohio Female College, 1857

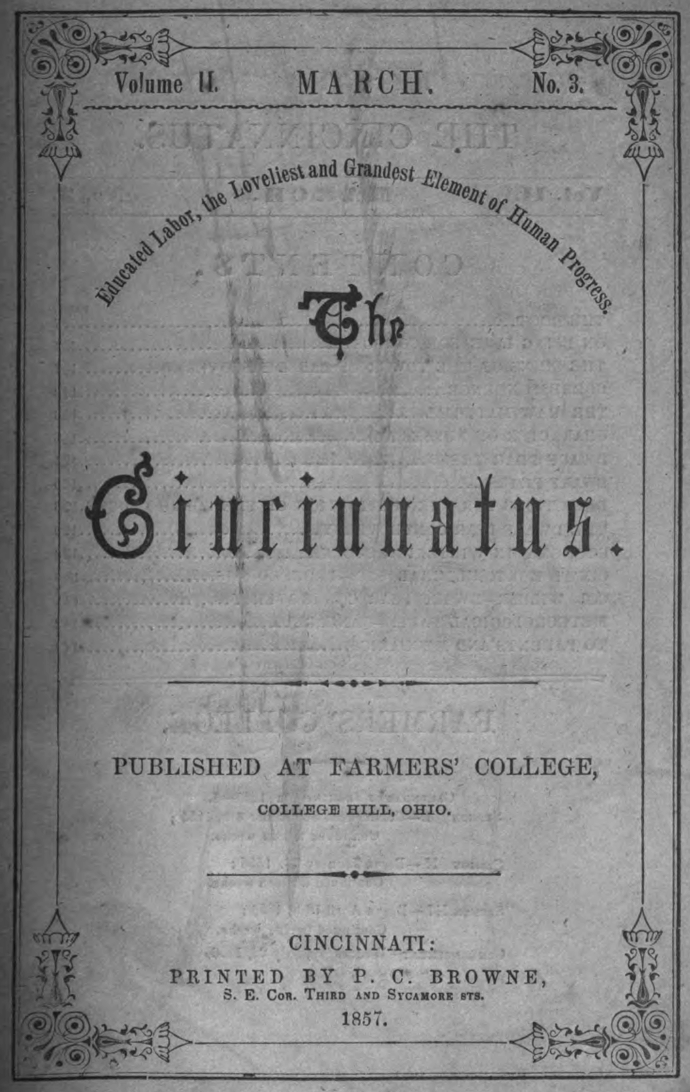
Cover of Cincinnatus, publication of Farmer's College, 1857
