= Ohio Military Institute =

- Freeman Grant Cary Pleasant Hill Academy
- U.S. National Register of Historic Places
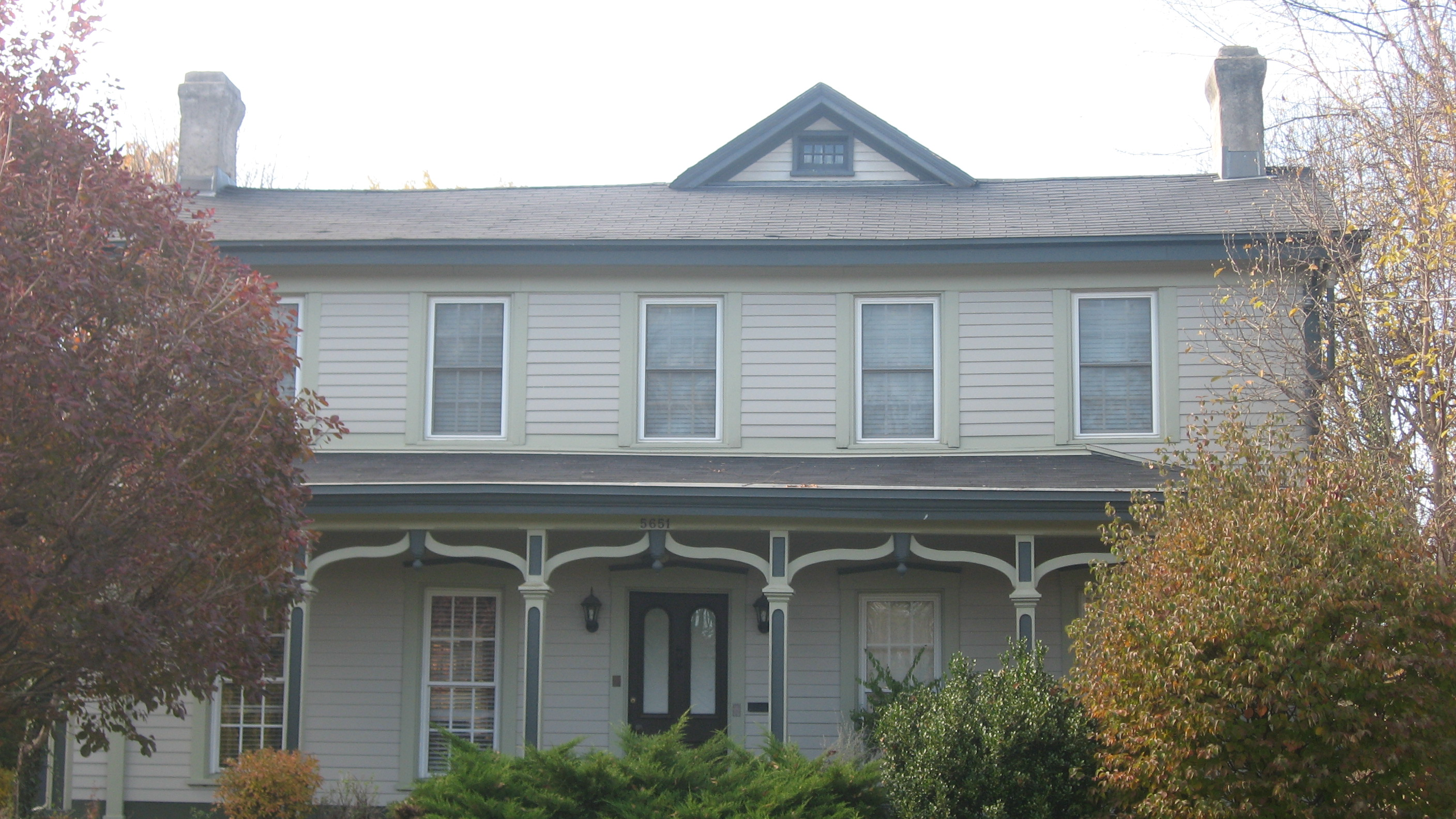
- Front of the former school

- Location within Ohio Location within the United States
- Location: 5651 Hamilton Ave., Cincinnati, Ohio
- Coordinates: 39°11′38.5″N 84°33′21″W
- Area: 0.6 acres (0.24 ha)
- Built: 1832
- Architectural style: Greek Revival and Italianate
- NRHP reference No.: 99000511
- Added to NRHP: April 29, 1999

The Ohio Military Institute was a higher education institution located in Cincinnati, Ohio. Founded in 1890, it closed in 1958.

== History ==
The Ohio Military Institute was established in 1890, on the foundation then known as Belmont College, and in the earlier days, as Farmers' College. The history of the college goes back almost to the beginnings of education in the West. Farmers' College was one of the first institutions of higher culture established beyond the mountains. It had a long and useful career. The roster contains the names of President Benjamin Harrison; Murat Halstead, the great editor; and Bishop John M. Walden, of the Methodist Episcopal Church.

Farmers' College was begun perhaps a generation too soon for permanent success. The community had not yet accepted the concept that inspired the enterprise. To quote the language of a very old letter used in early materials, "The distinctive feature of Farmers' College is the practical character of its course of instruction *** to qualify our youth for a higher position in any of the industrial pursuits." The idea expressed is today the most powerful force directing the trend of thought in education.

=== Belmont College ===
The history of Belmont College covers a period of transition, during which the older institution was returning gradually toward its source for the training of boys.

=== Cary Academy ===
The real progenitor of the Ohio Military Institute was Cary Academy, established in his own home on College Hill by Freeman Cary, in the year 1832.

The Cary family were pioneers in this part of Ohio. The father came from New England to Cincinnati as early as 1802. A few years later he purchased a large farm on the present site of College Hill. There his two sons, Freeman G., the elder, and Samuel F., grew to manhood. Their cousins, sisters Alice and Phoebe Cary, the well-known poete, lived nearby, in what is now North College Hill. Both the Cary boys were graduated from Miami University at Oxford, then in its infancy. Freeman's ambition was to become an educator, and upon his graduation, he opened an academy for boys at his home. The old house still stands, a well-known landmark of the village.

Cary's Academy, when opened, received four pupils, but before the year closed the eager young scholar was teaching more than a score of boys. Mr. Cary was encouraged to build, on a plot of ground just in front of the present location of the school, a small brick school building. Shortly afterward he constructed a handsome addition. Meanwhile, the school increased readily in numbers, until during the last year of the old Academy, more than 120 students were in attendance. In the twelve years during which Mr. Cary conducted his school, some 1,200 boys from all parts of the West and the South came under his instruction. His Academy was, at that time, the leading private school west of the Allegheny Mountains. He was assisted in the work by an efficient corps of instructors, several of whom were very able men, who afterward became eminent educators. Probably most loved because of his personality, and the most revered and respected because of his work, was Dr. Robert H. Bishop. He came from Miami University to Cary Academy during its last year, He remained to fill the chair of Philosophy and History in the faculty of Farmers' College, Shortly before his death, in 1855, he requested that his body and that of his wife might find a last resting place on the college grounds. The letter begging this simple boon is one of the most precious archives of the college.

In 1999, part of Cary's original school was listed on the National Register of Historic Places under the name "Freeman Grant Cary Pleasant Hill Academy". Embracing his house and one other building, the designation was granted both because of the buildings' architecture and because of their connection to Cary, who was deemed a significant figure in local history.

== Alumni ==
=== Farmers' College ===
- William Cunningham Gray, newspaperman and author
- Murat Halstead
- Oliver W. Nixon
- Lewis Williams Ross
